= Division of Gorton =

Australian federal electoral division

Coordinates: 37.739°S 144.759°E

Gorton Australian House of Representatives Division
- Interactive map of electorate boundaries from the 2025 federal election
- Created: 2004
- MP: Alice Jordan-Baird
- Party: Labor
- Namesake: Sir John Gorton
- Electors: 129,256 (2025)
- Area: 207 km^{2} (79.9 sq mi)
- Demographic: Outer metropolitan

The Division of Gorton is an Australian Electoral Division in the state of Victoria.

== History ==
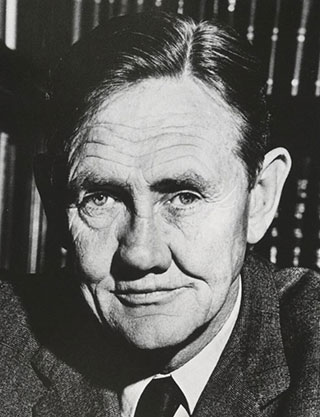
Sir John Gorton, the division's namesake

The division was created in 2004 to replace the abolished Division of Burke, and is named in honour Sir John Gorton, who served as the 19th prime Minister of Australia from 1968 to 1971. Gorton had served in the Senate from 1949 to 1968, before switching houses to represent the Victorian federal seat of Higgins until 1975.

The constituency of Gorton features a high proportion of young families and new suburban developments in the working-class outer western suburbs of the Melbourne metropolitan area.

Burke had been held by the Australian Labor Party for its entire existence, though it had become increasingly marginal since the 1980s. On its creation, it was a comfortably safe Labor seat with a majority of almost 20 percent. The last member for Burke, Brendan O'Connor, successfully transferred to Gorton in the 2004 federal election with only a small swing against him. He held it afterwards on fairly safe to safe margins until his retirement in 2025, when he was replaced by Alice Jordan-Baird, also representing Labor.

== Boundaries ==
Federal electoral division boundaries in Australia are determined at redistributions by a redistribution committee appointed by the Australian Electoral Commission. Redistributions occur for the boundaries of divisions in a particular state, and they occur every seven years, or sooner if a state's representation entitlement changes or when divisions of a state are malapportioned.

Gorton is located in the outer western suburbs of Melbourne. As of 2021, it includes the suburbs of Aintree, Bonnie Brook, Burnside, Burnside Heights, Caroline Springs, Deanside, Deer Park, Delahey, Grangefields, Fieldstone, Fraser Rise, Keilor, Keilor Downs, Kings Park, Ravenhall, Rockbank, Sydenham, Taylors Hill, Taylors Lakes, Thornhill Park, Truganina and parts of Deer Park, Derrimut, Hillside and Mount Cottrell.

It previously included the suburbs of Albanvale, Brookfield, Cairnlea, Cobblebank, Harkness, Kurunjang, Melton, Melton South, Plumpton and Strathtulloh; parts of Diggers Rest, Parwan, and Toolern Vale; as well as the townships of Exford and Eynesbury prior to past redistributions.

== Members ==
Image	Member	Party	Term	Notes
	Brendan O'Connor (1962–)	Labor	9 October 2004 – 28 March 2025	Previously held the Division of Burke. Served as minister under Rudd, Gillard, and Albanese. Retired.
	Alice Jordan-Baird (1993–)	Labor	3 May 2025 – present	Incumbent

== Election results ==
2025 Australian federal election: Gorton
Party	Candidate	Votes	%	±%
Labor	Alice Jordan-Baird	48,834	43.05	+1.74
Liberal	John Fletcher	33,087	29.17	+1.75
Greens	Thuc Bao Huynh	12,244	10.79	+1.78
One Nation	Alan Reid	7,137	6.29	−0.98
Legalise Cannabis	Xavier Menta	6,535	5.76	+5.76
Family First	Kathrine Ashton	4,216	3.72	+3.72
Libertarian	Rob McCathie	1,377	1.21	+1.21
Total formal votes		113,430	95.61	+2.73
Informal votes		5,210	4.39	−2.73
Turnout		118,640	91.81	+11.46
Two-party-preferred result
Labor	Alice Jordan-Baird	68,380	60.28	+0.30
Liberal	John Fletcher	45,050	39.72	−0.30
Labor hold		Swing	+0.30	
