= Werribee River =

River in Victoria, Australia

Werribee
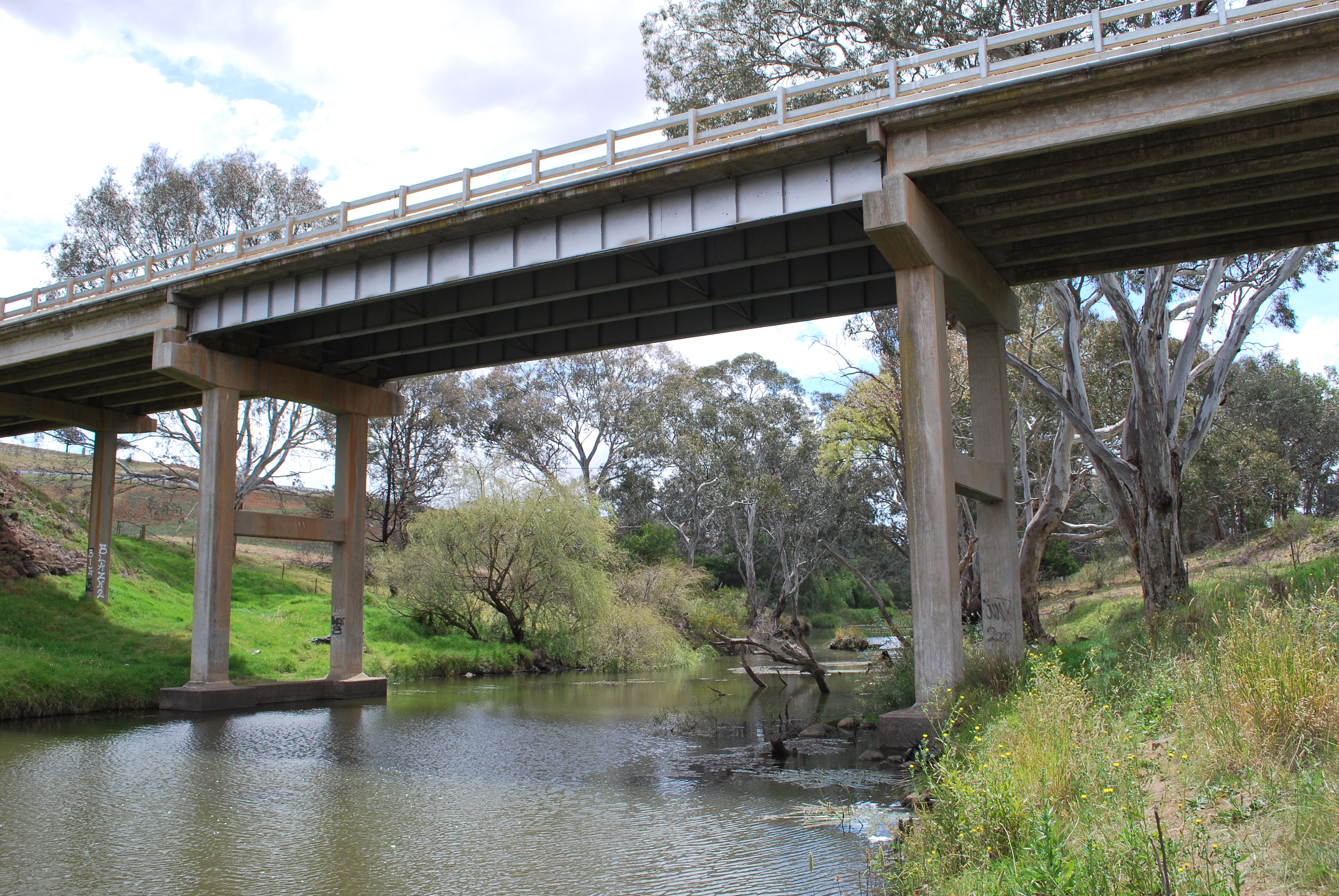
- Werribee River at Exford, downstream from Melton Reservoir

- Location of the Werribee River mouth in Victoria
- Etymology: Aboriginal (Boonwurrung/Wathawurrung): wirribi meaning "backbone".
- Native name: Wirribi-yaluk (Wathawurrung)

Location
- Country: Australia
- State: Victoria
- Region: Victorian Midlands (IBRA), Western District, Port Phillip
- Local government areas: Moorabool, Melton, Wyndham
- Cities: Ballan, Bacchus Marsh, Werribee

Physical characteristics
- Source: Great Dividing Range
  - location: Wombat State Forest near Korweinguboora
  - coordinates: 37°26′S 144°10′E
  - elevation: 501 m (1,644 ft)
- Mouth: Port Phillip
  - location: near Werribee South
  - coordinates: 37°58′42″S 144°41′40″E
  - elevation: 9 m (30 ft)
- Length: 110 km (68 mi)

Basin features
- River system: Port Phillip catchment
- Tributaries
  - left: Lerderderg River, Toolern Creek
- National park: Werribee Gorge State Park

The Werribee River is a perennial river of the Port Phillip catchment that is located on the expansive lowland plain southwest of Melbourne, Victoria, Australia. The headwaters of a tributary, the Lerderderg River, are north of Ballan near Daylesford and it flows across the basalt plain, through the suburb of Werribee to enter Port Phillip. A linear park follows the Werribee River along much of its course. In total the Werribee River completes a journey of approximately 110 kilometres (68 mi).

The river flows through the Werribee Gorge State Park before being utilised for irrigation of market gardens at Bacchus Marsh, then through Werribee where it is crossed by the Maltby By-pass. It then flows through the Werribee Open Range Zoo in Werribee Park, and finally the small coastal settlement of Werribee South before entering Port Phillip. The Western Treatment Plant, a sewage treatment site, is located near the mouth of the river, and supplies irrigation needs to the zoo.

The Werribee River Trail winds beside the Werribee River from Davis Creek in Tarneit to the Princes Highway in Werribee.

== Etymology ==
The Hume and Hovell expedition camped by the river on 15 December 1824 and named it the Arndell after Hovell's father-in-law. John Helder Wedge "re-discovered" the river in 1835 and initially called it the Peel, but then decided to call it the Ex or Exe. The name of the town of Exford, an early crossing place on the river, is derived from this name. One of the local Wathaurong-speaking Kulin tribesman that accompanied Wedge said the name for the stream was 'Weariby Yallock' (yallock meaning 'stream'). The spelling changed to the present form of Werribee, the original Aboriginal root word meaning spine or backbone.

== History ==
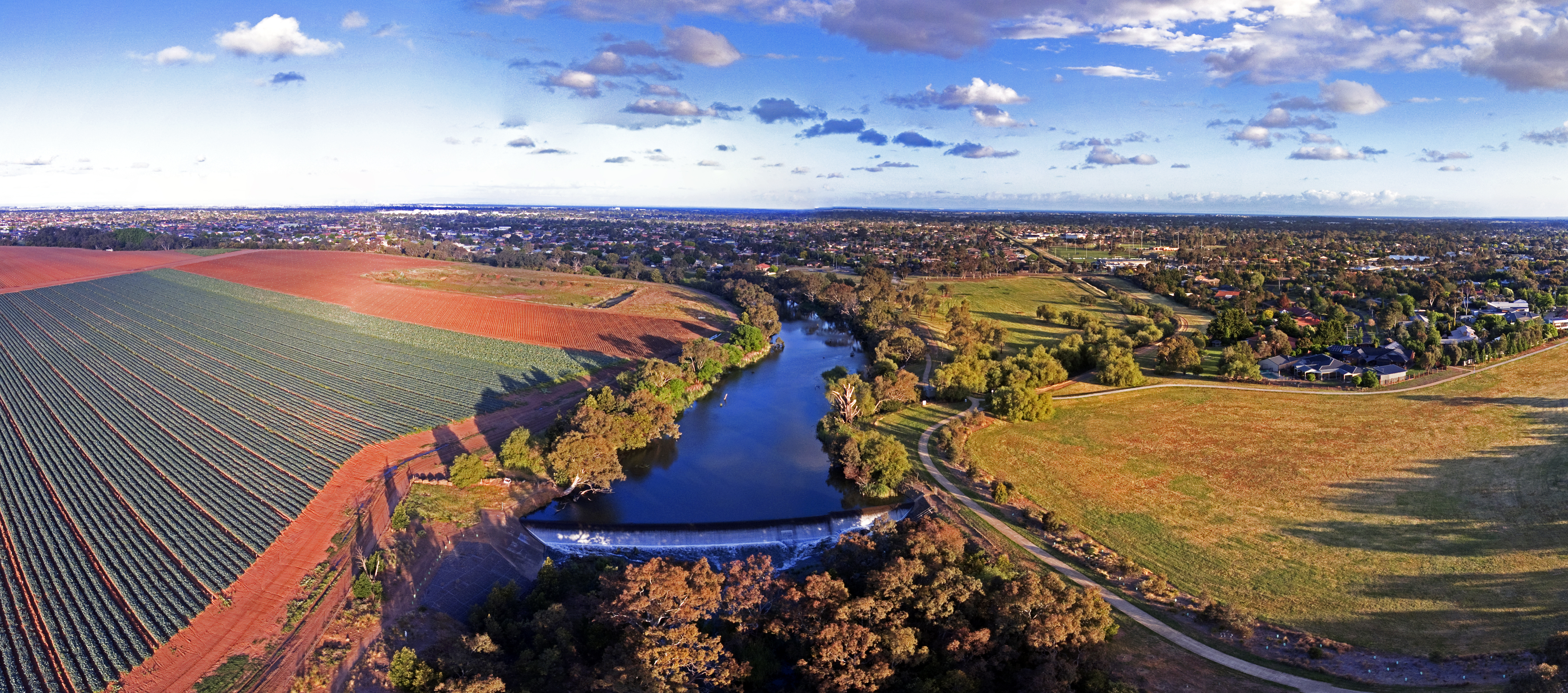
Werribee River in Spring 2017, where pasture meets suburban sprawl

Before the arrival of settlers, the Werribee River was the boundary of the Boonwurrung tribe whose six clans lived along the Victorian coast across the Mornington Peninsula, Western Port Bay to Wilsons Promontory.

In the late 1830s and 1840s, the Werribee River was the scene of conflict between the Wautharong people and the European colonisers. The squatter Charles Franks and a shepherd were speared to death near Mount Cottrell in July 1836. This resulted in the Mount Cottrell massacre – a punitive party led by John Batman which came upon a large party of Aboriginal people and indiscriminately shot and killed at least ten, There are accounts of arsenic-laced flour being given to them.

In 1851, a substantial timber bridge was built to cross the Werribee River to replace an earlier wooden bridge. In 1852, this bridge was washed away when the Werribee river flooded. A brick-arched aqueduct, built in 1894, carries the Main Outfall Sewer across the river near Werribee.

In August 2004, the Victorian Government pledged A$300,000 (equivalent to A$472,648 in 2022) towards restoring the Werribee River, removing willows choking the river around the township and replacing them with native plants in a habitat restoration project.

== Fishing ==
Werribee River holds fish all along its course, most of which are at the mouth of the river into Port Phillip Bay in the estuary. This area is best fished for southern black bream.

== Features and highlights ==
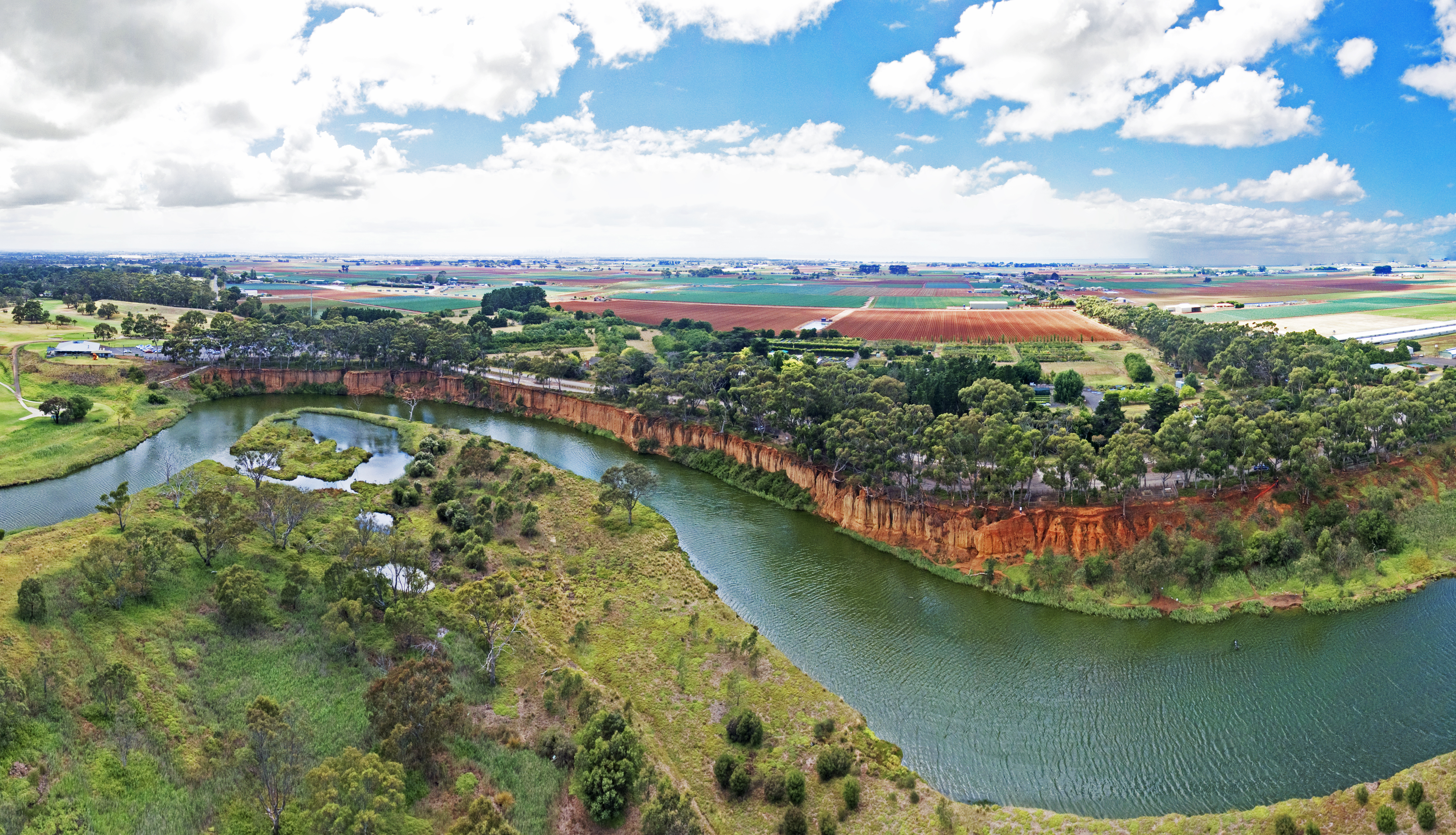
Aerial perspective of the K Road cliffs along the Werribee River in January 2018

Behind the Werribee golf course, the K-Road cliffs are perhaps the most unusual feature of the river, being sometimes described as looking like a river in Arnhem Land in the Northern Territory.

The Werribee River is a regulated river system, with two dams on the river itself (Pykes Creek Reservoir and Melton Reservoir) and one on a tributary (Merrimu Reservoir on Pyrites Creek). These supply irrigation water to horticultural and vegetable farming users in Bacchus Marsh and Werribee South.

== Gallery ==
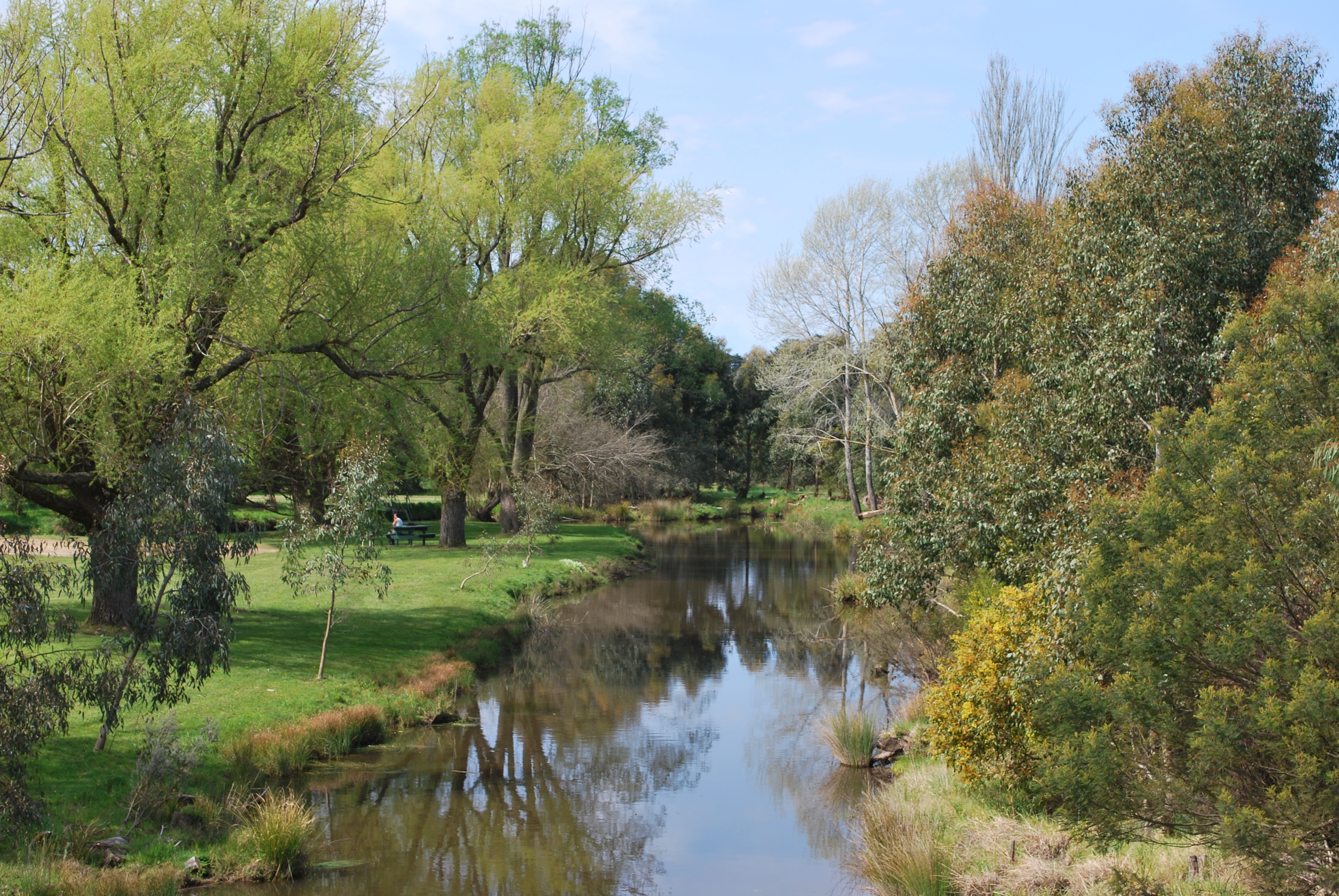
Running through parkland in Ballan

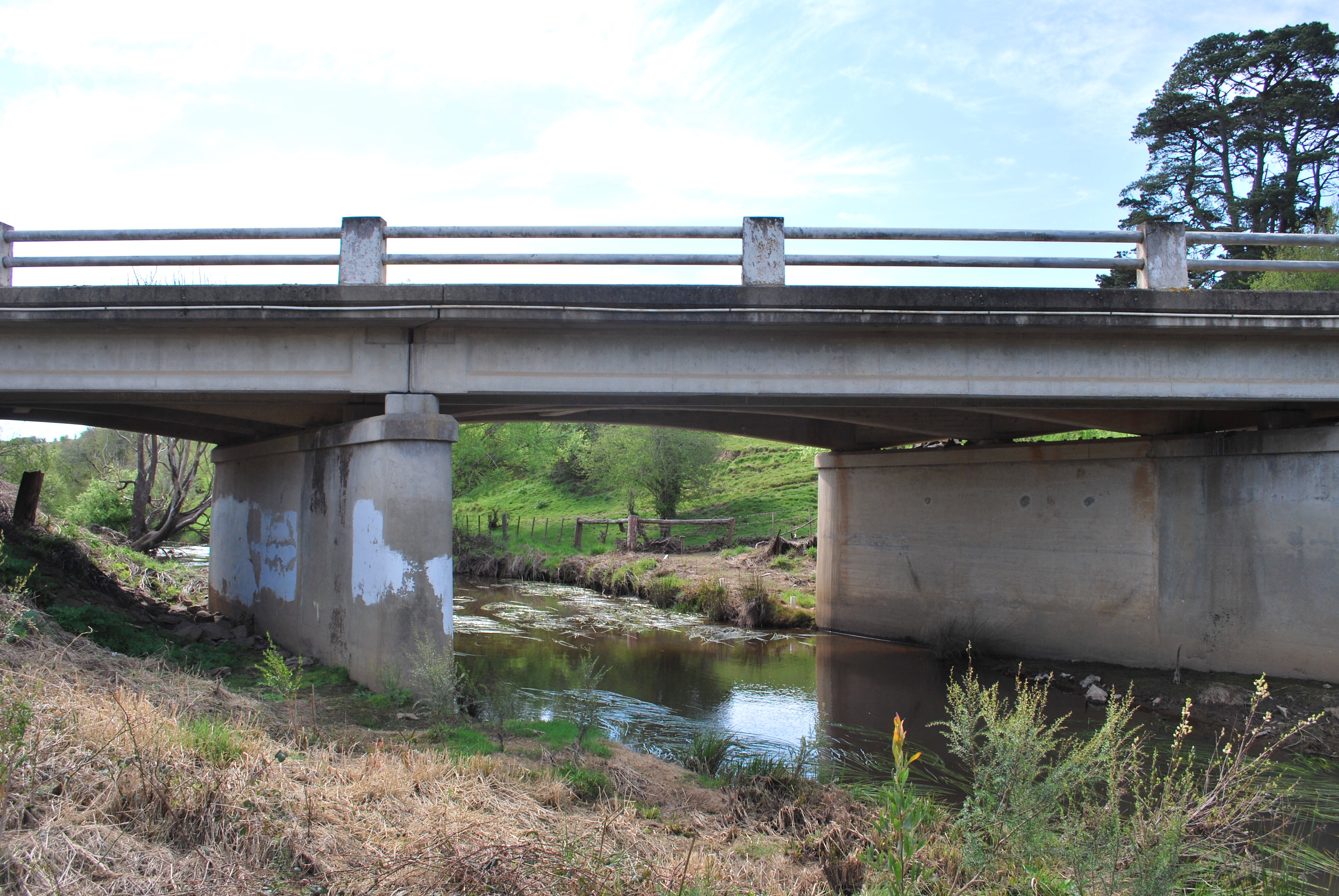
Under the old Western Highway at Ballan

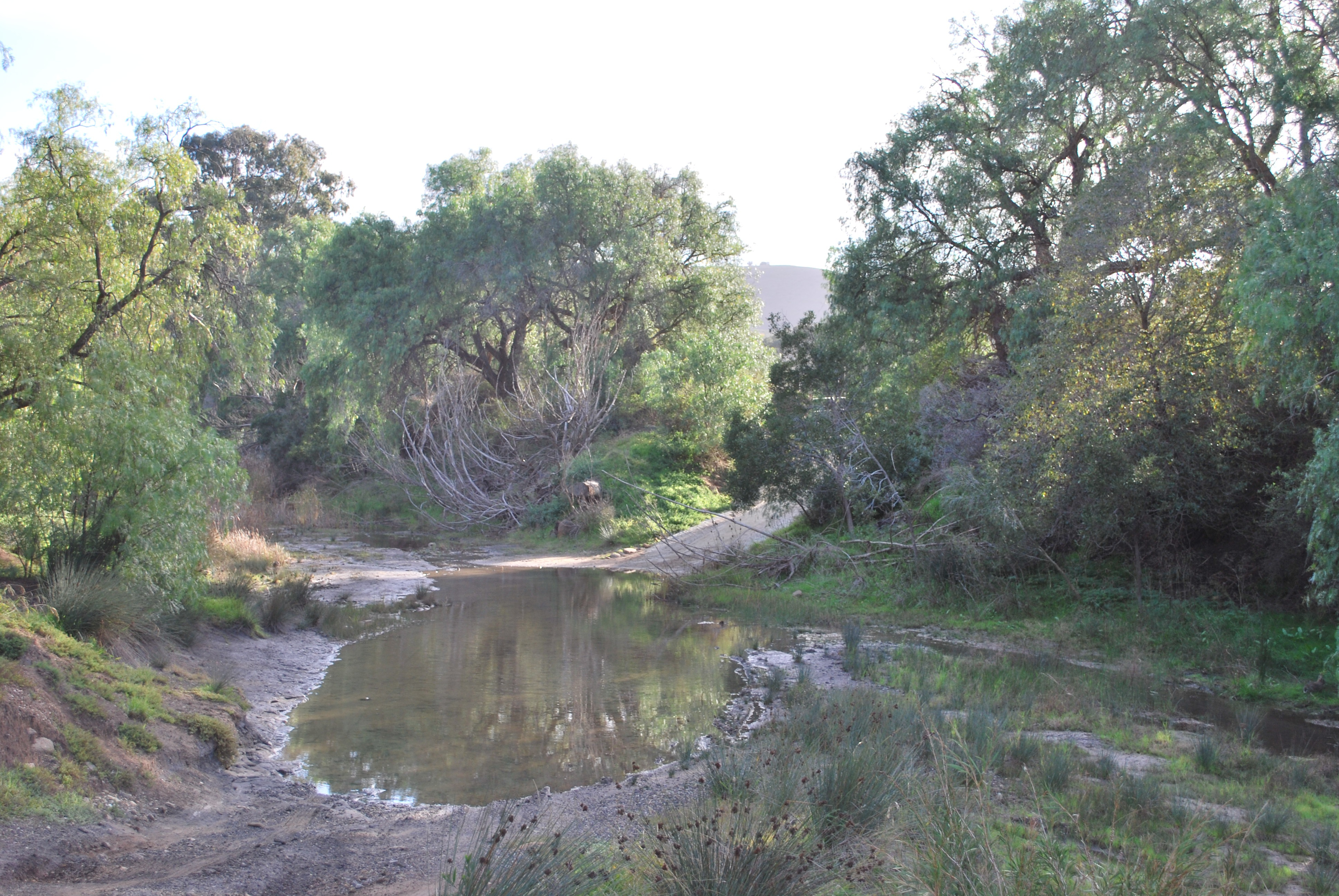
A ford across the river west of Bacchus Marsh

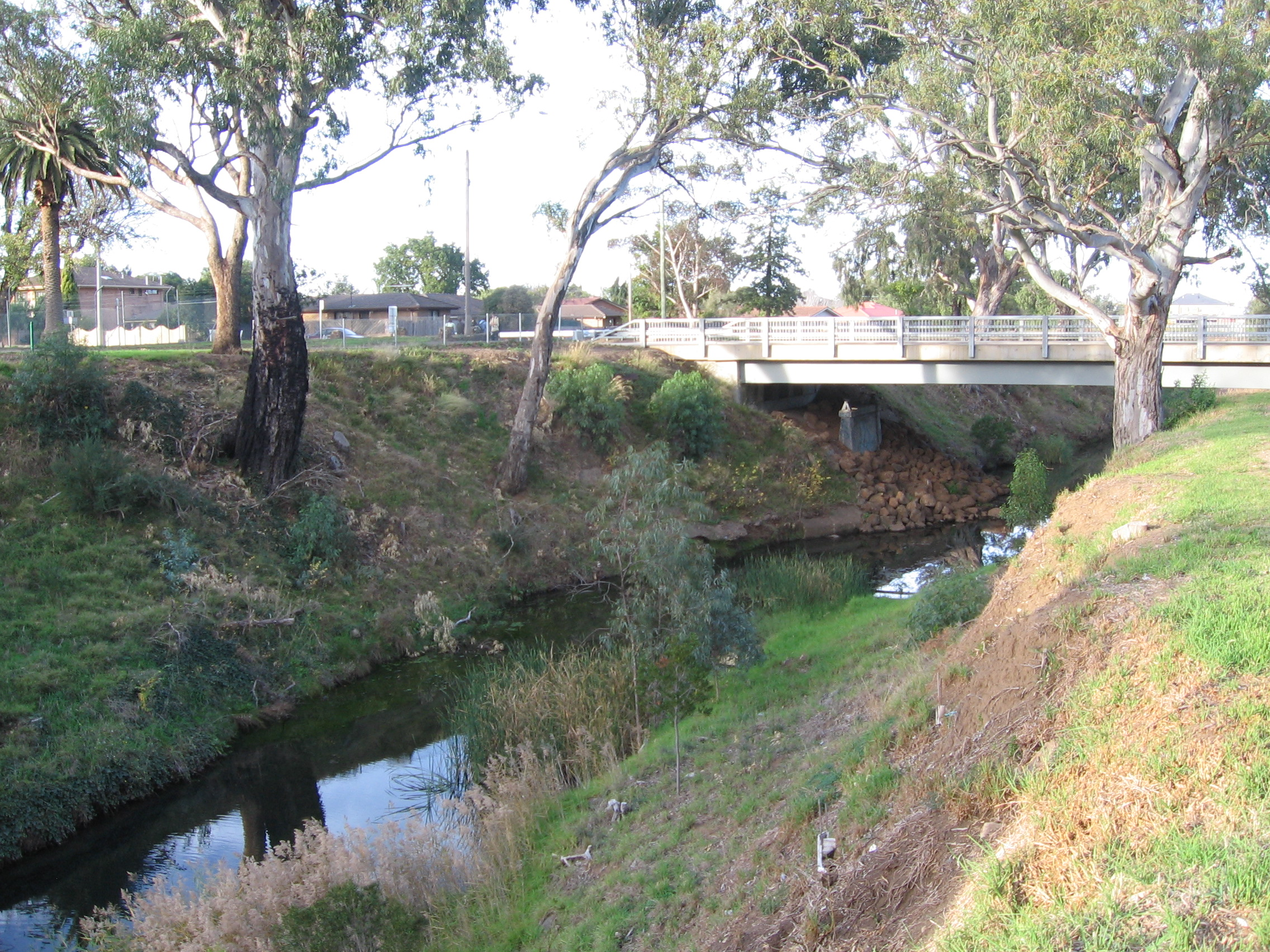
Marking the boundary between Bacchus Marsh and Maddingley

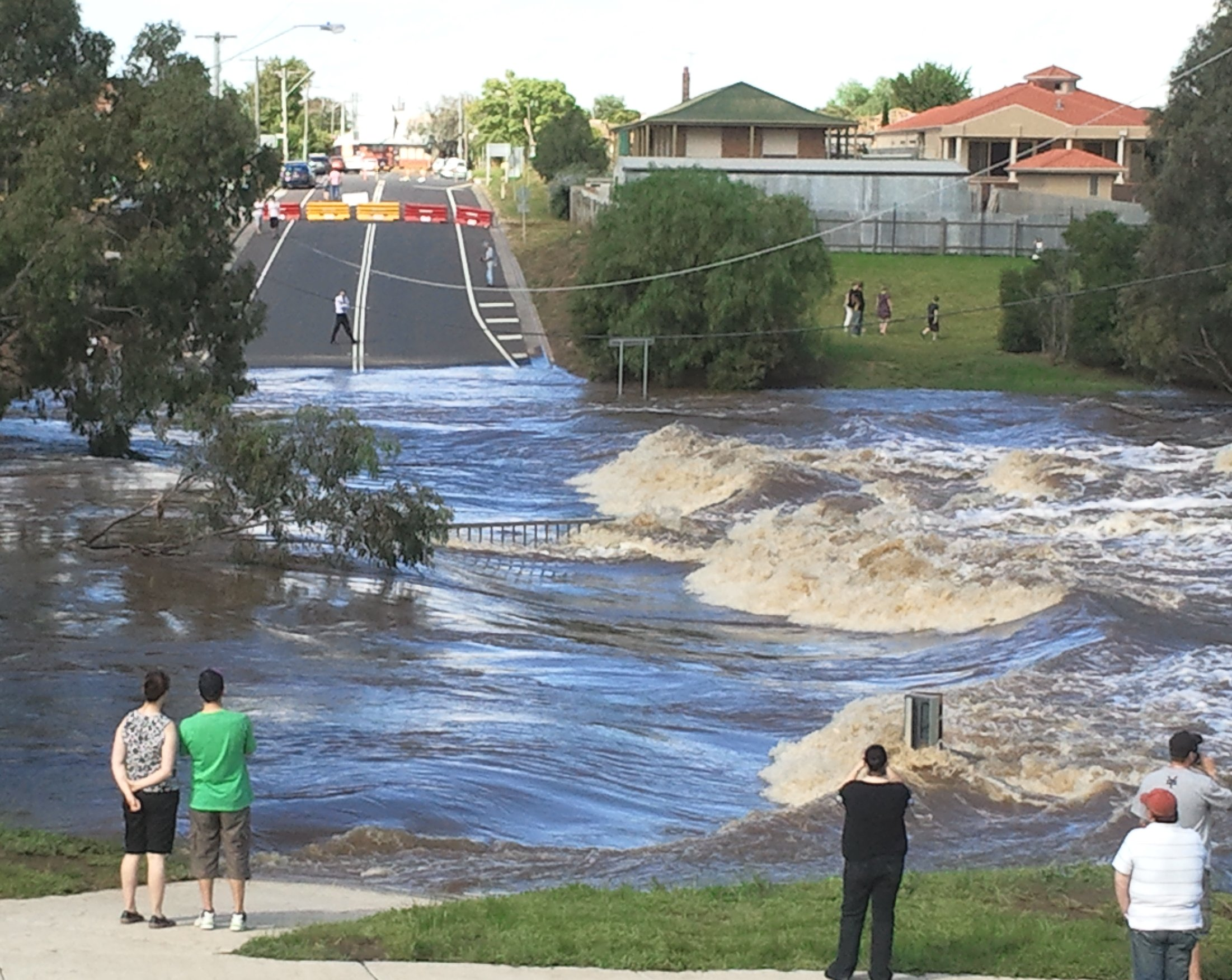
In flood over Cotrell Street in Werribee

== See also ==
- List of rivers of Australia
- Federation Trail
- Werribee River Trail
