= Ravenhall =

Ravenhall may refer to:

- Ravenhall, Victoria, outer suburban locality of Melbourne, Australia
- George E Ravenhall (1886–1977), Australian public servant
- John Ravenhall (born ca. 1941), Australian scouting leader
