= Rockbank =

- Suburb
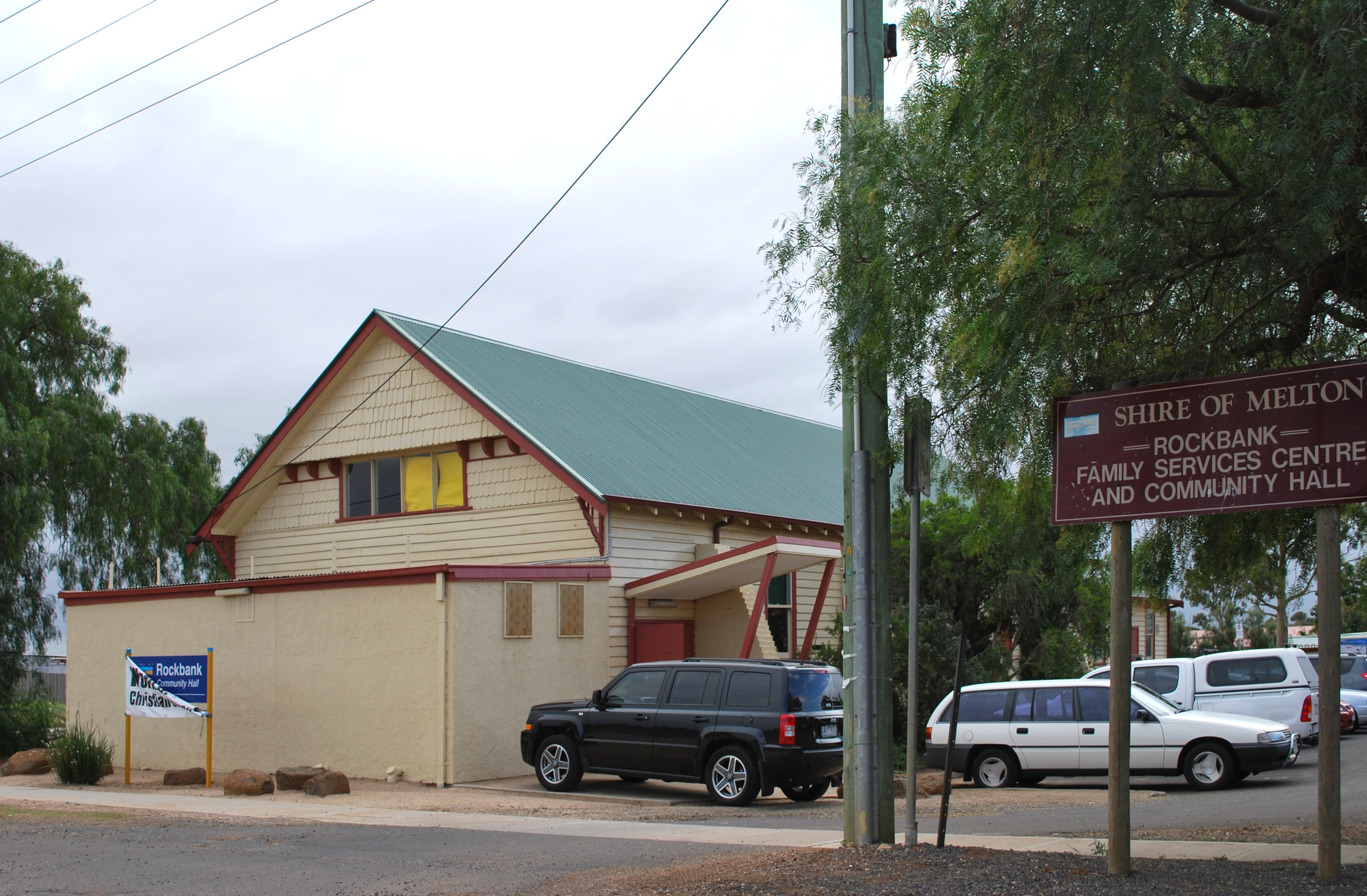
- Rockbank Community Hall

- Interactive map of Rockbank
- Coordinates: 37°44′S 144°40′E
- Country: Australia
- State: Victoria
- City: Melbourne
- LGA: City of Melton
- Location: 28 km (17 mi) from Melbourne; 10 km (6.2 mi) from Melton

Government
  - State electorate: Kororoit
  - Federal division: Gorton
- Elevation: 116 m (381 ft)

Population
  - Total: 2,583 (2021 census)
- Postcode: 3335
Suburbs around Rockbank
Grangefields	Grangefields, Aintree	Aintree
Thornhill Park	Rockbank	Truganina
Fieldstone	Fieldstone	Truganina

Rockbank is a suburb in Melbourne, Victoria, Australia, 28 km (17 mi) west of the Melbourne central business district, located within the City of Melton local government area. Rockbank recorded a population of 2,583 at the 2021 census.

The land contains many large volcanic rocks making it poor for cultivating crops. The rocks have been used to build walls between paddocks – characteristic of the area west of Melbourne. The rich, red volcanic soil in the area has helped build the reputation of local wineries.

Rockbank is also the host to Victoria's annual Olive Festival.

== History ==
Earlier agricultural activities in Rockbank date back to the pastoral exploits of William Cross Yuille on the plains. He founded the pastoral estate of Rockbank, which soon became the largest estate in the Melton district. The former Rockbank pastoral station is now known as the Deanside Woolshed.

Rockbank Post Office opened on 1 January 1862 and closed on 1 July 1996.

New Cambridge Common School (now Rockbank Primary School) opened on 12 October 1868 and is one of Victoria's oldest public schools.

Following a proposal for eleven new suburbs by the City of Melton, the northern portion of Rockbank became the suburb of Aintree in 2017.

== Geography ==
=== Location ===
Rockbank is bounded by the Western Freeway to the north and Greigs Road to the south. The area lies east of the satellite city of Melton and the suburbs of Thornhill Park and Cobblebank, and west of the suburbs of Caroline Springs and Deanside, as well as the development area of Mount Atkinson.

=== Land features ===
The Kororoit Creek runs through Rockbank. Mount Cottrell is the highest land point in the vicinity.

== Facilities ==
=== Education ===
Rockbank has a K-6 school named Rockbank Primary School. There is also a kindergarten.

Multiple childcare facilities also exist in the Rockbank area.

=== Transportation ===
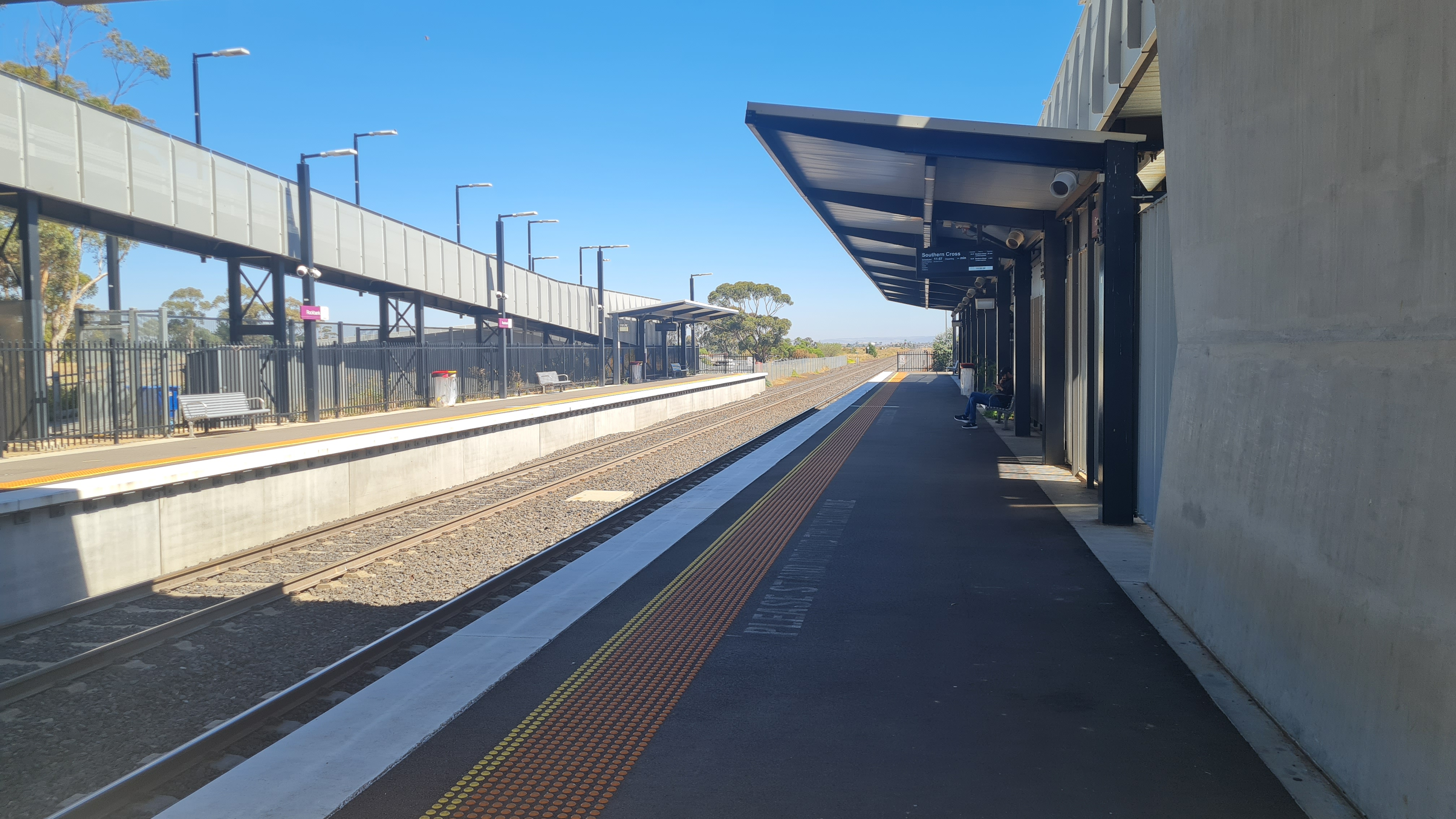
Rockbank railway station

Rockbank railway station is on the Ararat line. The station was upgraded in August 2019 as part of the Regional Rail Revival project.

Rockbank is also serviced by four bus routes and one Night Network bus route:

- 140 from Tarneit Station to Rockbank Station
- 444 from Rockbank Station to Aintree
- 456 from Sunshine station to Melton via Rockbank
- 464 from Watergardens Station to Rockbank Station via Taylors Rd
- 943 from Watergardens station to Melton via Rockbank (Night Network)

=== Sport ===
The town has an Australian rules football and netball team, the Western Rams, competing in Division Two of the Western Football Netball League. They play at the Ian Cowie Recreation Reserve.

=== Other services ===
Rockbank also has a community hall and a general store.

== See also ==
- Kororoit Creek
- Kororoit Creek Trail
