= Staughton =

Staughton may refer to:

Places:

- Staughton College, a secondary school in Melbourne, Australia
- Great Staughton, a village in Huntingdonshire, England, United Kingdom
- Little Staughton, a village in Bedfordshire, England, United Kingdom

People:

- Samuel Thomas Staughton Sr. (1838–1901), English born-Australian politician
- Staughton Lynd (1929-2022), American political activist
- William Staughton (1770–1829), Baptist minister
