= Cobblebank =

- Suburb
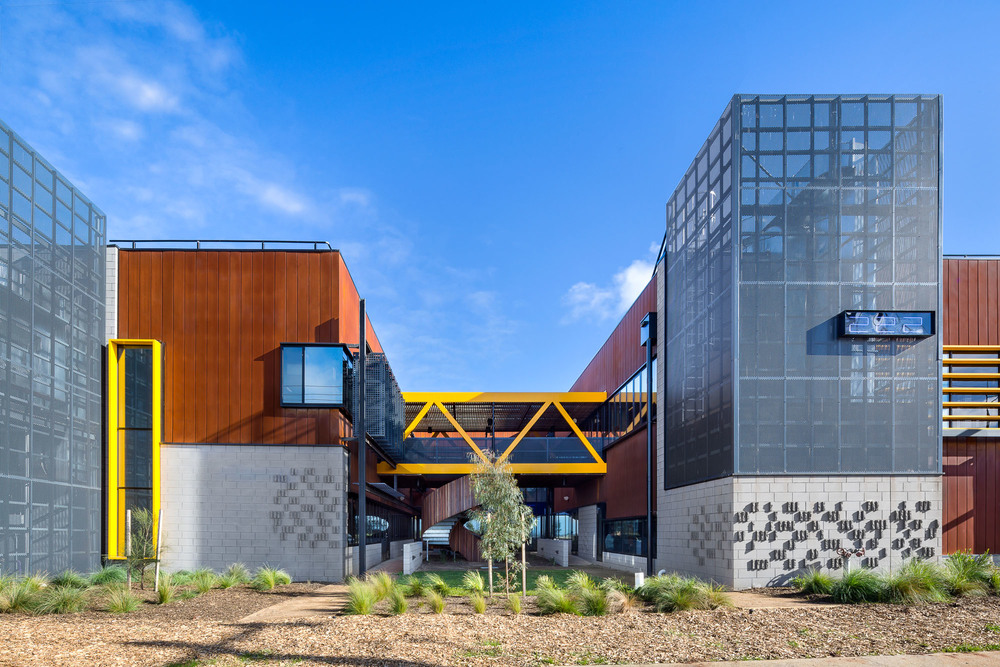
- Western BACE, Cobblebank

- Interactive map of Cobblebank
- Coordinates: 37°42′41″S 144°36′3″E
- Country: Australia
- State: Victoria
- LGA: City of Melton
- Location: 33 km (21 mi) W of Melbourne; 3 km (1.9 mi) SE of Melton
- Established: 2017

Government
  - State electorate: Melton
  - Federal division: Gorton

Population
  - Total: 3,601 (2021 census)
- Postcode: 3338
Suburbs around Cobblebank
Melton	Melton	Grangefields
Melton South	Cobblebank	Thornhill Park
Melton South	Strathtulloh	Thornhill Park

Cobblebank is a suburb in Melbourne, Victoria, Australia, 33 km (21 mi) west of Melbourne's Central Business District, located within the City of Melton local government area. Cobblebank recorded a population of 3,601 at the 2021 census.

Cobblebank is a developing outer suburb that was gazetted by the Office of Geographic Names on 9 February 2017, following a proposal for eleven new suburbs by the City of Melton. The new name officially came into effect in mid-2017. Prior to the suburb's creation, the area was part of Melton South.

== History ==
Cobblebank is bounded to the west by the Toolern Creek, which was gazetted in 1881 as a 'Permanent Reserve for Public Purposes'. The reserve includes the bed of the creek and is nominally 20.12 metres (one chain) wide from the banks of the creek. Aboriginal artefacts have also been found in this area. The district was originally surveyed by Europeans as part of the Parish of Kororoit in the 1840s, with the area been farmed continuously since then, with a small number of industrial buildings, and suburban development commencing in late 2011. A dry-stone wall, built during the early European farming days, has been preserved near Ferris Road. The northern boundary is formed by the Western Freeway, which connects Cobblebank to both Melbourne and Melton (and Ballarat beyond). The northern part of Cobblebank is home to Melton Entertainment Park, a horse racing venue opened in 2009 for harness racing.

== Western BACE ==
At Ferris Road, which runs through the centre of Cobblebank, is the recently completed 'Western Business Accelerator and Centre for Excellence' (Western BACE) a community activity and business development hub for Melbourne's west. The centre offers commercial space for lease, and provides business coaching, and vocational education. Western BACE was built using sustainable principles in 2015 by the City of Melton, with $14.62 million funding from the Australian Federal Government. It forms the first part of the proposed Cobblebank Metropolitan Activity Centre.

== Cobblebank Metropolitan Activity Centre ==
The Cobblebank Metropolitan Activity Centre is a future major regional centre for a projected local population of up to 160,000 people, in Melbourne's rapidly-growing western urban area. Its development will occur over a number of decades, initially evolving from a local suburban hub in its first decade, to a regional business, retail, civic, education, medical, residential, entertainment and recreation centre when complete. A major state indoor basketball arena, Cobblebank Stadium, has been built on the corner of Bridge Road and Ferris Road. A retail centre named Cobblebank Village has also been constructed and features a large supermarket alongside other smaller retail stores. The new Melton Hospital will be built at 245 – 267 Ferris Road, and is projected to open in 2026.

== Transport ==
Cobblebank railway station was completed by the State Government of Victoria on 1 December 2019. The station is 34.39 kilometres from Southern Cross, and was built near the junction of the Melbourne – Ballarat line and Ferris Road. The design of Cobblebank railway station has provision for two express railway tracks, which will most likely be laid after electrification works to Melton are complete.

== Toolern Park ==
Cobblebank is bounded to the east by Mount Cottrell Road, and to the south by the 100 hectare Toolern Park, adjacent to Bridge Road. The regional park is generally to the east of Toolern Creek, and straddles both Cobblebank and the neighbouring suburb of Strathtulloh. As at April 2017 the regional park is still being developed, and presently features an athletics track, sports field, and the Bridge Road Community Centre.

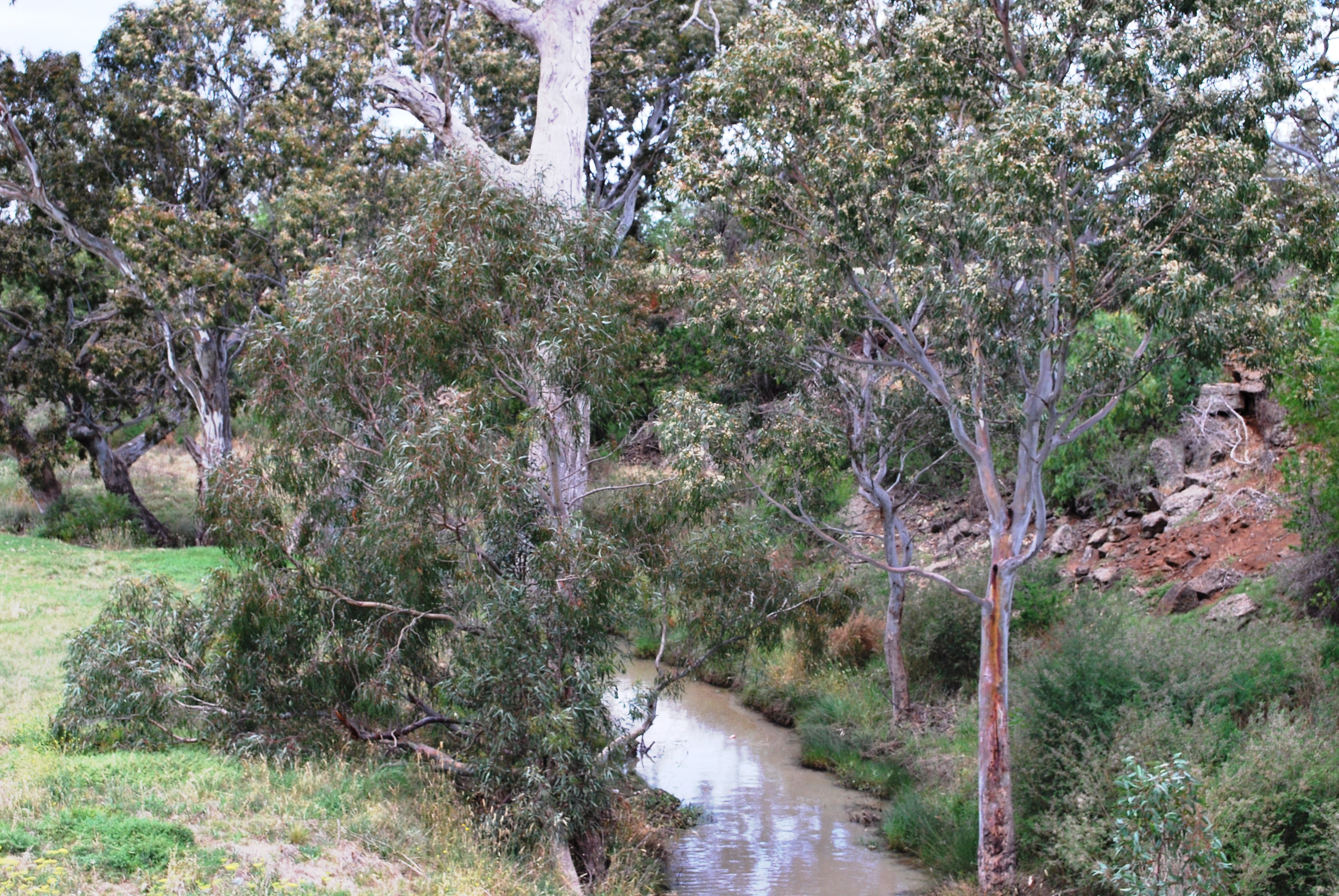
Toolern Creek, Cobblebank
