= Fraser Rise =

- Suburb
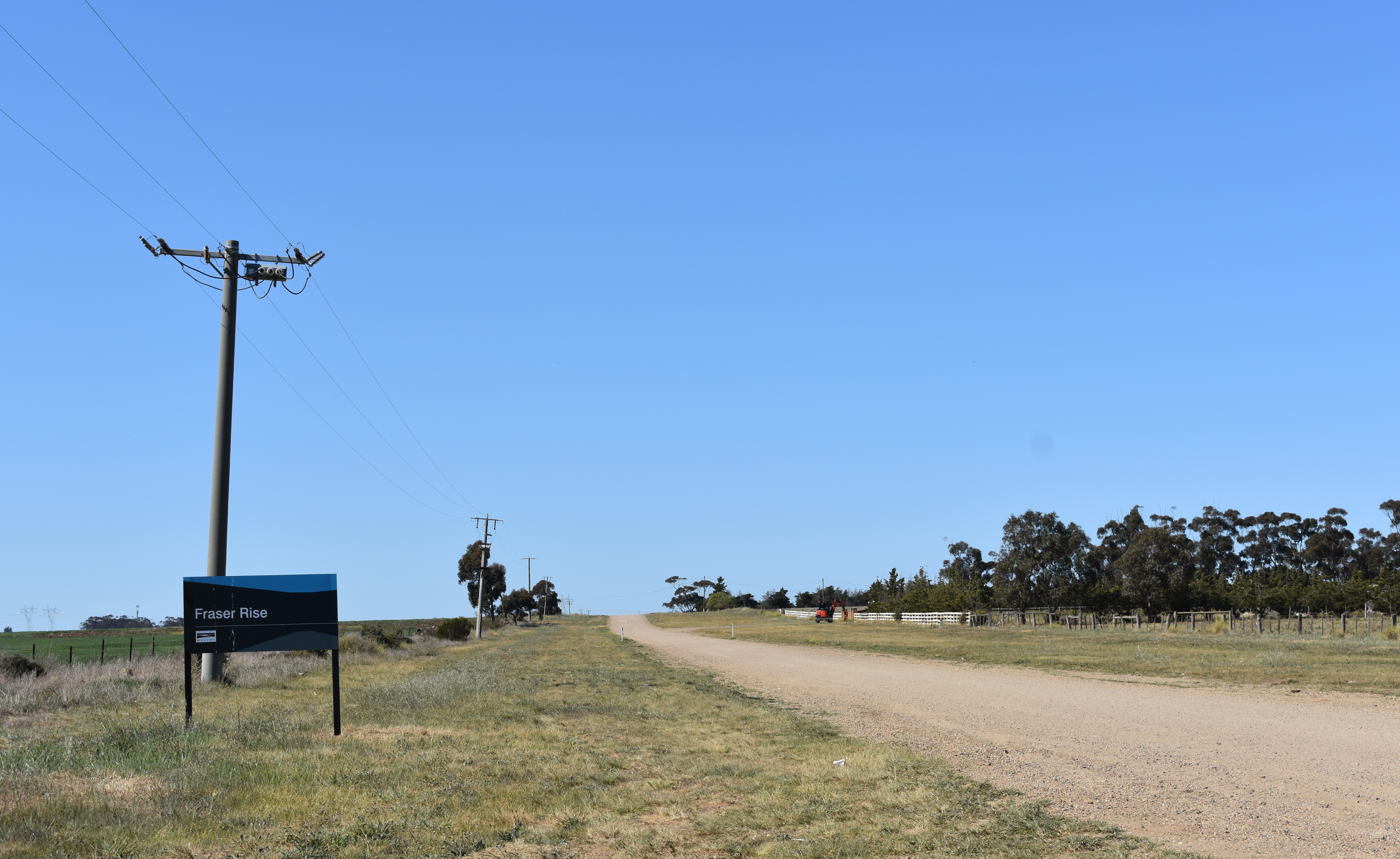
- Locality entry sign, October 2018

- Interactive map of Fraser Rise
- Coordinates: 37°42′15″S 144°42′45″E
- Country: Australia
- State: Victoria
- City: Melbourne
- LGA: City of Melton
- Location: 24 km (15 mi) NW of Melbourne
- Established: 2017

Government
  - State electorate: Sydenham
  - Federal division: Gorton

Population
  - Total: 9,097 (2021 census)
- Postcode: 3336
Suburbs around Fraser Rise
Plumpton	Plumpton	Hillside
Bonnie Brook	Fraser Rise	Caroline Springs
Deanside	Deanside	Caroline Springs

Fraser Rise is a suburb in Melbourne, Victoria, Australia, 24 km (15 mi) North West of Melbourne's Central Business District, located within the City of Melton local government area. Fraser Rise recorded a population of 9,097 at the 2021 census.

The suburb was gazetted by the Office of Geographic Names on 9 February 2017, following a proposal for eleven new suburbs by the City of Melton. The new name officially came into effect in mid-year 2017. Prior to the suburb's creation, the area was part of Plumpton.

== Transport ==
Fraser Rise is a largely car-dependent suburb. The north of the suburb abuts the Melton Highway, which later feeds into the Calder Freeway. The Western Freeway is also located a short distance from the suburb's southern boundary, with through-connections to the Melbourne CBD via the Deer Park Bypass and Metropolitan Ring Road.

Two bus routes service Fraser Rise:

- 463 : Watergardens Station – Caroline Springs. Operated by CDC Melbourne.
- 464 : Watergardens Station – Rockbank Station via Taylors Road. Operated by CDC Melbourne.

== Education ==
There is one primary school in Fraser Rise, Wiyal Primary School, which opened in 2026.

The suburb also has one secondary school: Springside West Secondary College, a co-educational school catering for Year 7-12 students.

== Sport ==
Caroline Springs George Cross FC are based in Fraser Rise and compete in Division 1 of the Victorian Premier League, the second-highest tier of soccer in Victoria. The team's home stadium is the City Vista Recreation Reserve.
