= Bonnie Brook =

- Suburb
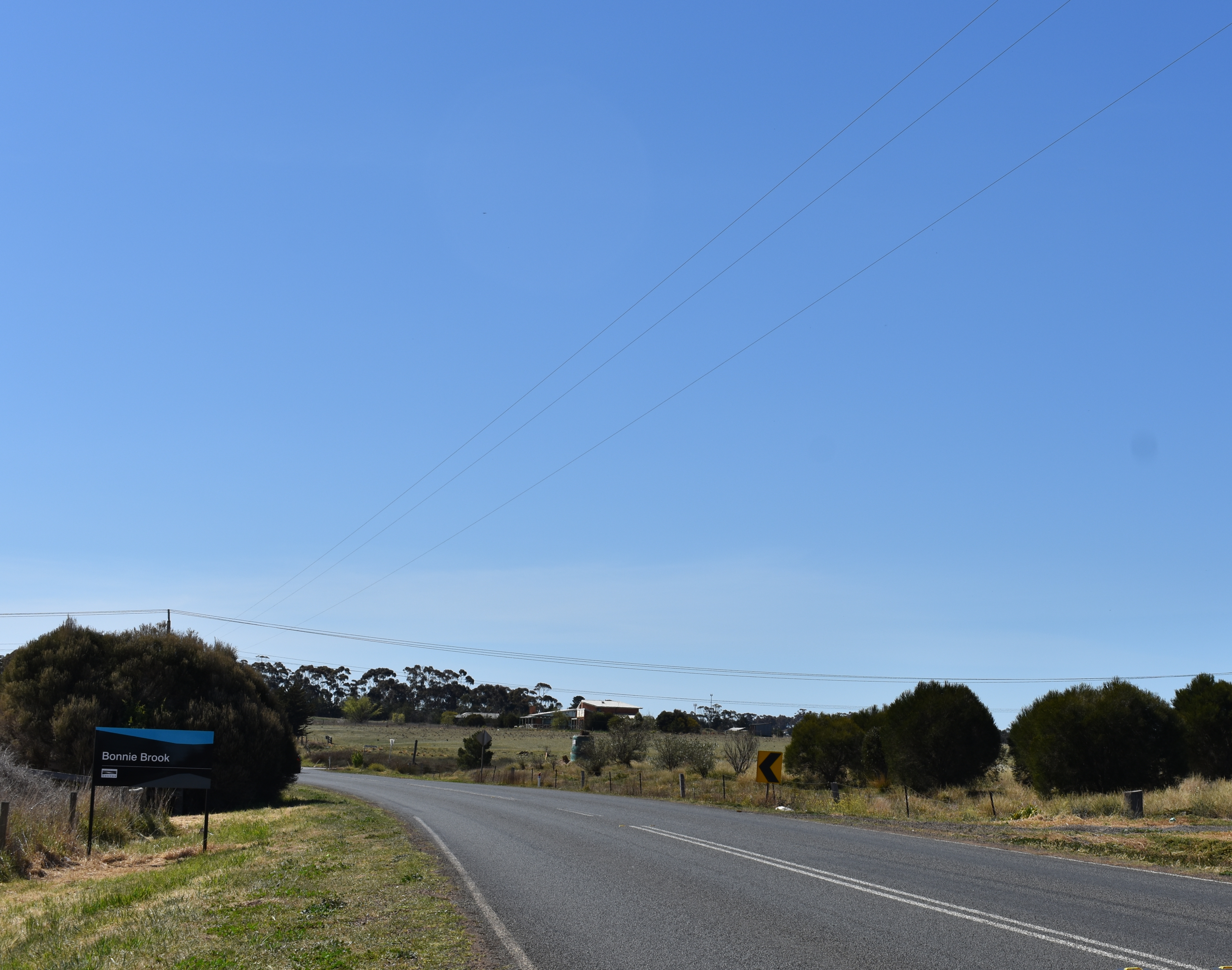
- Locality entry sign at Bonnie Brook, October 2018

- Interactive map of Bonnie Brook
- Coordinates: 37°41′40″S 144°40′10″E
- Country: Australia
- State: Victoria
- City: Melbourne
- LGA: City of Melton
- Location: 28 km (17 mi) NW of Melbourne; 6 km (3.7 mi) E of Melton
- Established: 2017

Government
  - State electorate: Kororoit
  - Federal division: Gorton

Population
  - Total: 333 (2021 census)
- Postcode: 3335
Suburbs around Bonnie Brook
Melton	Plumpton	Plumpton
Grangefields	Bonnie Brook	Fraser Rise
Grangefields	Aintree	Deanside

Bonnie Brook is a suburb in Melbourne, Victoria, Australia, 28 km (17 mi) north-west of Melbourne's central business district, located within the City of Melton local government area. Bonnie Brook recorded a population of 333 at the 2021 census.

The suburb is named after the Bonnie Doone historic homestead that was built in 1906 following the breakup of the Clarke pastoral estate, along a brook stemming off of Kororoit Creek.

== History ==
Prior to the suburb's creation, the area was a part of Plumpton. The suburb was gazetted on 9 February 2017, as part of the project to develop eleven new suburbs in the City of Melton and double its population by 2046.

== Transport ==
=== Roads ===
Bonnie Brook is a car-dependent suburb due to it being in an early stage of development. Until the Aintree Major Town Centre project is completed, this is unlikely to change. The urbanised areas lie along the major arterials Taylors Road and Plumpton Road, whilst the rural parts of the suburb lie along Melton Highway and Leakes Road.

=== Bus ===
One bus route services Bonnie Brook:

- 464 : Watergardens Station – Rockbank Station via Taylors Road. Operated by CDC Melbourne.

=== Train ===
Rockbank Station is the closest rail connection to Bonnie Brook, being a V/Line operated station on the Ararat and Ballarat lines.

== Community facilities ==
A Sikh temple and community centre, the Sri Guru Singh Sabha, was opened in 2023 on Leakes Road.
