= Aintree, Victoria =

Aintree
- Suburb
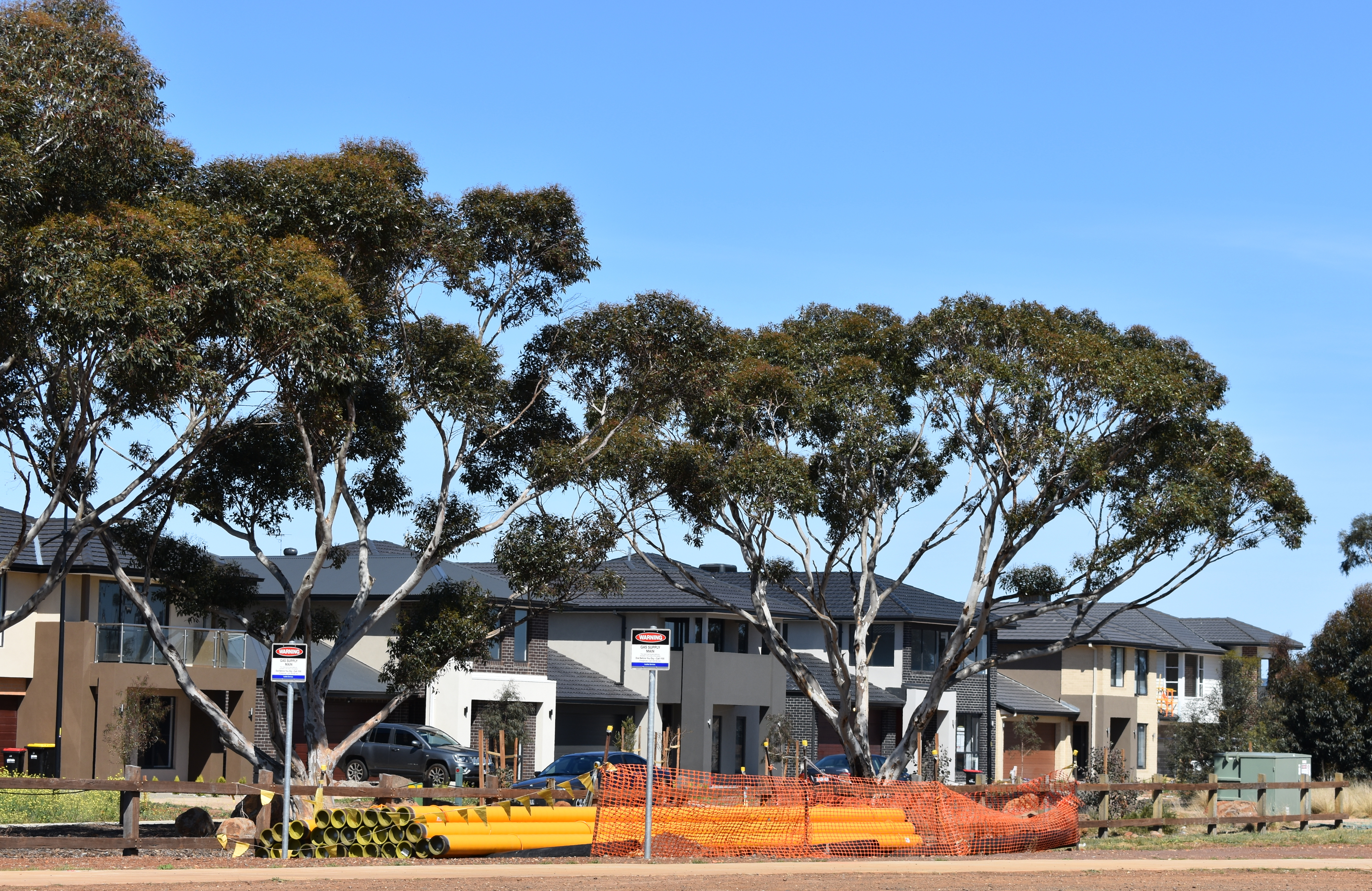
- Houses in the Woodlea subdivision, October 2018

- Interactive map of Aintree
- Coordinates: 37°43′05″S 144°40′05″E
- Country: Australia
- State: Victoria
- City: Melbourne
- LGA: City of Melton
- Location: 28 km (17 mi) W of Melbourne
- Established: 2017

Government
  - State electorate: Kororoit
  - Federal division: Gorton

Population
  - Total: 7,982 (2021 census)
- Postcode: 3336
Suburbs around Aintree
Bonnie Brook	Bonnie Brook	Deanside
Grangefields	Aintree	Deanside
Rockbank	Rockbank	Truganina

Aintree is a suburb in Melbourne, Victoria, Australia, 28 km (17 mi) west of the Melbourne central business district, located within the City of Melton local government area. Aintree recorded a population of 7,982 at the 2021 census.

The area around Kororoit Creek where Aintree is situated was originally used for equestrian sports. As such, the suburb was named after the Aintree racecourse in England, from which many of the racehorses for both events and breeding were supplied.

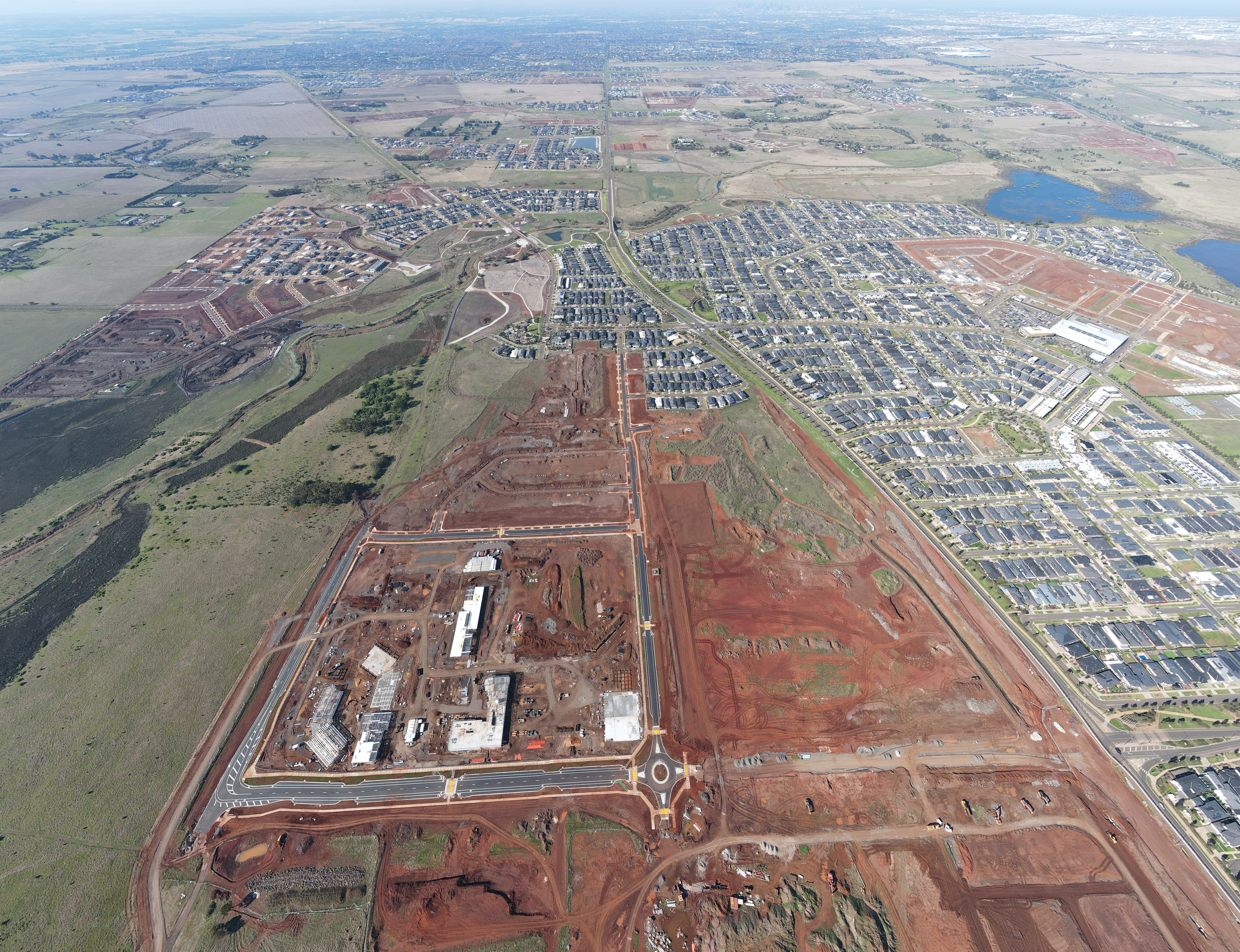
Aerial view of Aintree

== History ==
Prior to the gazetting of Aintree, the land was part of Rockbank, and was home to a military wireless receiver station operated by Amalgamated Wireless Australasia. The station played a significant role in supporting Australian and US forces in the Pacific during World War II, and provided Australia's first link to the Imperial Wireless Service. The site was decommissioned and removed in 1969, allowing the land to eventually be developed. The Aintree Walk of Honour was constructed on top of this former telecommunications site to honour its history.

Aintree was one of eleven new suburbs gazetted on 8 February 2017 in the City of Melton to support its rapid growth. By 2046, Melton its projected to double in size to 470,000 residents, with each of these new suburbs creating space for 20,000 new residents. The majority of the suburb has since been developed by Woodlea Estate.

On 26 October 2019, Aintree hosted a world record event. The record for the largest soccer lesson was broken by 130 people, with the total number of participants reaching 835. The record has since been broken by the San Jose Earthquakes.

== Education ==
=== Public Schools ===
- Aintree Primary School
- Dharra Specialist School (P-12)
- Yarrabing Secondary College

=== Independent Schools ===
- Bacchus Marsh Grammar (P-12)

== Transport ==
=== Roads ===
Aintree has a Western Freeway exit located immediately outside the suburb, connecting it to Melbourne via the Deer Park Bypass. Taylors Road is the other major arterial that links Aintree to Caroline Springs and other suburbs, as the surrounding area is still being constructed.

=== Bus ===
Two bus routes service Aintree:

- 444 : Rockbank Station – Aintree. Operated by Transit Systems Victoria.
- 464 : Watergardens Station – Rockbank Station via Taylors Road. Operated by CDC Melbourne.

=== Train ===
Aintree is serviced by the nearby Rockbank Railway Station, reconstructed in 2019 to meet the needs of the growing area. It is a V/Line operated station on the Ararat and Ballarat lines.

== Recreation ==
The suburb has many parks and open spaces, including Frontier Reserve and Aintree Recreation Reserve, home to the Melton Warriors Rugby Union Club. Other parks in the area include Bullion Park, Arbourton Park, Wireless Park, Jackwood Park and Nugget Park.

The site hosts a regular 5 kilometres (3.1 mi) parkrun.
