= Thornhill Park =

- Suburb
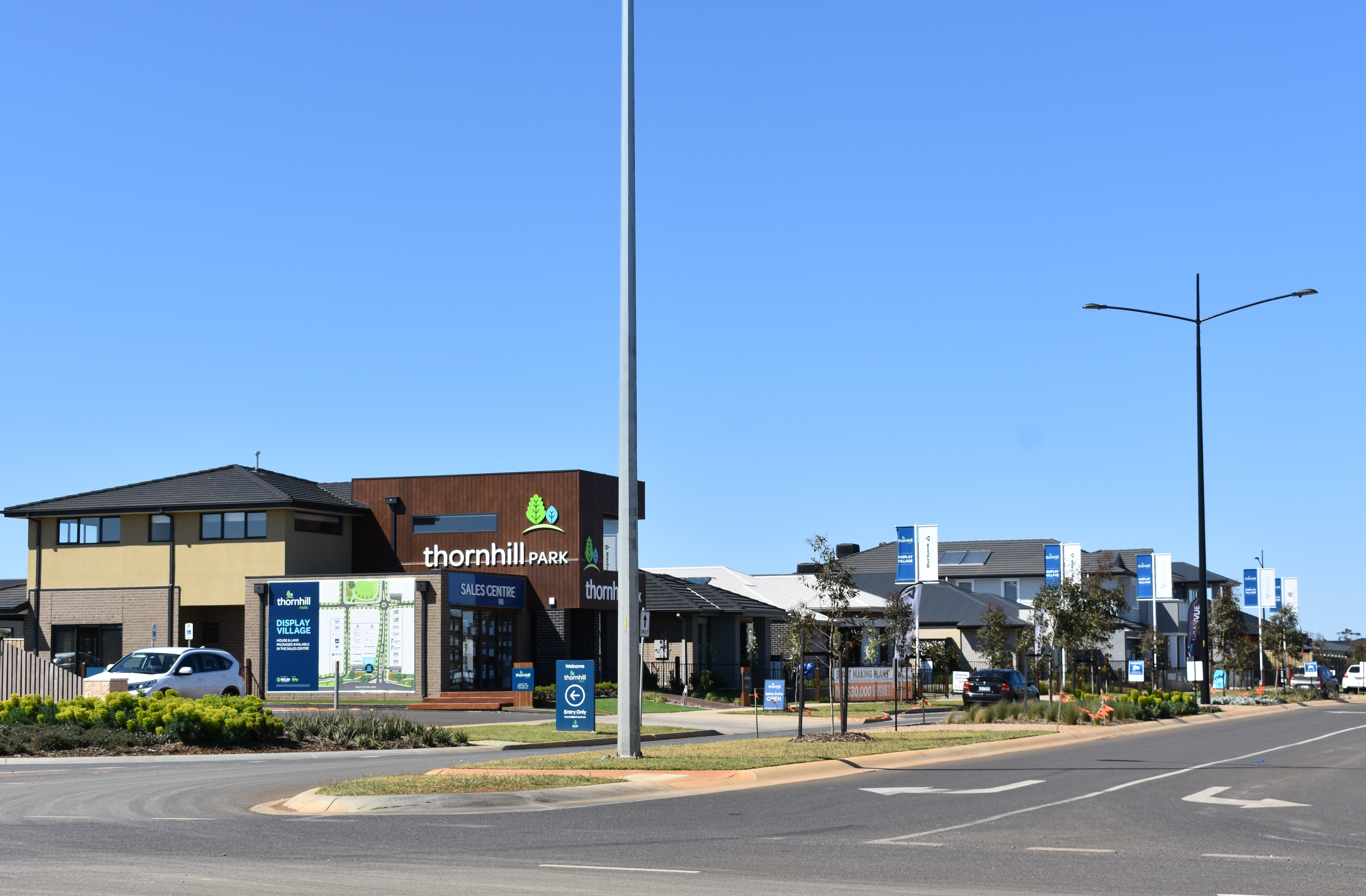
- Entrance to the Thornhill Park display village, October 2018

- Interactive map of Thornhill Park
- Coordinates: 37°43′45″S 144°37′30″E
- Country: Australia
- State: Victoria
- City: Melbourne
- LGA: City of Melton
- Location: 32 km (20 mi) from Melbourne
- Established: 2017

Government
  - State electorate: Kororoit
  - Federal division: Gorton

Population
  - Total: 3,066 (SAL 2021)
- Postcode: 3335
Suburbs around Thornhill Park
Melton	Grangefields	Grangefields
Cobblebank, Strathtulloh	Thornhill Park	Rockbank, Fieldstone
Mount Cottrell	Mount Cottrell	Mount Cottrell

Thornhill Park is a suburb in Melbourne, Victoria, Australia, 32 km (20 mi) west of Melbourne's Central Business District, located within the City of Melton local government area. Thornhill Park recorded a population of 3,066 at the 2021 census.

The suburb was gazetted by the Office of Geographic Names on 9 February 2017, following a proposal for eleven new suburbs by the City of Melton. The new name officially came into effect in mid-2017.

Prior to the suburb's creation, the area was mostly part of Rockbank, with a small section previously part of Mount Cottrell, in the south.

== Recreation ==
The Thornhill Park Retarding Basin and Wetland project is a critical environmental infrastructure designed to reduce flooding risks in the area. Managed by Melbourne Water, the basin collects and treats stormwater, releasing it slowly to protect homes and maintain natural water flows. Recent landscaping works include the installation of a fitness area, viewing platforms, boardwalks, and planting over 190,000 plants to enhance the wetland ecosystem and community amenity.

== Demographics and Community Profile ==
The suburb has a young median age of 29 years, significantly lower than the Victorian average of 38, reflecting a family-oriented community with a high proportion of children aged 0–9 years. The population is culturally diverse, with many families from non-English speaking backgrounds, contributing to a vibrant multicultural environment.

== Education ==
Thornhill Park Primary School
St Padre Pio Catholic Primary School
Thornhill Montessori Early Learning Centre
Thornhill Park Children’s and Community Centre
Aspire Early Education & Kindergarten Thornhill Village
Aspire Early Education & Kindergarten Thornhill Park
St Padre Pio Catholic Children's Hub
Eden Academy Thornhill Park
Creative Hands ELC - Thornhill Park
