= Deanside =

- Suburb
- Townhouses in Rosewood Estate at the intersection of Merindah Boulevard and Taylors Road, Deanside, Victoria, in September 2026

- Interactive map of Deanside
- Coordinates: 37.72657°S 144.6972°E
- Country: Australia
- State: Victoria
- LGA: City of Melton
- Location: 24 km (15 mi) from Melbourne
- Established: 2017

Government
  - State electorates: Sydenham; Kororoit
  - Federal division: Gorton

Population
  - Total: 654 (2021 census)
- Postcode: 3336
Suburbs around Deanside
Bonnie Brook	Fraser Rise	Fraser Rise
Aintree	Deanside	Caroline Springs
Truganina	Truganina	Ravenhall

Deanside is a suburb in Melbourne, Victoria, Australia, 24 km (15 mi) west of Melbourne's Central Business District, located within the City of Melton local government area. Deanside recorded a population of 654 at the 2021 census.

The suburb was gazetted by the Office of Geographic Names on 9 February 2017, following a proposal for eleven new suburbs by the City of Melton, and officially came into effect in mid-2017.

Prior to the suburb's creation, the area was split between Rockbank and Plumpton.

== Historical Significance ==
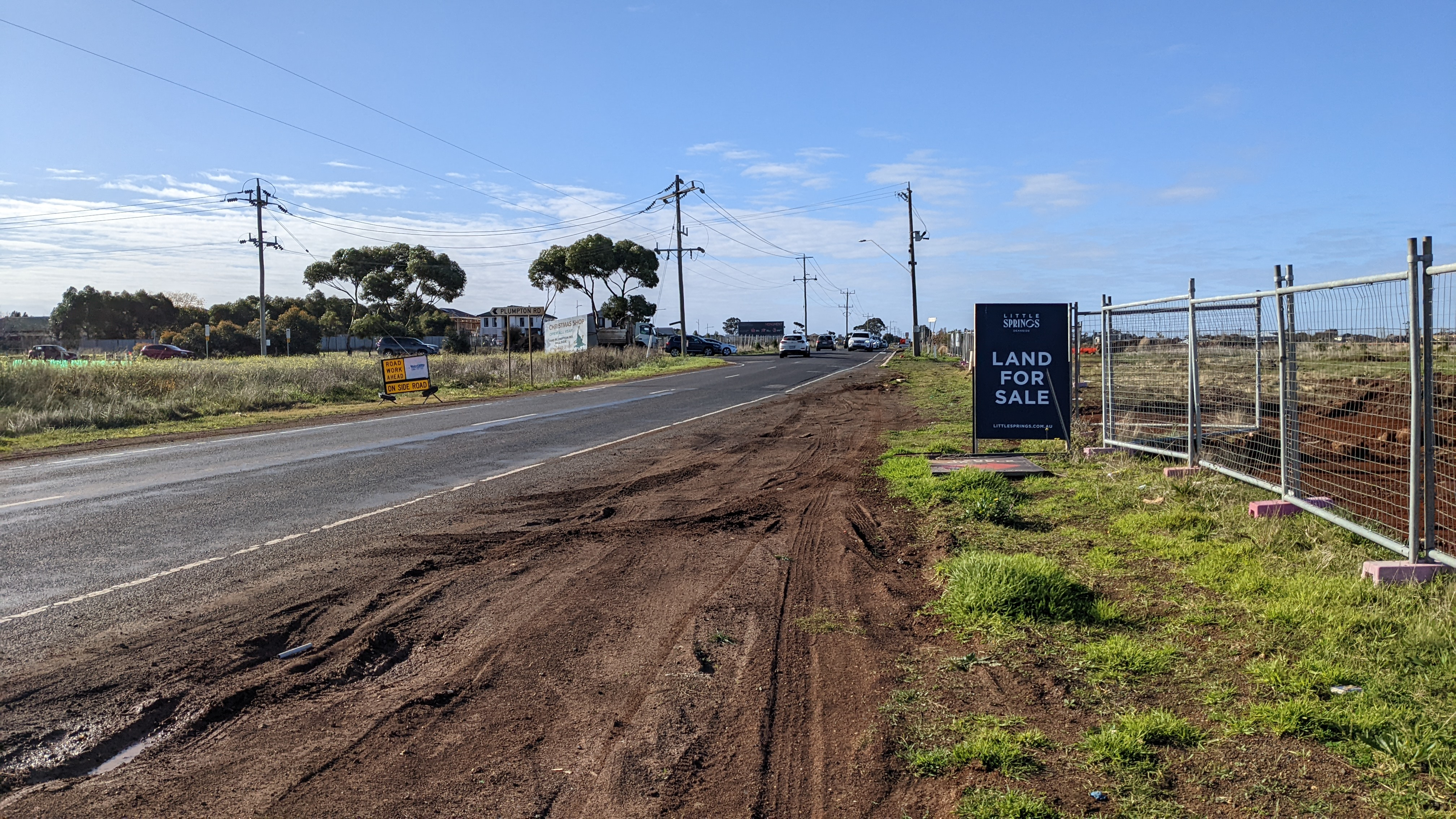
Much of the suburb is now designated for low-density residential development, such as that seen here on Taylors Road near Plumpton Road.

The suburb now known as Deanside has a rich agricultural and archaeological history. The Deanside Homestead Complex is the core part of the Rockbank pastoral run originally owned by notable pastoralist William Cross Yuille (1819-1894) and subsequently sold to William John Turner Clarke (1805-1874) who owned the 40,000 acre Rockbank Estate. Following the sale in 1853, Deanside became the head station of Clarke's pastoralist empire. The Deanside Homestead Complex is an agricultural complex including the archaeological remains of a mansion and other farm-related structures which was one of the first pastoral properties held in the district. On the historical significance of the area, The Victorian Heritage Council claims that "The homestead complex is an important and early example of a prosperous rural holding in mid to late nineteenth-century Victoria."

== Transport ==
=== Road ===
Deanside is a developing suburb, and currently lacks many transport connections. In the absence of many transport options, the suburb is a car-centric suburb, and primarily reliant on Taylors Road and Sinclairs Road.

=== Bus ===
Two bus routes service Deanside:

- 456 : Melton – Sunshine Station via Caroline Springs. Operated by Transit Systems Victoria.
- 464 : Watergardens Station – Rockbank Station via Taylors Road. Operated by CDC Melbourne.
