= Melton South, Victoria =

Melton South
- Suburb
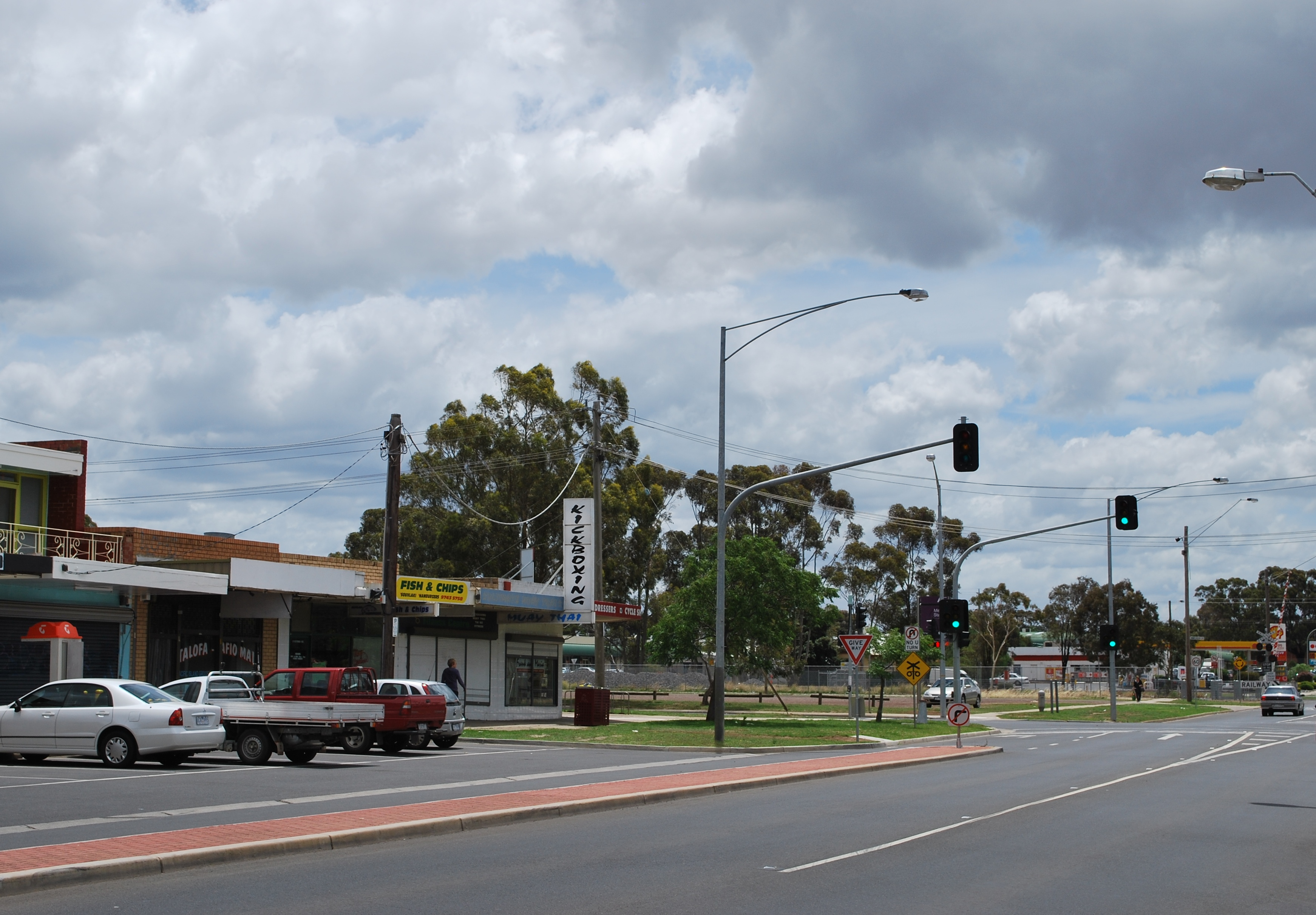
- Shopping strip, Exford Road

- Interactive map of Melton South
- Coordinates: 37°42′11″S 144°34′19″E
- Country: Australia
- State: Victoria
- City: Melbourne
- LGA: City of Melton
- Location: 37 km (23 mi) from Melbourne central business district

Government
  - State electorate: Melton
  - Federal division: Hawke

Population
  - Total: 11,362 (2021 census)
- Postcode: 3338
Suburbs around Melton South
Melton West	Melton	Plumpton
Brookfield	Melton South	Rockbank
Exford	Exford	Mount Cottrell

Melton South is a suburb in Melbourne, Victoria, Australia, 37 km (23 mi) west of Melbourne's Central Business District, located within the City of Melton local government area. Melton South recorded a population of 11,362 at the 2021 census.

== History ==
The Post Office opened on 1 January 1917, when Melton South was a sparsely populated rural area.

== Transport ==
Melton railway station is located within Melton South. Rail is the major form of public transport connecting the satellite city of Melton with the Melbourne Central Business District and surrounding suburbs. The station is located on the Serviceton railway line and is served by V/Line trains. Transit Systems Victoria bus services 453, 455, 457, 458 and 459 connect Melton South and the station to the rest of Melton. Transit Systems Victoria also operates the 452 to Eynesbury and the 454 to Cobblebank railway station.

== Facilities ==
Melton South has two shopping districts: one located on Exford Road; the other on Station Road. The centre on Station Road contains a Coles supermarket, chemist and a range of fresh food providers.

There are a number of parks in Melton South, including Blackwood Drive Reserve, Melton South Oval and Mount Carberry, a small hill located in a recreational reserve among suburban housing. There is also currently a Country Fire Authority station located there. A cycle path follows Toolern Creek to the east of the suburb: Toolern Creek Trail

== Education ==
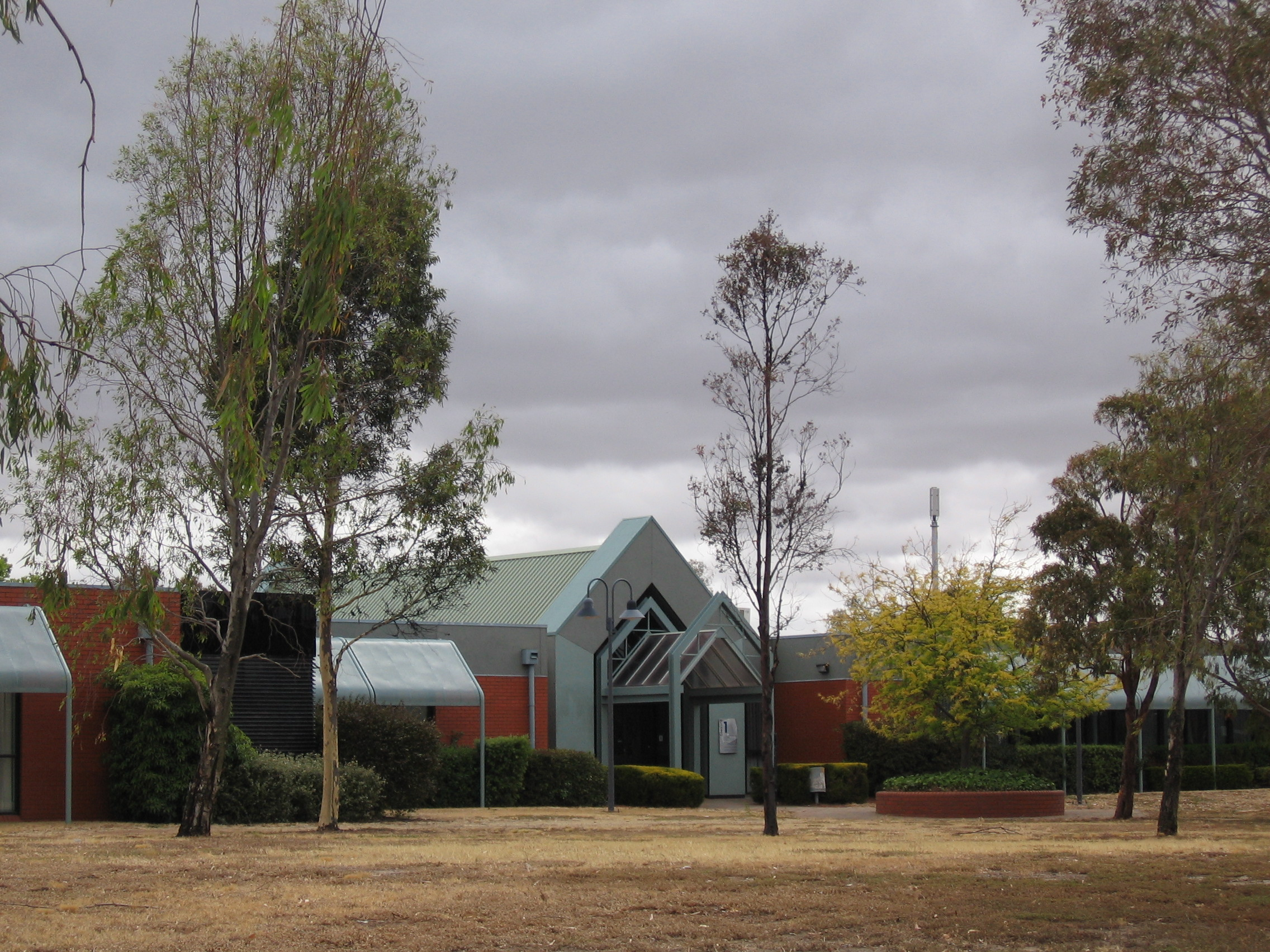
The Melton Campus of Victoria University, Wilson Road

The area is home to many educational facilities

Primary State Schools:

- Coburn Primary School
- Melton South Primary School

Catholic Primary Schools:

- St Anthony of Padua Primary School

State Secondary Schools:

- Staughton College
- Melton Secondary College

Higher Education:

- Victoria University, Melton Campus

== Health ==
The area has one General Practitioners office, on Brooklyn Road. The early 1990s saw the Melton Private Hospital close down to become a nursing home (located on Exford Road). The hospital was popular for many births in the 1970s and 1980s, however the private fees made the hospital less popular as time went by. Women must now go to Bacchus Marsh or Sunshine Hospitals to give birth.

== Sport ==
Melton South has an Australian Rules team competing in the Ballarat Football League.

== See also ==
- Melton (suburb)
