= Grangefields =

- Suburb
- Interactive map of Grangefields
- Coordinates: 37°42′15″S 144°38′15″E
- Country: Australia
- State: Victoria
- LGA: City of Melton
- Location: 31 km (19 mi) W of Melbourne; 5 km (3.1 mi) SE of Melton
- Established: 2017

Government
  - State electorate: Kororoit
  - Federal division: Gorton

Population
  - Total: 132 (2021 census)
- Postcode: 3335
Suburbs around Grangefields
Melton	Plumpton	Bonnie Brook
Melton	Grangefields	Aintree
Cobblebank	Thornhill Park	Rockbank

Grangefields is a suburb in Melbourne, Victoria, Australia, 31 km (19 mi) west of Melbourne's Central Business District, located within the City of Melton local government area. Grangefields recorded a population of 132 at the 2021 census.

The suburb was gazetted by the Office of Geographic Names on 9 February 2017, following a proposal for eleven new suburbs by the City of Melton. The name officially came into effect in mid-2017.

Prior to the suburb's creation, the area was part of Rockbank.
