= Werribee Secondary College =

Location
- Duncans Road, Werribee, Melbourne, Victoria; Australia; 37°54′23″S 144°40′07″E

Information
- Type: Government high school
- Motto: Live Worthily
- Established: 1956; 70 years ago
- Oversight: Victorian Department of Education
- Council President: Damian Marinaro
- Principal: Amanda J. Mullins
- Teaching staff: 130.1 FTE (2025)
- Years: 7–12
- Enrolment: 1637
- Student to teacher ratio: ≈ 1:11
- Campus type: Suburban
- Houses: 'Baanh' 'Biik' 'Kupkupbayi' 'Nhawiinh'
- Colours: Navy and maroon
- Accreditations: International Baccalaureate; Select Entry Accelerated Learning
- Affiliations: Council of International Schools
- Website: werribeesc.vic.edu.au

Werribee Secondary College (abbreviated as WSC) is a government high school in Werribee, a suburb of Melbourne, Victoria, Australia. The College is operated by the Victorian Department of Education.

Established in 1956, the College enrolled, in 2025, approximately 1637 students from Year 7 to Year 12, of whom less than one percent identified as Indigenous Australians and 72 percent were from a language background other than English. Since 2000, Werribee Secondary College has experienced heavy demand for enrolments at Year 7 and at other levels. To manage this, a ceiling was placed on the total school enrolment.

The college established an International Students Program in 2000 and attracts international students. The college has relationships with schools in USA, Spain and Japan. The college was accredited with the Council of International Schools (CIS) in 2006. Since 2013 the College was the first Victorian Government school to offer students the choice of the International Baccalaureate Diploma Programme alongside the Victorian Certificate of Education (VCE) or VCE Vocational Major (VCE-VM). Students will select the senior programme (VCE, VCE-VM or IB) which best suits their individual interests and learning styles.

== History ==
In May 2004, the college was hit by a massive fire that destroyed the school's technology and textiles wing. It caused up to A$2 million damage, including the destruction of students' VCE assignments. Junior students had up to 12 days off school while portable classrooms were brought to the school site.

In August 2006, Werribee Secondary College received accreditation from the Council of International Schools.

In 2011, Werribee Secondary College became the first state school in Victoria to offer the International Baccalaureate Diploma program (it had previously only been available at fifteen private schools).

In December 2009, it was reported that four teachers from the school were taking legal action for psychological damage resulting from bullying and harassment by colleagues. Earlier in the same year, another staff member was awarded up to $140,000 in compensation as a result of his treatment by the school. Another case against the school was before the Supreme Court in October 2013.

In 2014, a case brought by Peter Doulis against the Department resulted in Doulis being awarded damages and costs in excess of $1.2 million. It was also revealed by The Age in February 2015 that the Principal of the College received a public service medal for his services to public education despite the school being involved in another case whereby a female staff member received a "six figure damages payout for psychological injuries" which resulted from her treatment by the school.

On the night of January 2024 two teenagers broke into Werribee Secondary College. Police responded and the teenagers fled to the college roof. After negotiations they descended and were arrested.

In February 2026, the Principle announced that a history teacher within the school was charged with child sex offence and is being let off due to the seriousness of the charges, the court trial will start at May 22 of 2026.

=== SELP program ===
The college holds a SEAL (Select Entry Accelerated Learning) accreditation with the Academy of Accredited SEAL schools (TAASS), a for profit group which has taken over such accreditation since the department of education dropped SEAL schools programs in 2014. The college is the only school in Wyndham to hold this program. At Year 7, entry into the program requires students to accept their school enrollment and complete a placement test. For Years 8 and 9, external testing is replaced by an invitation process for current students based on progress reports, NAPLAN scores, and Semester 1 results. Year 10 students may have the opportunity to apply for an early commencement VCE subject.

== Houses ==
The college has newly added four houses. Houses are based on Indigenous names with points being earned from school events such as the Swimming and Athletic Sports Carnivals. The houses are:

House	Colour	Meaning
Baanh	Blue	Water
Biik	Red	Earth
Kupkupbayi	Green	The Bush
Nhawiinh	Yellow	Sun

== Notable alumni ==
- Aisha Dee – Chasing Life actress
- Merv Hughes – former Australian test cricketer
- Shanina Shaik – Australian model
- Mike Sheahan – Herald Sun Australian rules football writer

== See also ==
- List of government schools in Victoria
