= Werribee Gorge State Park =

Australian state park in Victoria

- IUCN category III (natural monument or feature)
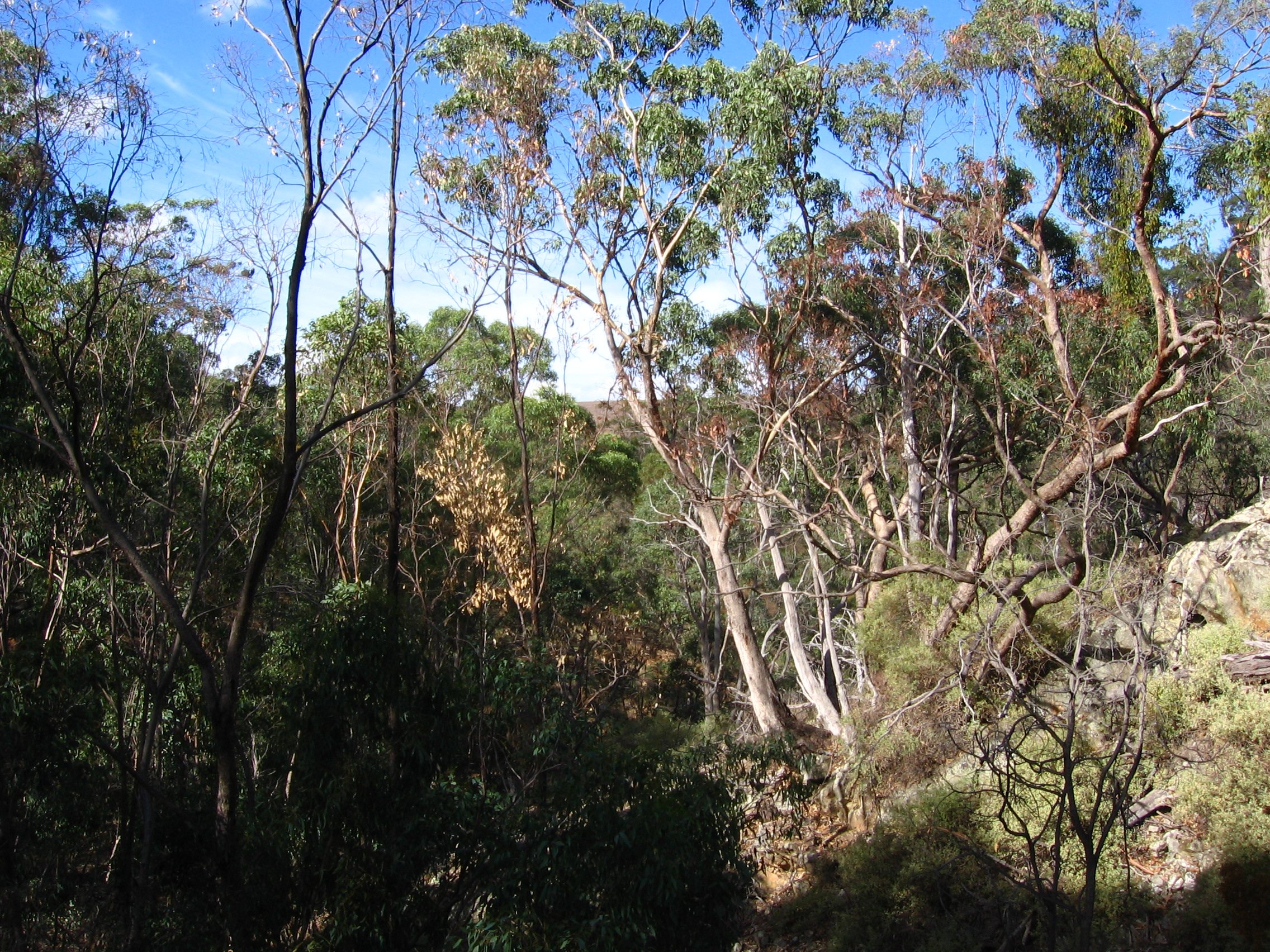
- Bushland at Werribee Gorge

- Location within Victoria
- Location: Victoria
- Nearest city: Bacchus Marsh
- Coordinates: 37.66°S 144.35°E
- Area: 5.75 km^{2} (2.22 sq mi)
- Established: 1978
- Governing body: Parks Victoria
- Website: Official website

Werribee Gorge State Park is a state park in Victoria, Australia. It is located near Bacchus Marsh and is used by bushwalkers and rock climbers, who are attracted to its views and geological features.

== Werribee Gorge ==
The main feature of this park is the Werribee Gorge, through which the Werribee River meanders. This gorge has acquired some renown throughout the 20th century for its geological value.

Werribee Gorge has attracted the attention of geologists last century as one of the earliest known ancient glacial deposits, parts of which can be seen. The 200m deep gorge was formed about a million years ago when movements along a fault in the Earth's crust steepened the river's gradient. Since then the stream has continued to deepen the gorge through underlying rock to ancient sediments deposited in a sea more than 400 million years ago. Other geological events that have since occurred include the advance and retreat of an ice sheet and the inflow of volcanic lava.

There is a walking track which winds itself through the gorge, which is used by bushwalkers and locals.

== Getting there ==
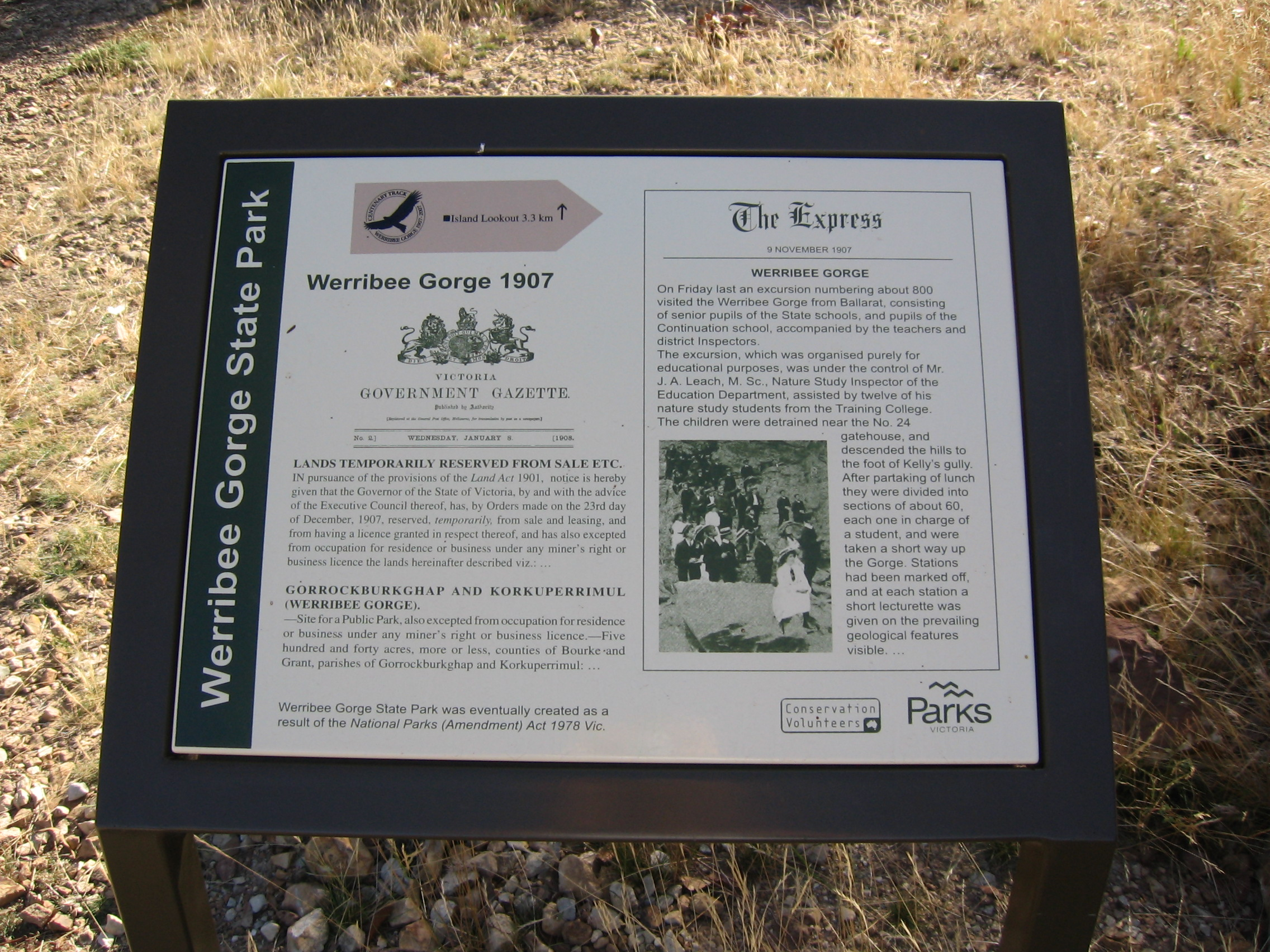
Information sign

Werribee Gorge State Park is about 8 km west of Bacchus Marsh and can be approached by two routes. The first is via the Western Freeway and the Pentland Hills Road to Myers Road, a gravel road steep in places. This provides access to the Gorge itself. The second is via Ironbark Road (the Ballan-Ingliston Road) which is approached from the Bacchus Marsh-Anakie Road.

== See also ==
- Protected areas of Victoria
