= Strathtulloh =

- Suburb
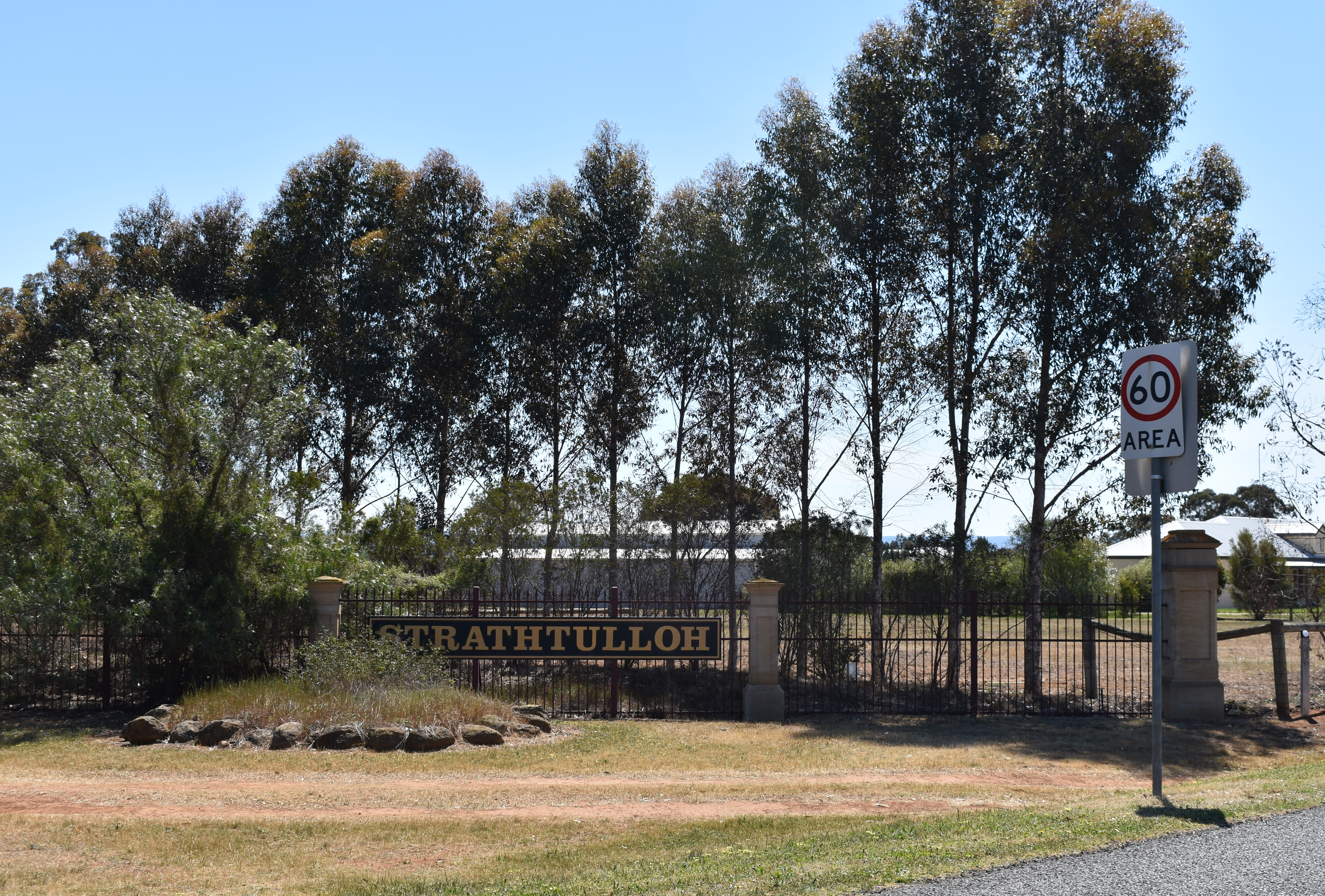
- A sign in front of the large lot subdivision, October 2018

- Interactive map of Strathtulloh
- Coordinates: 37°44′05″S 144°35′45″E
- Country: Australia
- State: Victoria
- City: Melbourne
- LGA: City of Melton
- Location: 33 km (21 mi) W of Melbourne; 9 km (5.6 mi) SE of Melton
- Established: 2017

Government
  - State electorate: Melton
  - Federal division: Hawke

Population
  - Total: 3,997 (2021 census)
- Postcode: 3338
Suburbs around Strathtulloh
Melton South	Cobblebank	Thornhill Park
Weir Views	Strathtulloh	Thornhill Park
Mount Cottrell	Mount Cottrell	Mount Cottrell

Strathtulloh is a suburb in Melbourne, Victoria, Australia, 33 km (21 mi) west of Melbourne's Central Business District, located within the City of Melton local government area. Strathtulloh recorded a population of 3,997 at the 2021 census.

The suburb was gazetted by the Office of Geographic Names on 9 February 2017, following a proposal for eleven new suburbs by the City of Melton. The new name officially came into effect on 23 August 2017.

Prior to the suburb's creation, the area was part of Melton South.

Strathtulloh is the name of a heritage-listed property in the suburb, located on Greigs Road.
