= Fieldstone, Victoria =

Fieldstone
- Suburb
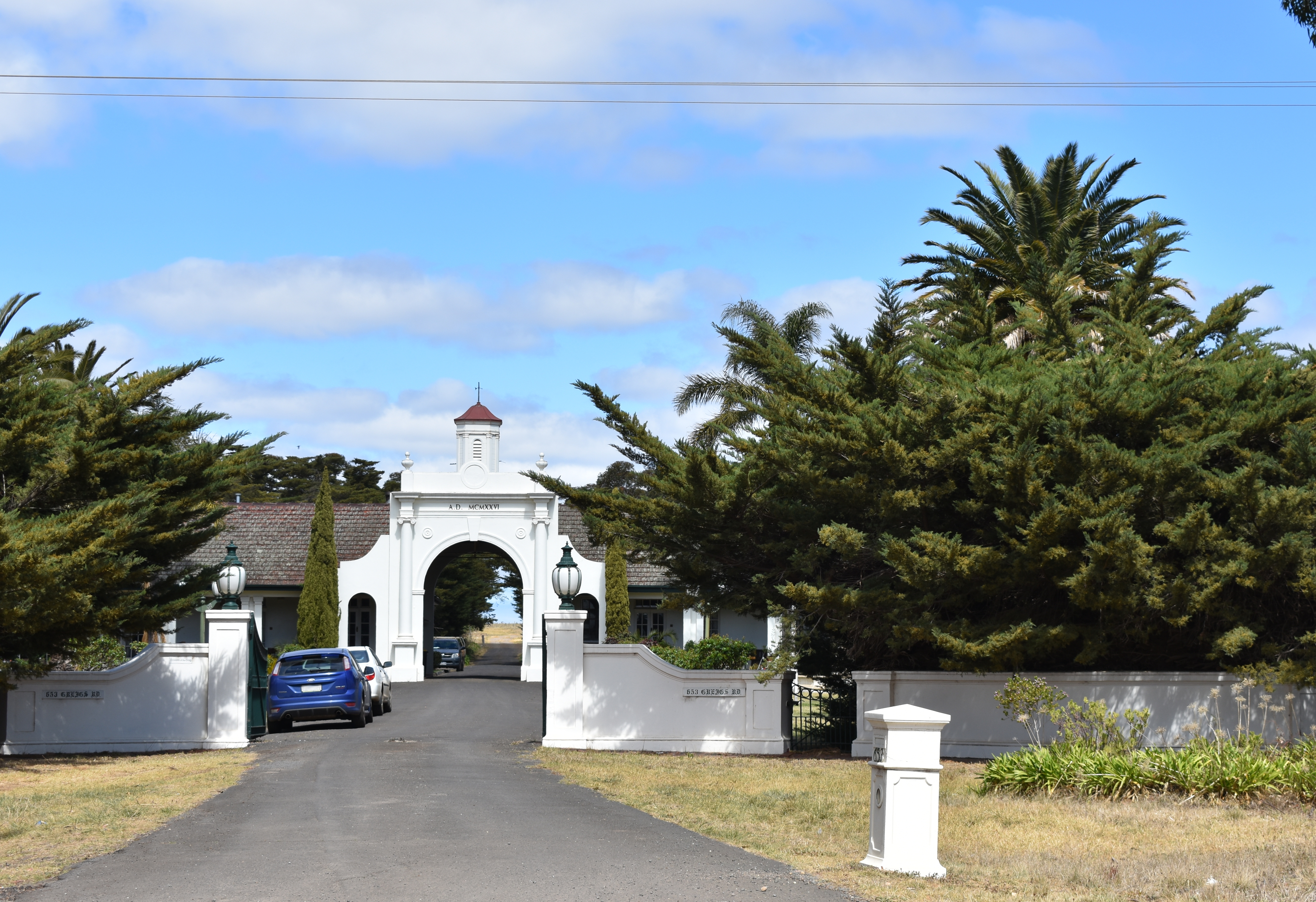
- The former Australian Beam Wireless Receiving Station at Fieldstone, October 2018

- Interactive map of Fieldstone
- Coordinates: 37°45′02″S 144°38′54″E
- Country: Australia
- State: Victoria
- City: Melbourne
- LGA: City of Melton
- Location: 28 km (17 mi) W of Melbourne; 9 km (5.6 mi) SE of Melton
- Established: 2017
- Postcode: 3024
Suburbs around Fieldstone
Thornhill Park	Rockbank	Rockbank
Thornhill Park	Fieldstone	Truganina
Mount Cottrell	Mount Cottrell	Truganina

Fieldstone is a suburb in Melbourne, Victoria, Australia, 28 km (17 mi) west of Melbourne's Central Business District, located within the City of Melton local government area.

The suburb was gazetted by the Office of Geographic Names on 9 February 2017, following a proposal for eleven new suburbs by the City of Melton. The new name officially came into effect in mid-2017.

Prior to the suburb's creation, the area was part of Mount Cottrell.
