= Werribee River Trail =

Australian leisure route

- Length: About 10km
- Location: Melbourne, Victoria, Australia
- Difficulty: Easy
- Hills: None
- Train: Werribee station
- Tram: None

The Werribee River Trail is a shared use path for cyclists and pedestrians, which follows Werribee River in the outer western suburb of Werribee in Melbourne, Victoria, Australia.

North of the Werribee train line the path runs both sides of the river. The path on the eastern side is longer by about 2.5 km.

The Werribee River Aqueduct project resulted in the construction of a footbridge in 2010 at the Federation Trail / Princes Freeway juncture, that allows riders to continue further south, following the west side of the Werribee River.

As part of the Werribee Regional Park development a second footbridge was also built in 2010 linking to the Werribee Park Mansion and Werribee Zoo.

== Connections ==
- dead end in the north at Riversdale Drive and Hope Way (east side of Davis Creek, near its junction with Werribee River), to be extended to Hogans Road.
- connects to the Federation Trail and Princes Freeway both at the Princes Freeway
- terminates in the south at Werribee Park Mansion.

North end at 37.867009°S 145.654223°E. South end at 37.918980°S 144.658795°E.
