= Ravenhall, Victoria =

Outer suburban locality of Melbourne, Victoria, Australia

Ravenhall
- Suburb
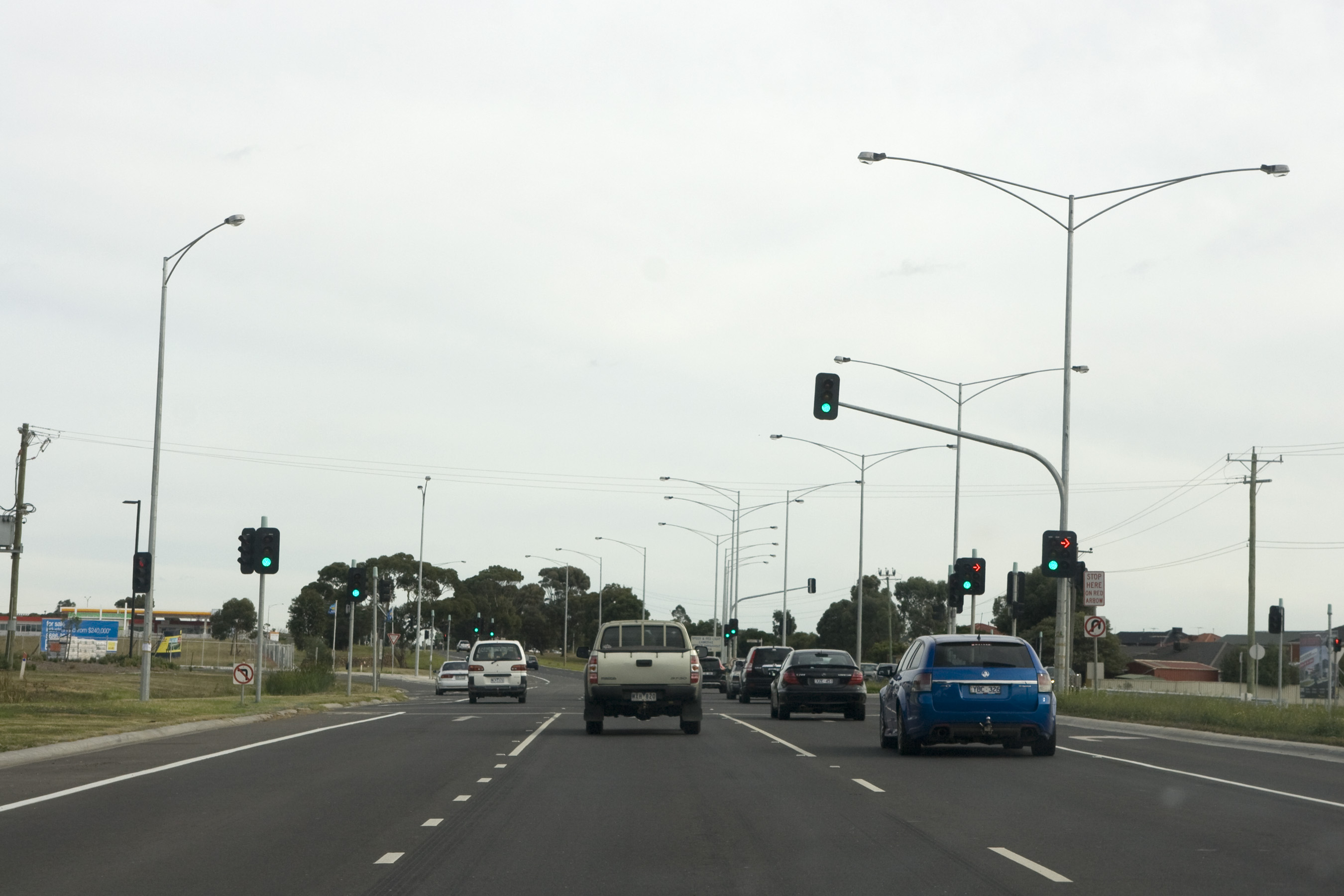
- Ballarat Road, Ravenhall

- Interactive map of Ravenhall
- Coordinates: 37.765°S 144.750°E
- Country: Australia
- State: Victoria
- City: Melbourne
- LGA: City of Melton
- Location: 20 km (12 mi) from Melbourne

Government
  - State electorate: Kororoit
  - Federal division: Gorton

Population
  - Total: 2,295 (2021 census)
- Postcode: 3023
Suburbs around Ravenhall
Deanside	Caroline Springs, Burnside	Deer Park
Truganina	Ravenhall	Deer Park, Derrimut
Truganina	Truganina	Derrimut

Ravenhall is a suburb in Melbourne, Victoria, Australia, 20 km (12 mi) west of Melbourne's Central Business District, located within the City of Melton local government area. Ravenhall recorded a population of 2,295 at the 2021 census.

An outer suburban locality that adjoins the Melbourne metropolitan area, Ravenhall is located south of the Western Freeway and the suburb of Caroline Springs. To the east, outside the City of Melton boundary is the Melbourne suburb of Deer Park. The locality is named after the Ravenhall Munitions Siding, established during World War II. Ravenhall siding was named after George E Ravenhall, a Commonwealth public servant of 46 years in the Defence Department, the Munitions Department and then executive officer of the dangerous cargoes movements section, Department of Supply and Shipping.

The nearest railway station to Ravenhall is Caroline Springs, located on Christies Road. As part of the Regional Rail Link project a bridge was built over the railway line on Christies Road to protect the nearby Boral Quarry from being isolated by the tracks. Part of the Regional Rail Link, which branches off from the Robinsons Road level crossing in Deer Park and forms the new section of the Geelong line, runs through Ravenhall.

The Metropolitan Remand Centre, a maximum security prison, is located in Ravenhall. Ravenhall Correctional Centre, a medium-security male prison, is also located in Ravenhall.

In June 2013, former Governor of the U.S. State of California and actor Arnold Schwarzenegger visited a 24-hour gym in Ravenhall, and was presented with the keys to the City of Melton by Mayor Kathy Majdlik.

== See also ==
- Melton, Victoria
