= Toolern Creek =

Coordinates: 37°44′05″S 144°34′46″E

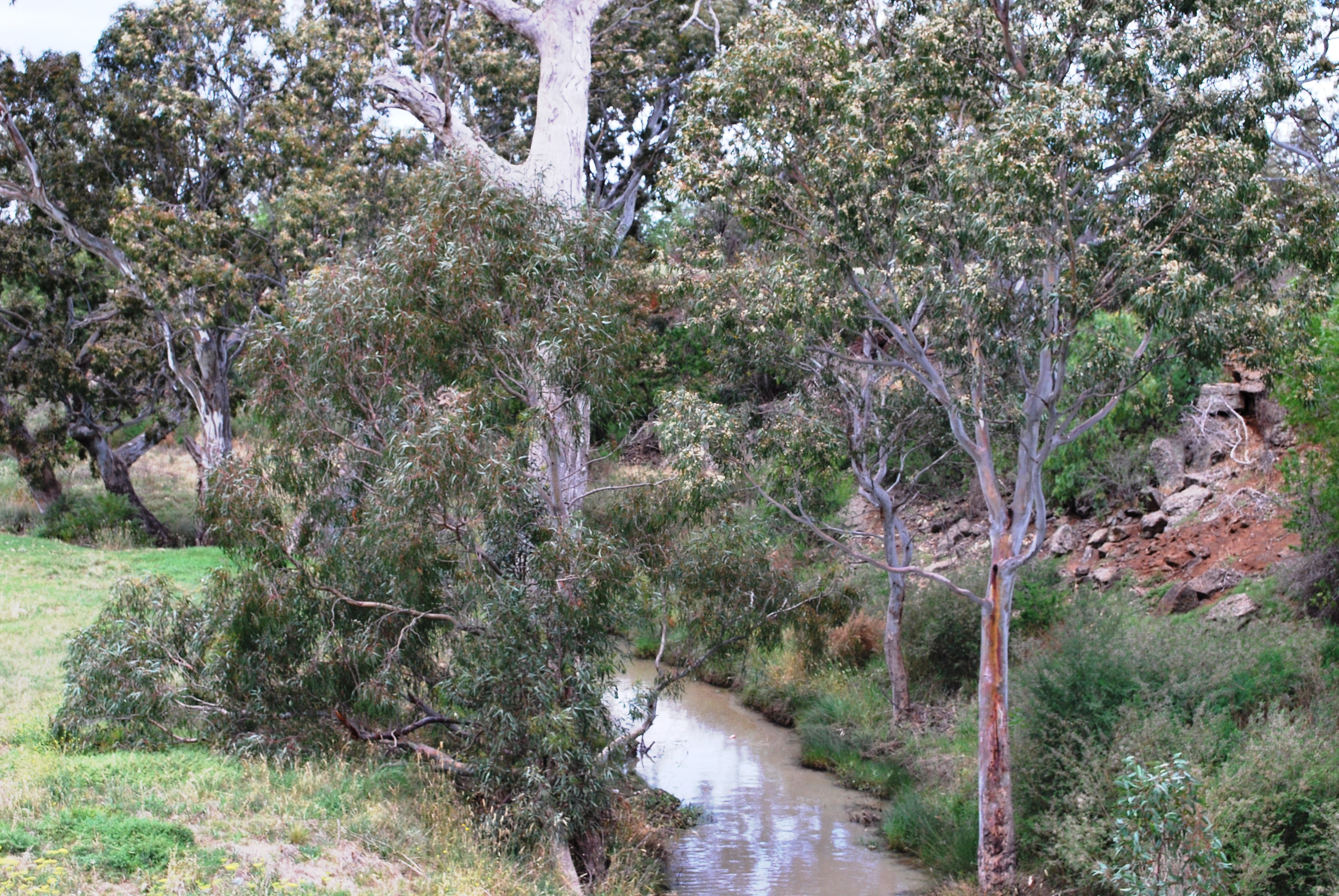
Toolern Creek at Bridge Road, Melton South, Victoria

Toolern Creek is a small tributary of the Werribee River in Victoria. The creek rises near Toolern Vale and flows through the Melbourne suburbs of Melton and Melton South, separating the industrial and residential areas of these suburbs.

The creek forms a confluence with the Werribee River at Exford immediately downstream from the Melton Reservoir.

A community group called Friends of Toolern Creek has been formed to preserve and restore the environment of the creek. The group holds an annual festival, the Toolern Creek Platypus Festival, to celebrate the platypus in the local waterways.

Residents in the Melton area can make use of the nearby Toolern Creek Trail.
