= George E Ravenhall =

- Born: 1886; Victoria
- Died: 1977 (aged 90–91)
- Occupation: Public servant
- Known for: Responsible for managing the storage and transportation of munitions during World War II

George E Ravenhall (1886–1977) was an Australian public servant who worked for 46 years, and who was responsible for managing the storage and transportation of munitions during World War II.

Born George Ernest Ravenhall in Victoria in about 1886, his parents were Alfred Ravenhall and Emily Woodbridge. He married Isabella Gertrude Dean (c1885-c1943), daughter of George Dean and Isabella Gertrude Wilson, in about 1913. They had two sons: George Dean Ravenhall and Ernest Creese Ravenhall (1917-c 1971).

Ravenhall began his career in the Commonwealth Public Service with the Defence Department, then moved to the Department of Munitions, and finally became Executive Officer of the Dangerous Cargoes Movements Section, Department of Supply and Shipping.

When the Second World War broke out in September 1939, Ravenhall was Controller of the Stores and Transport Directorate located on a nine-hectare site at the Government Ordnance Factory at Maribyrnong. Responsible for a staff of 30 and a fleet of 20 motor and horse-drawn vehicles, Ravenhall was considered the Cinderella of the department. In June 1940, the head office had been transferred to Cordite Avenue at Maribyrnong. The following year, Ravenhall was given responsibility for Defence Department transport operations across the country under a separate Transport Branch located at 83 William Street, Melbourne.

Ravenhall was appointed president of the Association of Charge Engineers in 1946.

Ravenhall was also closely involved in the North Melbourne Football Club for much of his adult life, serving as president in 1922 and being made a life member in 1950. He was also president of the Flemington Bowling Club in 1954 and Chairman of the VFL Umpires Appointment Board in 1943.

He died in 1977.

The locality of Ravenhall, Victoria, takes its name from the Ravenhall Munitions Siding, which was established during World War II and named after Ravenhall.
