= Toolern Creek Trail =

Multi-use trail in Melbourne, Australia

- Length: About 6.5km
- Location: Melbourne, Victoria, Australia
- Hills: None
- Train: Melton
- Tram: None

The Toolern Creek Trail is a shared use path for cyclists and pedestrians, which follows the Toolern Creek in the outer western suburb of Melton in Melbourne, Victoria, Australia.

== Connections ==
- North end at 37.668864°S 144.595360°E
- South end at 37.710734°S 144.579013°E
