= Staughton College =

Secondary school in Melbourne, Australia

Coordinates: 37°42′30″S 144°34′28″E

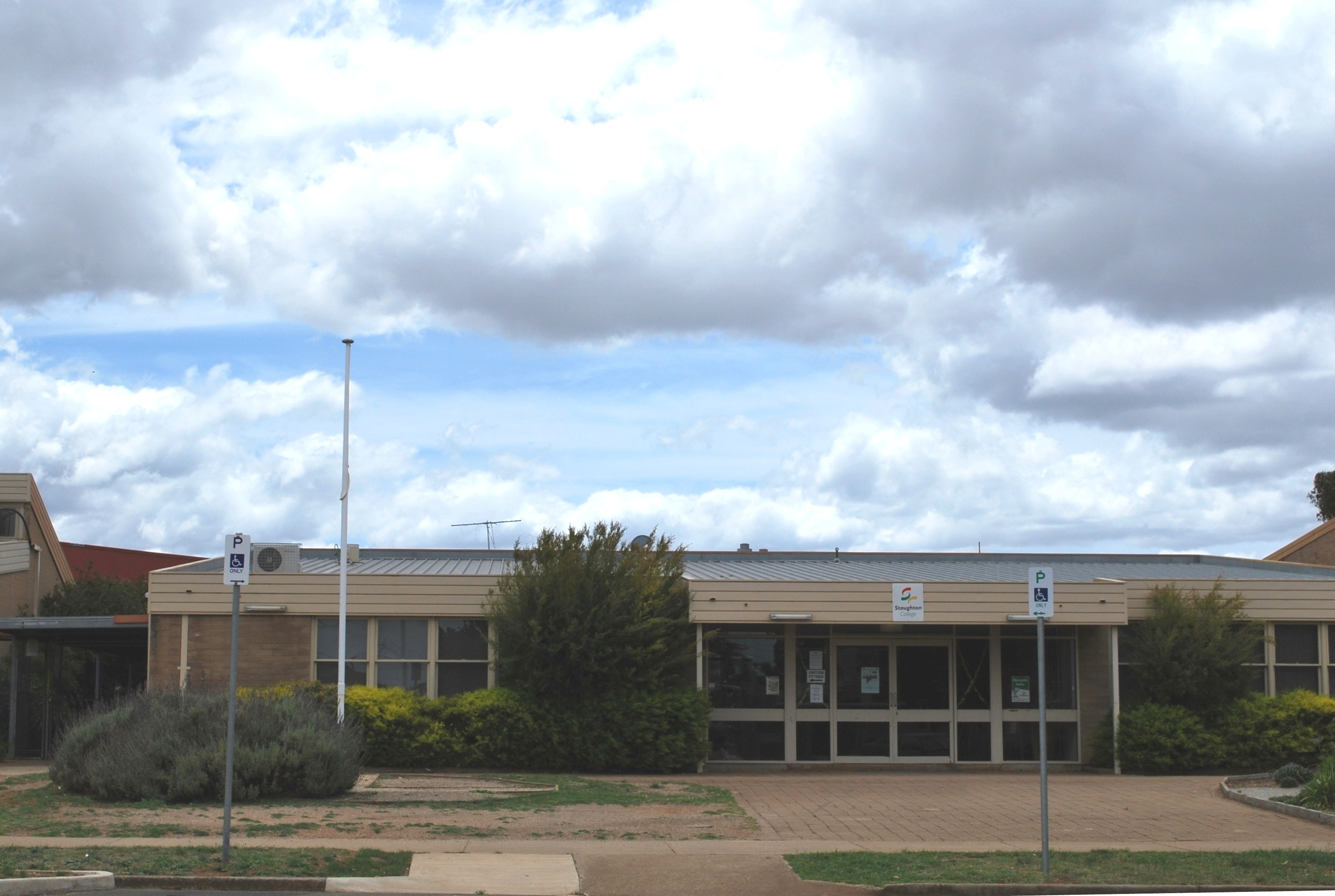
The school seen from Wilson Road

Staughton College is a secondary school in Melton South, Melbourne, Australia. It was established as Melton South Technical School in 1979 focusing on technical education. The school was transformed into Secondary College following Victorian education reforms that reorganized the structure of state schools from into colleges. The college was called Wilson Park Secondary College.

The school is located on Wilson Road in Melton South next to the Melton South Campus of Victoria University, Australia.

== The school ==
The school retains a little of its technical college past but has facilities for education in technology such as woodworking, electronics, robotics, and foods. The school has an extensive music program and offers subjects over a range of disciplines with a strong academic focus at all levels. The school community changed its name to Staughton College in the very early 2000s. The school is named after Simon Staughton an early pioneer within the Exford district of Melton.

As of 2024, the school has a total enrolment of around 1600 students.

The school has seen in recent years a strong demand for places for students and is continuing to grow rapidly. A number of students have gone on to tertiary education at prestigious universities within Melbourne.

Since the transformation of the education system under the government of Steve Bracks the school has introduced VCAL and VET units alongside the Victorian Certificate of Education. These developments have enabled students to learn a range of skills to prepare them to enter the workforce.

The school has been classified as underrepresented in the tertiary sector for quite a while in relation to Victorian Universities Special Access and Entry Scheme. So students who apply for tertiary study through VTAC.
