= Mount Cottrell =

- Town
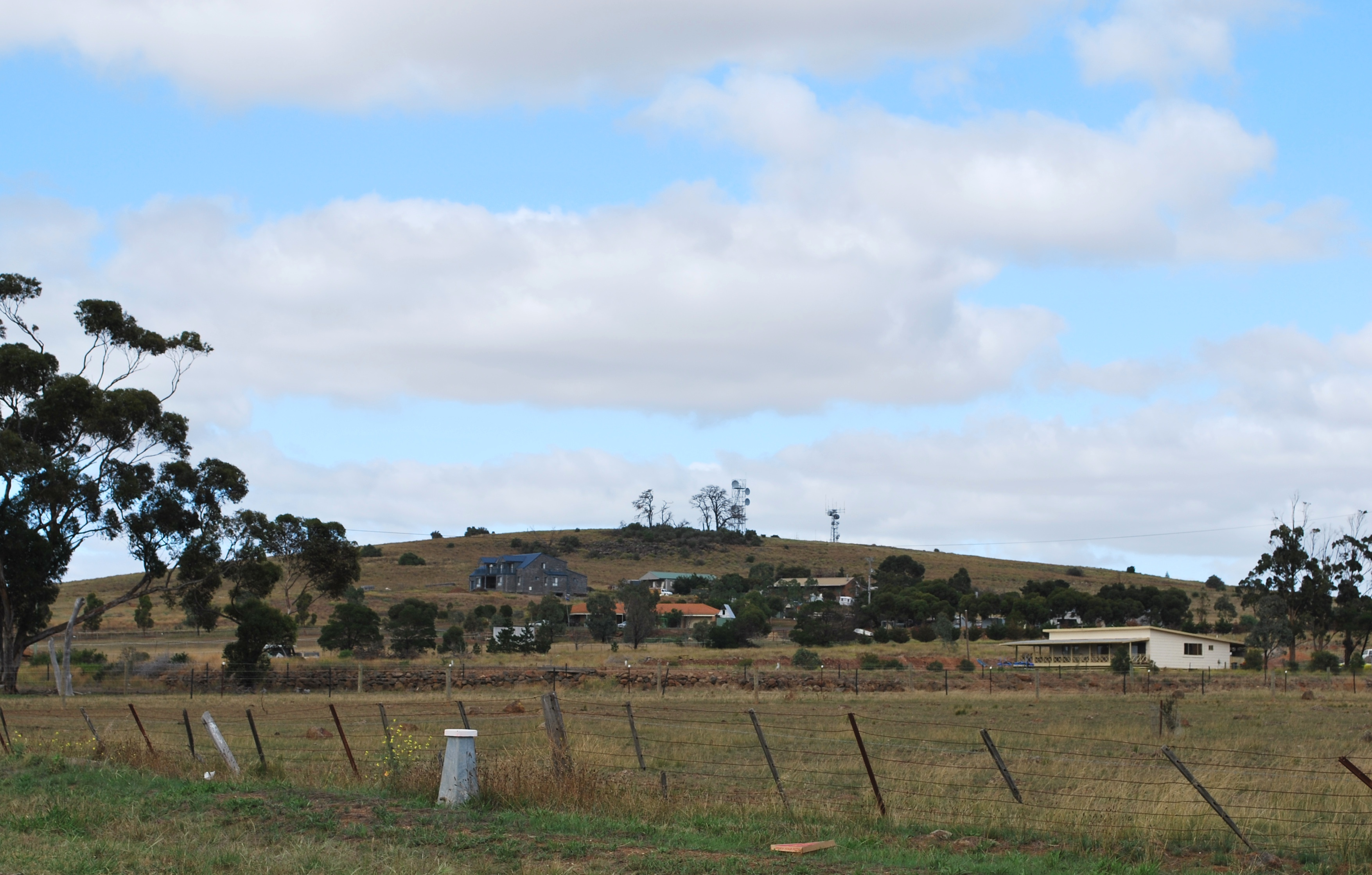
- Mount Cottrell

- Interactive map of Mount Cottrell
- Coordinates: 37°46′26″S 144°37′52″E
- Country: Australia
- State: Victoria
- City: Melbourne
- LGAs: City of Melton; City of Wyndham
- Location: 31 km (19 mi) from Melbourne; 11 km (6.8 mi) from Melton

Government
  - State electorates: Kororoit; Tarneit
  - Federal divisions: Gorton; Hawke; Lalor
- Elevation: 34 m (112 ft)

Population
  - Total: 496 (2021 census)
- Postcode: 3024
Localities around Mount Cottrell
Weir Views, Exford	Strathtulloh, Thornhill Park	Fieldstone, Truganina
Eynesbury	Mount Cottrell	Truganina
Eynesbury	Wyndham Vale, Tarneit	Tarneit

Mount Cottrell is a locality in Victoria, Australia, 31 km (19 mi) west of Melbourne's Central Business District, straddling the local government areas of Melton and Wyndham. Mount Cottrell recorded a population of 496 at the 2021 census.

== Geography ==
The locality of Mount Cottrell consists of mainly privately owned open land. It is named after the 203m high mountain it encompasses, Mount Cottrell, the most massive of the Werribee Plains volcanoes, a volcanic cone formed by the radial eruption of numerous lava tongues. The mountain was purchased by Melton Council in 2007 to preserve the significant geological and flora and fauna values on the site.

== History ==
The locality is named after Anthony Cottrell, a member of the Port Phillip association who was allotted the land by the company in about 1835–36. The original "No.10" hut was located about 1.5 km north of the Mount Cottrell summit.

Mount Cottrell Post Office opened on 1 January 1866, closed in 1895, reopened in 1902 and closed again in 1958.

=== Mount Cottrell massacre ===
The Mount Cottrell massacre was a reprisal killing for squatter Charles Franks and his convict shepherd Thomas Flinders by Aboriginal people. Around 10 Wathaurong people were murdered at Mt Cottrell by 17 settlers armed with muskets on 16 July 1836.

=== Residential development ===
The first residential subdivision in the area, Chartwell Estate, was established in 1957 on the corner of Boundary Road and Downing Street. Blocks were sold sight unseen to English migrants, and in a bid to attract them, the estate was named after Chartwell (Winston Churchill's country house) and streets were given distinctly English names. Only a handful of houses were ever built, due to the remote location and lack of basic infrastructure.

Much of the southern section of Mount Cottrell lies within Melbourne's urban growth boundary and is zoned for urban growth. Residential development of the locality began in the early 2020s, with the area between Leakes Road and the Regional Rail Link the first to be built up.
