= Burnside Heights =

- Suburb
- Interactive map of Burnside Heights
- Coordinates: 37.727°S 144.760°E
- Country: Australia
- State: Victoria
- City: Melbourne
- LGA: City of Melton
- Location: 21 km (13 mi) NW of Melbourne
- Established: 1990s

Government
  - State electorate: Kororoit
  - Federal division: Gorton

Population
  - Total: 6,377 (2021 census)
- Postcode: 3023
Suburbs around Burnside Heights
Taylors Hill	Taylors Hill	Delahey
Caroline Springs	Burnside Heights	Kings Park
Caroline Springs	Burnside	Albanvale

Burnside Heights is a suburb in Melbourne, Victoria, Australia, 21 km (13 mi) north-west of Melbourne's Central Business District, located within the City of Melton local government area. Burnside Heights recorded a population of 6,377 at the 2021 census.

Burnside Heights is separated from the suburb of Burnside to the south by Kororoit Creek and Caroline Springs.

Burnside Heights, although a young suburb, is well established, with nearby schools, medical centres, a kindergarten, a gymnasium and an AFL and cricket oval. Burnside Heights has several large shopping centres in close proximity, including Watergardens and Brimbank Central. Its major draw card is its close proximity (500m) to the Caroline Springs town square, which is a major activity centre for the area. In December 2010 the Watervale Shopping Centre was established within the suburb.

Burnside Heights was developed from the creations of three developers under the names of VicUrban (Tenterfield), Triton Property Group (Taylors Park Estate) and Sunlands (Arbour on the Park). Burnside Heights was renamed from Burnside when the developers at the time sought to distinguish from the older part.

== Transport ==
Railway stations closest to Burnside Heights are the Keilor Plains and Watergardens railway stations, both on the Sunbury line, and the newly created Caroline Springs railway station, on the Ballarat line, which are 4 minutes and 8 minutes driving distance respectively.

== See also ==
- Kororoit Creek Trail
