= Ballarat Road =

Road in Melbourne, Victoria

Ballarat Road Victoria
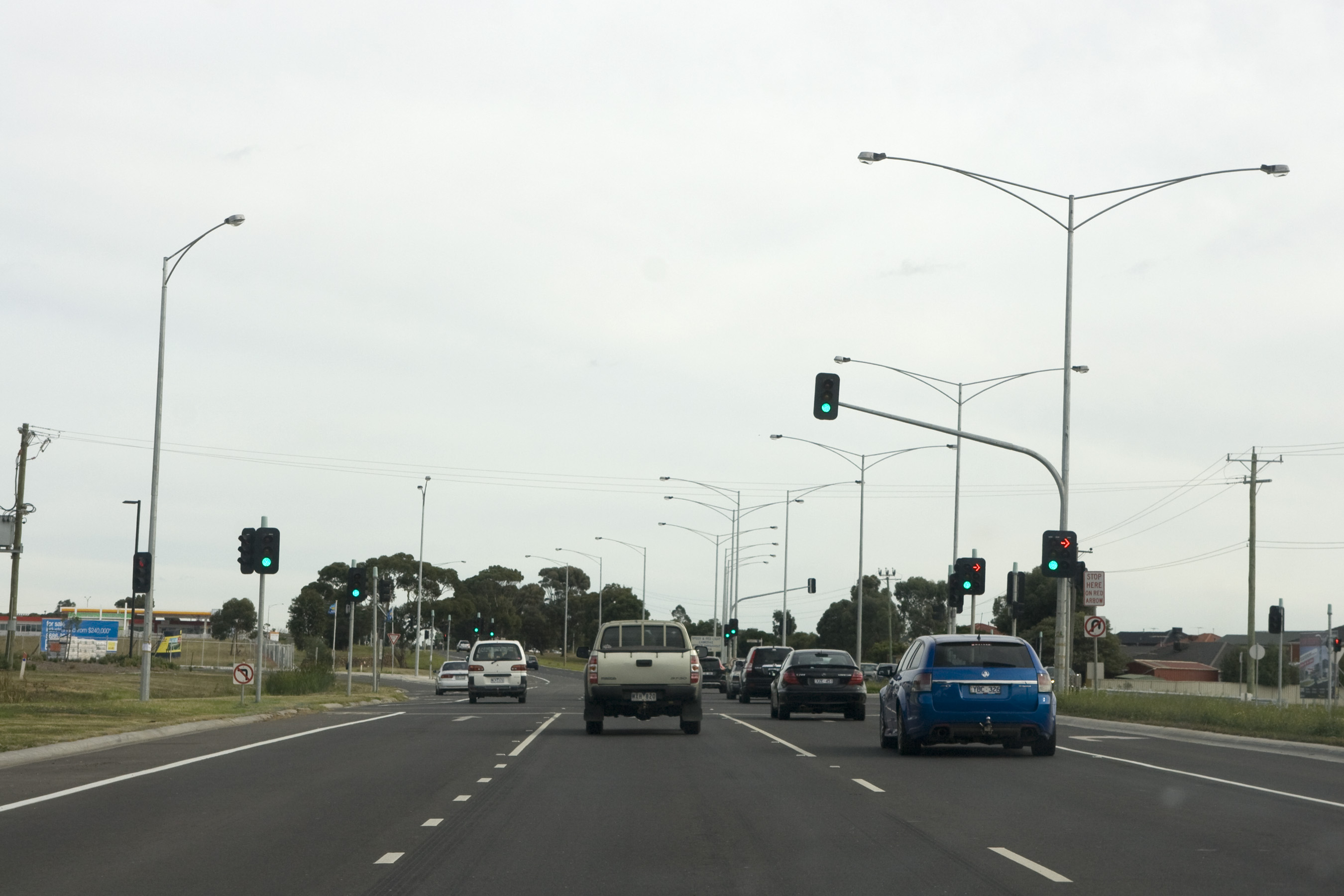
- Ballarat Road, Ravenhall
- Coordinates: 37.753196°S 144.730886°E (West end); 37.795078°S 144.912801°E (East end)

General information
- Type: Road
- Length: 17 km (11 mi)
- Gazetted: December 1913 (as Main Road); July 1925 (as State Highway)
- Route number(s): Metro Route 8 (2009–present) (Ravenhall–Footscray); Metro Route 83 (1989–present) (through Footscray)
- Former route number: National Highway M8 (1997–2009); National Highway 8 (1974–1997) (Ravenhall–Ardeer); National Highway 8 (1974–2009) (Ardeer–Footscray); National Route 8 (1955–1974) Entire route; Alt National Route 1 (1978–1989); National Route 1 (1955–1978) (through Footscray)

Major junctions
- West end: Western Freeway; Ravenhall, Melbourne
- Western Ring Road; Geelong Road
- East end: Smithfield Road; Footscray, Melbourne

Location(s)
- Major suburbs: Caroline Springs, Deer Park, Albion, Sunshine, Braybrook

Ballarat Road is a major urban arterial road in the western suburbs of Melbourne, Victoria, Australia.

== Route ==
Ballarat Road commences at the interchange with Western Freeway at Ravenhall and continues in a south-easterly direction as a four-lane, dual-carriageway road through the suburbs of Deer Park, where it meets with Western Ring Road in Ardeer. It continues in an easterly direction to Maidstone, where it narrows to a four-lane, single carriageway road, and continues in a south-easterly direction to Footscray, where it widens again to a dual-carriageway road at the intersection with Geelong Road. It continues east before crossing the Maribyrnong River over Lynchs Bridge, where it changes name to Smithfield Road (and continues onto Flemington). VicRoads' declaration states Ballarat Road ends at the intersection with Geelong Road, however signposts still indicate the road ends at Lynch's Bridge across the Maribyrnong.

== History ==
The passing of the Country Roads Act 1912 through the Parliament of Victoria provided for the establishment of the Country Roads Board (later VicRoads) and their ability to declare Main Roads, taking responsibility for the management, construction and care of the state's major roads from local municipalities. (Main) Ballarat Road, from Melton via Braybrook to Melton, was declared a Main Road on 30 December 1913.

The passing of the Highways and Vehicles Act 1924 provided for the declaration of State Highways, roads two-thirds financed by the state government through the Country Roads Board. Western Highway was declared a State Highway on 1 July 1925,cobbled from a collection of roads from Melbourne through to Ballarat, subsuming the original declaration of Main Ballarat Road as a Main Road.

The Whitlam government introduced the federal National Roads Act 1974, where roads declared as a National Highway were still the responsibility of the states for road construction and maintenance, but were fully compensated by the federal government for money spent on approved projects. As an important interstate link between the capitals of Victoria and South Australia, Western Highway was declared a National Highway in 1974.

This section of the road was eventually bypassed as the main route through western Melbourne when Deer Park bypass opened in 2009, with the road name devolving back to its original identity as Ballarat Road as a consequence; the route is still co-signed as Western Highway on older signs however.

As part of Western Highway, the road was signed as National Route 8 in 1955, then as National Highway 8 when upgraded to a National Highway in 1974. With Victoria's conversion to the newer alphanumeric system in the late 1990s, the section between Ravenhall and Ardeer (where it met the Western Ring Road) was upgraded to National Highway M8; it was left as National Highway 8 east of the ring road along its original alignment into central Melbourne. Once the Deer Park bypass was opened in 2009 and National Route M8 was re-routed onto the new bypass, the old route was replaced with Metropolitan Route 8 from Ravenhall to the inner suburb of Footscray.

The passing of the Road Management Act 2004 granted the responsibility of overall management and development of Victoria's major arterial roads to VicRoads: in 2004, VicRoads declared this road as Footscray-Caroline Springs Road (Arterial #5520), beginning in Footscray and ending in Ravenhall; the road is still presently known (and signposted) as Ballarat Road.

== Transport ==
Tram route 82 runs along the Footscray section of Ballarat Road, between Gordon & Droop Streets. The Serviceton railway line from Southern Cross runs parallel to Ballarat Road from Sunshine about 1 km to the south, with stations at Albion, and Deer Park. Several bus routes run along Ballarat Road at various points (routes 215, 216, 220, 223, 256, 400, 406, 408, 410 and 456) with 456 continuing on the Western Freeway to Melton.

With three lanes running in each direction, between Deer Park and the Western Ring Road, this was one of the worst bottlenecks in western Melbourne with traffic reaching 70,000 vehicles per day, with 10 per cent of this consisting of heavy vehicles. This caused delays, in part due to seven traffic signals between the Western Ring Road and the start of the Western Freeway. With the completion of the Deer Park Bypass traffic volumes were predicted to decrease to local traffic standard since its opening on 5 April 2009.

In central Melbourne, Ballarat Road has a single carriageway from Braybrook and is a two lane arterial road, including one small stretch which shares the road with trams.

== Major intersections and suburbs ==
LGA	Location	km	mi	Destinations	Notes
Melton	Ravenhall	0.0	0.0	Western Freeway (M8 west) – Melton, Ballarat, Horsham, Adelaide	Westbound exit and eastbound entrance ramps only Western terminus of Metro Route 8
Melton	Ravenhall–Caroline Springs boundary	0.9	0.56	Caroline Springs Boulevard (north) – Caroline Springs; Christies Road (south), to Western Freeway (M8 east) – City	
Melton	Ravenhall–Burnside boundary	2.4	1.5	Westwood Drive – Hoppers Crossing, Burnside	
Brimbank	Deer Park	4.4	2.7	Station Road (Metro Route 40) – Laverton, Taylors Lakes	
Kororoit Creek		5.4	3.4	Bridge over river (bridge name unknown)	
Brimbank	Deer Park–Ardeer–Cairnlea tripoint	6.2	3.9	Western Ring Road (M80 northeast, M80/Tourist Drive 21 southwest) – Geelong, Adelaide, Seymour, Sydney	
Brimbank	Albion	8.9	5.5	Bendigo railway line	
Brimbank	Sunshine	9.3	5.8	St Albans Road (northwest) – St Albans; McIntyre Road (Metro Route 41 north) – Taylors Lakes, Keilor Downs; Anderson Road (Metro Route 41 south) – Sunshine, Brooklyn	
Brimbank	Sunshine–Sunshine North–Braybrook tripoint	11.0	6.8	Duke Street – Braybrook, Sunshine North	
Maribyrnong	Braybrook	12.6	7.8	Ashley Street – Tottenham, Yarraville	
Maribyrnong	Maidstone	12.9	8.0	Churchill Avenue (Metro Routes 38/39) – Braybrook, Maribyrnong	
Maribyrnong	Maidstone–Footscray boundary	14.3	8.9	Rosamond Road (north) – Maribyrnong; Summerhill Road (south) – West Footscray	
Maribyrnong	Footscray	15.0	9.3	Gordon Street (Metro Route 37) – Williamstown, Essendon	
Maribyrnong	Footscray	15.3	9.5	Droop Street – Footscray	
Maribyrnong	Footscray	15.4	9.6	Farnsworth Avenue – Ascot Vale	
Maribyrnong	Footscray	16.0	9.9	Geelong Road (Metro Route 83) – Werribee, Geelong	Eastern terminus of Metro Route 8, Metro Route 83 continues southwest along Geelong Road
Maribyrnong	Footscray	16.5	10.3	Moore Street (Metro Route 35) – Footscray	Western terminus of concurrency with Metro Route 35
Maribyrnong River		17.3	10.7	Lynchs Bridge	
Melbourne	Flemington	17.3	10.7	Smithfield Road (Metro Routes 35/83) – Flemington, City	Metro Routes 35/83 continue east along Smithfield Road; Eastern terminus of concurrency with Metro Route 35
Concurrency terminus; Incomplete access; Route transition

== See also ==
- Western Highway
