= Kororoit Creek Trail =

Cycling and pedestrian trail in Melbourne, Australia

Kororoit Creek
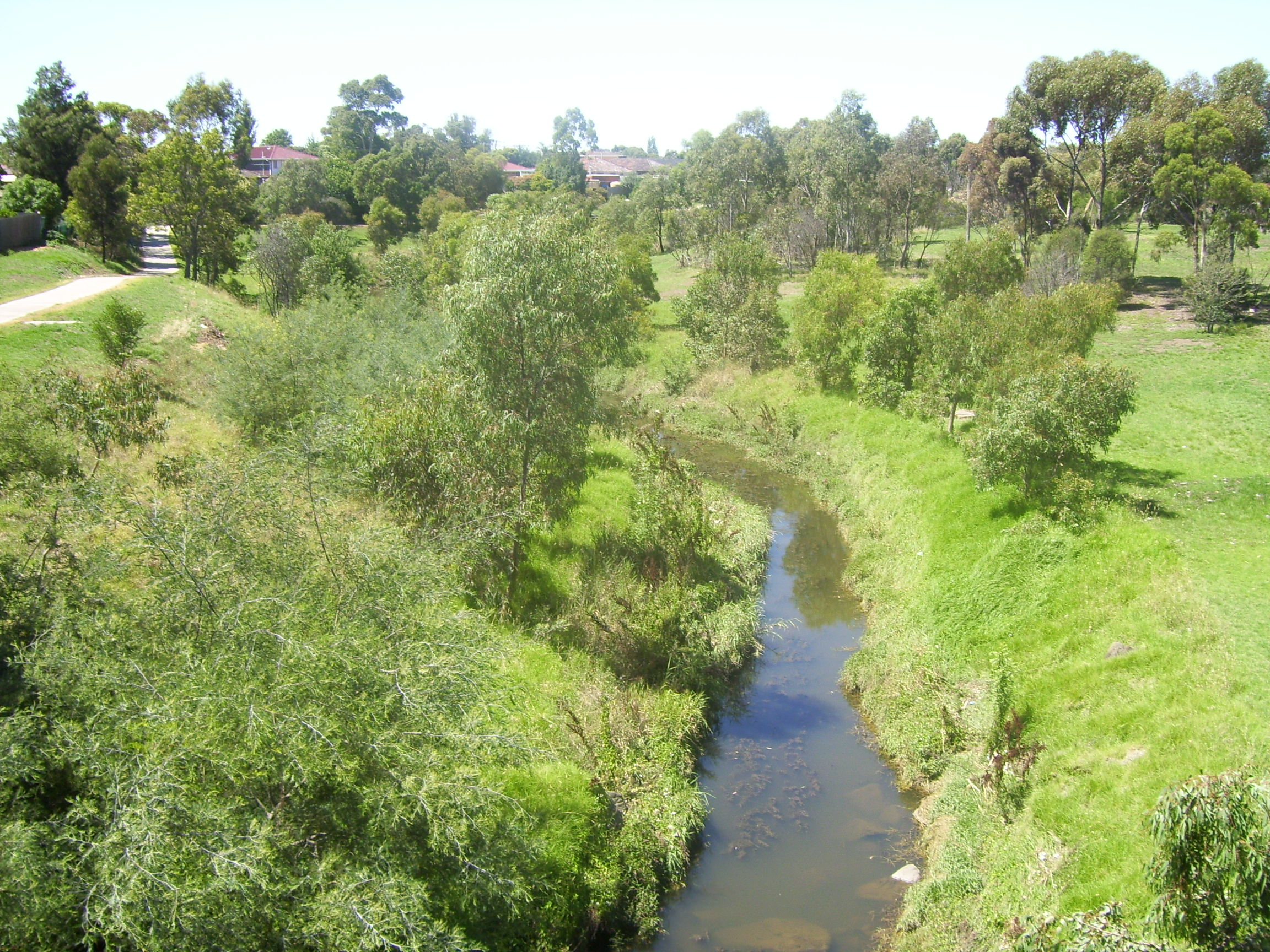
- Kororoit Creek Trail along Kororoit Creek
- Length: Upper & middle sections: ~10km, lower section: ~3km
- Location: City of Brimbank, Melbourne, Victoria, Australia 3021
- Difficulty: Easy
- Hills: None
- Trains: Albion station, Sunshine station, Seaholme station

The Kororoit Creek Trail is a shared use path for cyclists and pedestrians, which follows the Kororoit Creek in the inner western suburbs of Melbourne, Victoria, Australia.

The interrupted upper section is located in Burnside and Deer Park, the uninterrupted middle section starts in Ardeer and proceeds to Brooklyn, while the lower section is located in Altona.

== Following the trail ==
=== Upper section (interrupted) ===
The trail starts in Caroline Springs, on to Burnside continuing through to Albanvale and then Deer Park (approx 10 km).

The trail starts as a concrete path in Caroline Springs, where Caroline Springs Boulevarde crosses the creek. Some 2 km later use the road section from Westwood Drive to Bilungah Place. This leads to a gravel section and a ford to access the east side of the creek. A 1 km concrete path leads to a small footbridge near the Deer Park Secondary College at Deer Park. If the ford is flooded, a nearby road route can be used to access this footbridge instead.

Navigation is then straightforward with sealed concrete paths on both sides of the creek arriving at Station Road (approx 800 m).

After an easy road crossing at Station Road the path continues on the south bank along Gurnung Drv and crosses to the north bank, then through Cairnlea to Cairnlea Drive (approx 700m). From here pedestrians cross the Western Highway and then proceed east to Moore Park in Ardeer (approx 400 m) to the Western Ring Road Trail.

=== Middle section (uninterrupted) ===
The trail then runs directly and uninterrupted from Moore Park, Ardeer to Albion, then Sunshine and onto Brooklyn (approx 4 km). The trail passes close to both Albion and Sunshine stations and also has easy access to the Western Ring Road Trail at Moore Park and onwards to the Federation Trail in Brooklyn. As of 2013 the trail ends at this intersection with the Federation Trail.

=== Lower section ===
In July 2017 a new section of the Trail, connecting Grieve Parade to Barnes Road, was opened. This section is augmented along its length with sculptures created by Geoffrey Ricardo: "A strange trail of beasts, spirits and guardians". The one kilometre link from Grieve Parade to the Federation Trail was opened in April 2024 as part of the West Gate Tunnel works.

=== Lowest section ===
The Hobsons Bay Coastal Trail goes through Altona Coastal Park - site of the old Williamstown Racecourse. A lone palm stands guard over the remains of the old grandstand. North of the park, at the ford over Racecourse Road and also at the south end of the park, trails split off that lead to a single path, that heads westerly towards Millers Road. Nearby was the old Williamstown Racecourse railway station.

At Millers Rd cross the road to the serenity of Cherry Lake. A 3.7 km path circumnavigates the lake. On the way bird life including pelicans can be seen. It makes for stark contrast in this heavily industrialised area.

== Future expansion ==
The section from Barnes Road to Cherry Lake is still incomplete as at May 2024. Once the upper and lower paths are joined, there will be an uninterrupted walking and cycling path all the way from Ardeer to Port Phillip Bay. Cycling and walking options exist along Millers Road northwards from Cherry Lake, up to the junction with Cabot Road and through Miller's Junction Shopping Complex to Barnes Road.

== Connections to other bike paths ==
The northern end of the upper section connects to Western Ring Road Trail. The southern end of the upper section connects to the Federation Trail.

The northern end of the lower section is a dead end at Cherry Lake. The southern end of the lower section connects to Hobsons Bay Coastal Trail.

Upper: North end at 37.738450°S 144.738725°E. South end at 37.820712°S 144.824784°E.
Lower: North end at 37.858104°S 144.826533°E. South end at 37.858477°S 144.850282°E.
