= Albion, Victoria =

Albion
- Suburb
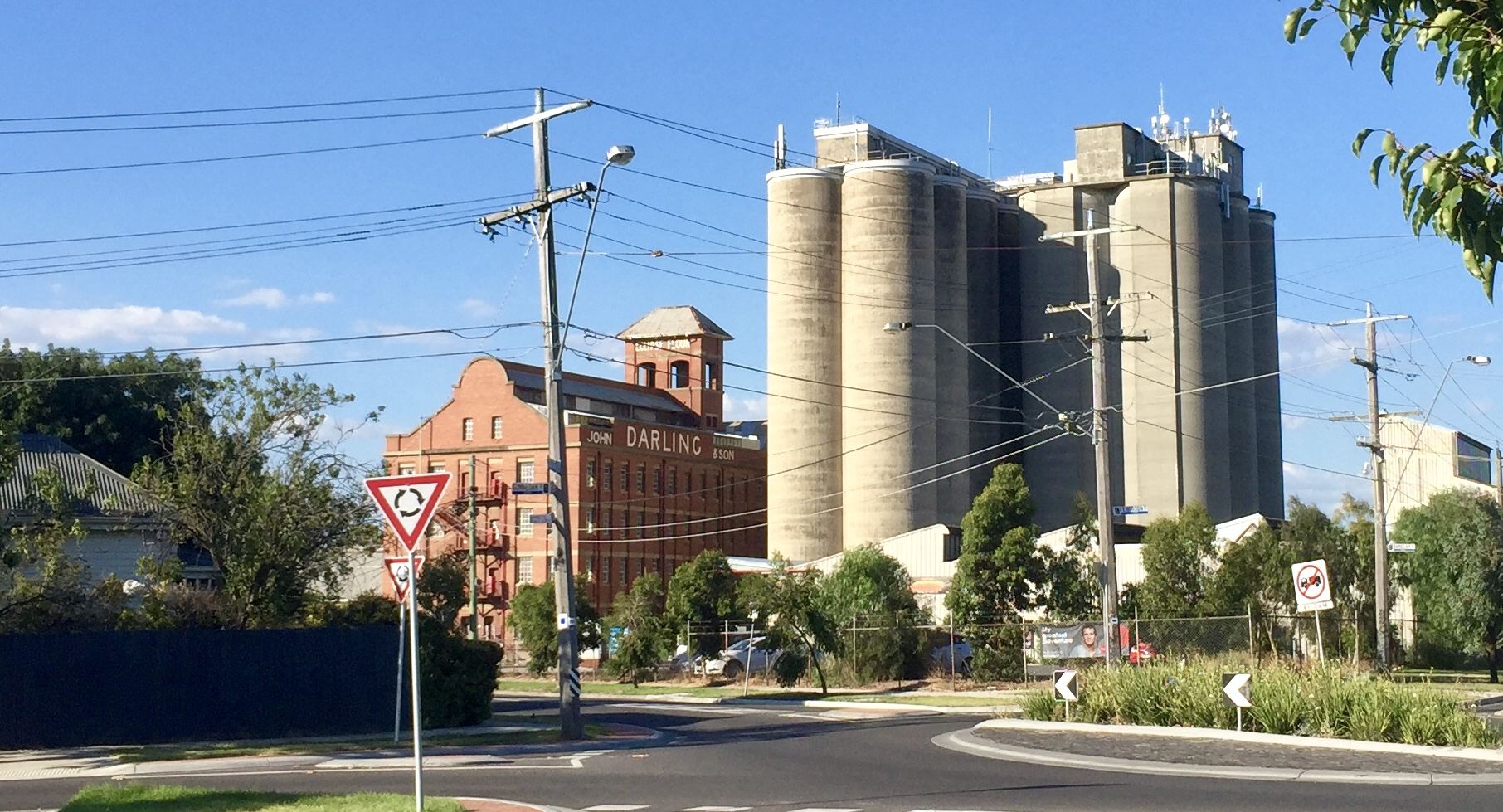
- The John Darling & Son flour mill

- Interactive map of Albion
- Coordinates: 37°46′52″S 144°48′52″E
- Country: Australia
- State: Victoria
- City: Melbourne
- LGA: City of Brimbank
- Location: 14 km (8.7 mi) from Melbourne
- Established: 1849

Government
  - State electorates: St Albans; Laverton
  - Federal division: Fraser

Area
  - Total: 2.5 km^{2} (0.97 sq mi)
- Elevation: 43 m (141 ft)

Population
  - Total: 4,334 (2021 census)
  - Density: 1,730/km^{2} (4,490/sq mi)
- Postcode: 3020
Suburbs around Albion
Sunshine North	Sunshine North	Sunshine North
Ardeer	Albion	Sunshine
Sunshine West	Sunshine West	Sunshine

Albion is a suburb in Melbourne, Victoria, Australia, 14 km (8.7 mi) west of Melbourne's Central Business District, located within the City of Brimbank local government area. Albion recorded a population of 4,334 at the 2021 census.

Albion is bordered on the north by Ballarat Road, the south by Forrest Street, the west by Kororoit Creek and the east by Anderson Road. The suburb is completely surrounded by other parts of Sunshine except for Ardeer, which lies to Albion's due west across Kororoit Creek.

== History ==
The area was originally called Darlington, from at least 1860 to about 1890. The area originally known as Albion was directly west of Duke Street, as can be noted by the many streets there named after English counties and placenames – Albion being an ancient name for the island of Great Britain.

Albion station opened on 5 January 1860 as Albion and Darlington but closed a year later. It was not until 1919 that a new station was opened on the same site with the name Albion station.

In March 1885 the Albion Quarrying Company began its operations in the area. The disused Albion quarry, accessed from Hulett Street in Albion, was the location for AC/DC's Jailbreak music video.

It was H. V. McKay of Sunshine Harvester Works fame who bought land to develop a residential community for his workers in first decades on the 20th century. His concept for Sunshine was the Sunshine Estate: a community designed with superficial similarities to garden cities of the early 20th century. This area was mainly in what is now called Albion. McKay's own residence, The Gables, was in Talmage Street (where the cul-de-sac The Gables now is) until it was consumed by fire and subsequently demolished.

=== Heritage listing ===
The following place in Albion is listed on the Victorian Heritage Register:

- John Darling and Son Flour Mill, 74 Sydney Street. The notable red brick landmark was built in 1922, to the south of Ballarat Road, next to Albion station.

== Today ==
Albion has many period homes such as California bungalows and 1940s weatherboard houses. In the eastern parts of Albion, many of the oldest homes were built by H. V. McKay as part of his Sunshine Estate, a housing community built according to the influential early 20th Century Garden city movement.

Kororoit Creek provides the western border for Albion. Along it runs the Kororoit Creek Trail which runs all the way southwards to meet the Federation Trail in Brooklyn.

Stony Creek lies on the eastern edge of Albion, close to Anderson Road. As of 2013, the creek's environmental state west of Anderson Road is very poor as it has long been converted to nothing more than a concrete stormwater drain for this particular section of its course.

== Transport ==
Albion railway station is on the Sunbury line and lies in the Public Transport Victoria zones 1+2 overlap.

Metropolitan buses service the suburb and Albion station. These include:

- 215 Caroline Springs – Highpoint Shopping Centre via Albion station, Burnside Shopping Centre (every day). Operated by Kinetic Melbourne.
- 400 Sunshine – Laverton via Deer Park station, Dame Phyllis Frost Centre, Metropolitan Remand Centre, and Port Phillip Prison (every day). Operated by Transit Systems Victoria and CDC Melbourne.
- 422 Sunshine – Brimbank Shopping Centre via Deer Park station (every day). Operated by Transit Systems Victoria.
- 426 Caroline Springs – Sunshine via Ballarat Road. Operated by Kinetic Melbourne.
- 456 Sunshine – Woodgrove Shopping Centre (Melton) via Albion station, Burnside Shopping Centre, Caroline Springs, Melton (every day). Operated by Transit Systems Victoria.

Cyclists in Albion are represented by BrimBUG, the Brimbank Bicycle User Group. The Kororoit Creek Trail runs along Albion's western perimeter.

== Facilities ==
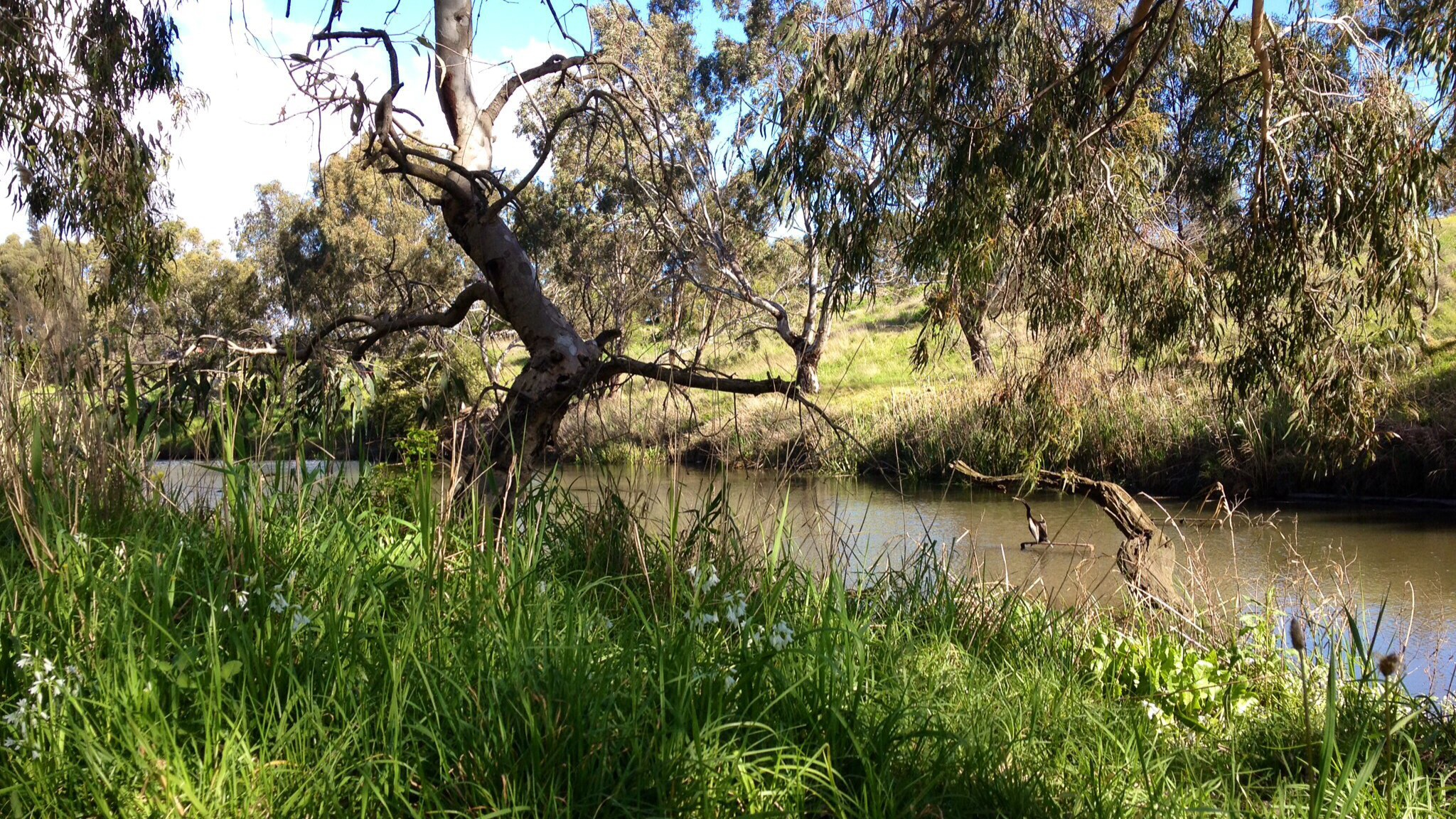
Kororoit Creek near Selwyn Park in Albion.

=== Education ===
- Albion Primary School
- St Theresa's Catholic Primary School
- Albion Kindergarten

=== Sports ===
The Western Eagles are the local soccer team. Formed in 1950 by Polish immigrants as KS Polonia, the club has been champions of Victoria on 3 occasions. They currently compete in the Victorian State League Division 2 N/W, the 5th tier of the Victorian soccer pyramid.

Other sports clubs include:

- Albion Thunder FC
- Community Soccer Hub
- Sunshine Baseball Club
- Sunshine Bowls Club
- Polish Recreation & Sports Centre
- Sunshine United Cricket Club
- Ace GoKarts
- Albion Tennis Club
- Westside Gymnastics

=== Religious sites ===
- St Theresa's Catholic Church
- Slovak Baptist Church
- Assemblies of God Church
- Yen Ming Tang Buddhist Meditation Centre

== See also ==
- City of Sunshine – Albion was previously within this former local government area.
- Albion railway station, Melbourne
- Kororoit Creek
- Kororoit Creek Trail
