= Kings Park, Victoria =

Kings Park Melbourne, Victoria
- Coordinates: 37.734°S 144.772°E
- Population: 8,203 (2021 census)
  - Density: 3,280/km^{2} (8,500/sq mi)
- Postcode(s): 3021
- Area: 2.5 km^{2} (1.0 sq mi)
- Location: 19 km (12 mi) from Melbourne
- LGA(s): City of Brimbank
- State electorate(s): Kororoit
- Federal division(s): Gorton
Suburbs around Kings Park:
| Taylors Hill | Delahey | Keilor Downs |
| Caroline Springs | Kings Park | St Albans |
| Burnside | Albanvale | St Albans |

Kings Park is a suburb in Melbourne, Victoria, Australia, 19 km (12 mi) north-west of Melbourne Central Business District, located within the City of Brimbank local government area. Kings Park recorded a population of 8,203 at the 2021 census.

Kings Park was named after the King family, whose farm formed of the land the estate was developed on. Kings Road which forms the eastern boundary was also named after the King family and the family farm house was located on Kings Road, near the current intersection with Grevillea Road.

The suburb began as a housing estate within the St Albans 3021 postcode area which eventually became an official suburb with the same 3021 postcode.

The estate began construction c. 1971 with the first stage consisting of Gillespie Road (south), Kings Park Reserve (west), Magnolia Avenue (north) and the existing Kings Road (east). At the time Kings Road was a single lane of bitumen with gravel on either side.

Stage 2 consisted of the area bounded by Maplewood Road/Fairmont Street (east), Taylors Road (north), Braeswood Road (west) and Gillespie Road (south) and was completed in 1972. At the time Taylors Road was a gravel road west of Kings Road.

With the ongoing expansion in various stages the current boundaries for Kings Park are Taylors Road (north), Kings Road (east), Main Road West (south) and Kororoit Creek and the City of Brimbank/City of Melton LGA boundary (west).

== Education ==
The following education facilities are within Kings Park:

- Copperfield College Kings Park Junior Campus (formerly Kings Park Secondary College and Kings Park High School)
- Kings Park Primary School
- Movelle Primary School
- Resurrection Catholic Primary School
- Kings Park Kindergarten

== Sporting Facilities ==
Kings Park Reserve is located on Gillespie Road with facilities for AFL football, Cricket and Lawn Bowls.

It is the home to the St Albans "Saints" Football Club which plays in the Western Region Football League with various Male and Female senior and junior teams playing in the Red and Blue colours made famous by the Melbourne AFL team.

The St Albans (Lawn) Bowls Club and a Scout Hall are also located within the reserve and accessed from the Magnolia Ave entry.

== Christmas Display ==
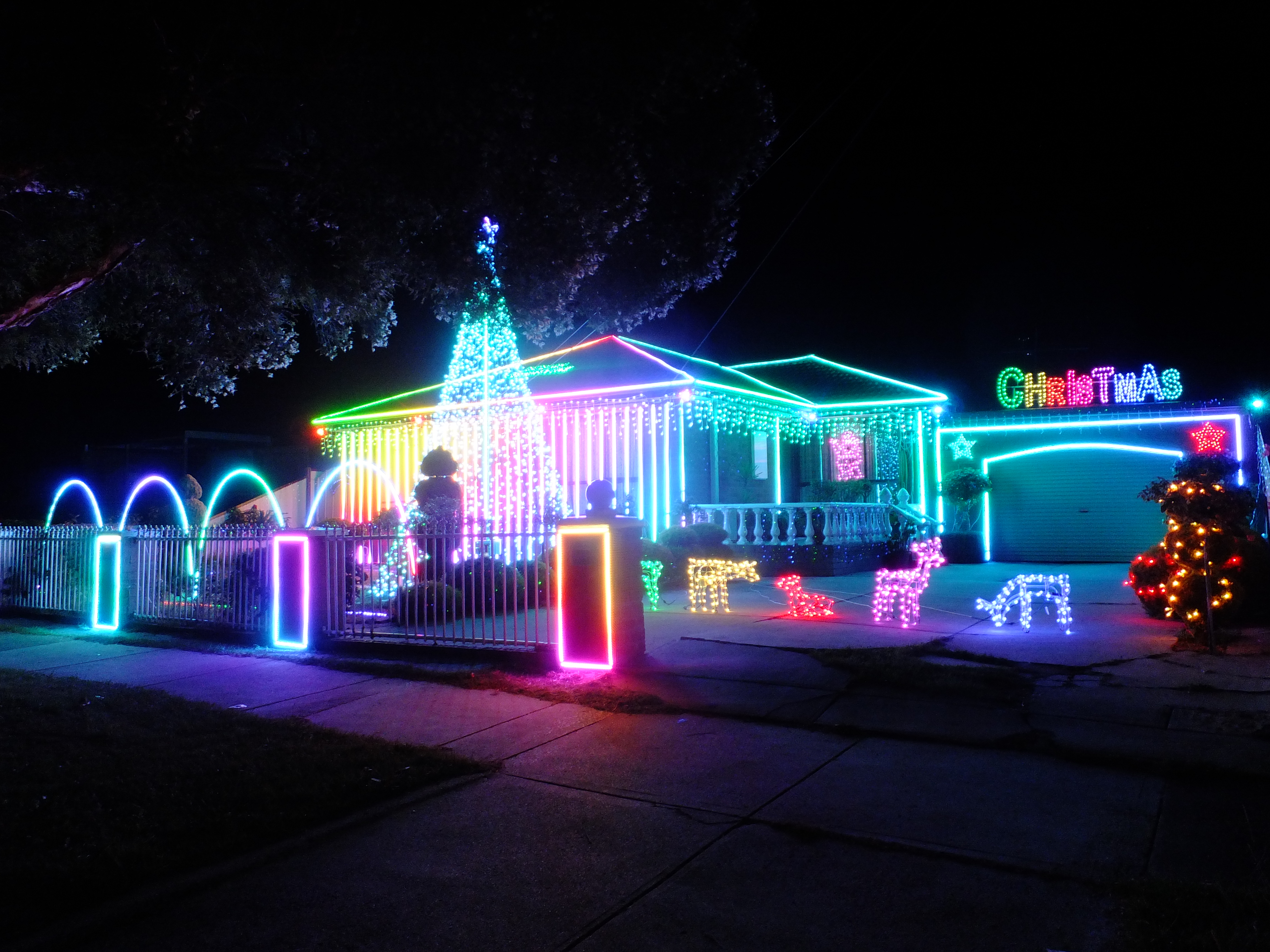
108 Gillespie Road Christmas Light display in Kings Park

Kings Park is also home to Melbourne's 108 Gillespie Road Christmas Light display. The attraction draws crowds from all over Melbourne to visit the light and sound masterpiece. Ever since it started in 2014, the display has grown in popularity and went viral on many online platforms. The display is synced to a wide range of music and is broadcast through a radio station to visitors in the cars.

== Transport ==
=== Trains ===
The nearest railway stations to Kings Park are St Albans and Keilor Plains.

=== Buses ===
The following PTV bus routes pass through or near Kings Park to various nearby shopping centres or railway stations: 418, 420, 424 and 425.

== See also ==
- City of Keilor – Kings Park was previously within this former local government area.
- Kororoit Creek Trail
