= Deer Park, Victoria =

Deer Park
- Suburb
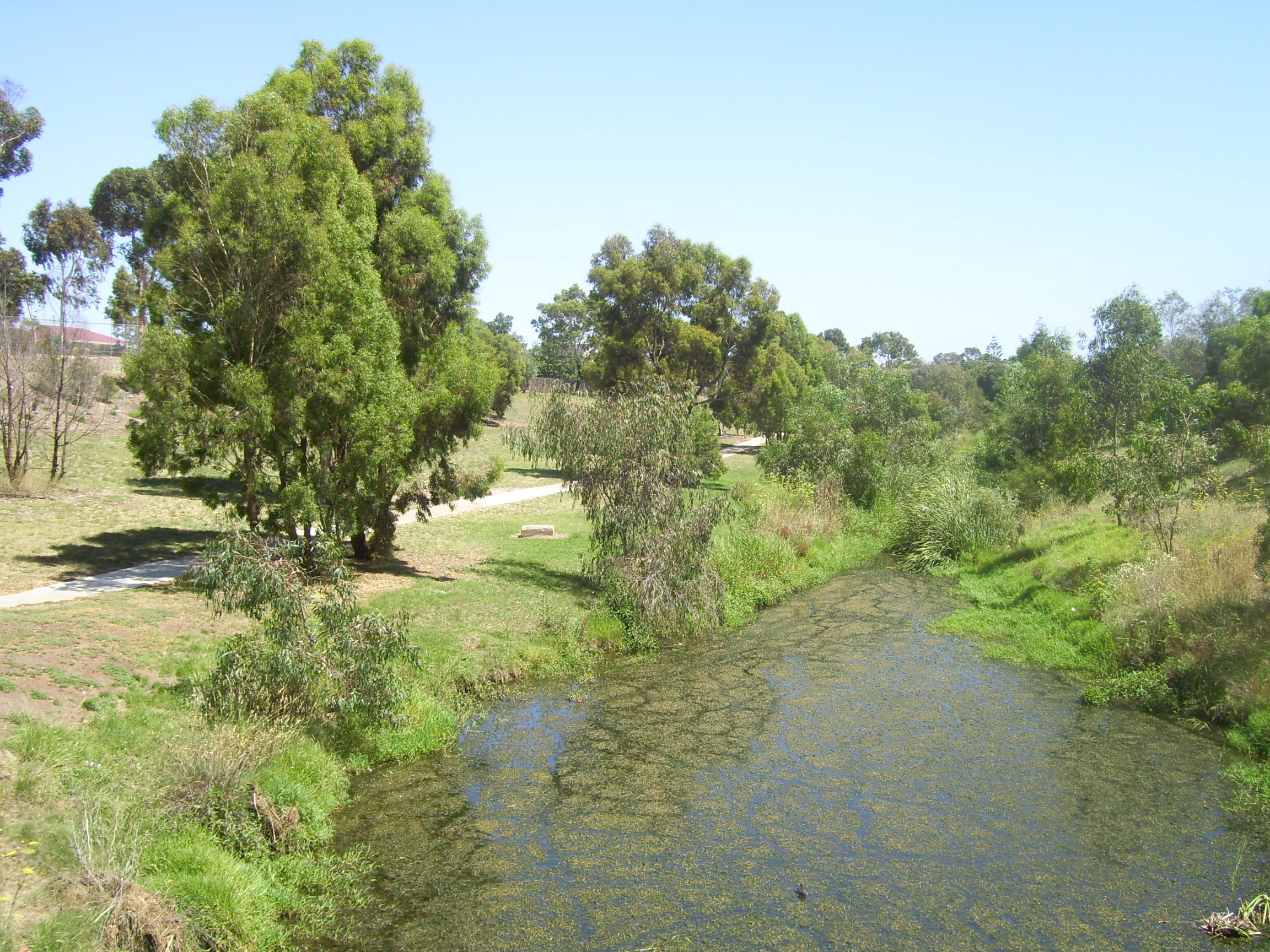
- Kororoit Creek at Deer Park

- Interactive map of Deer Park
- Coordinates: 37.763°S 144.767°E
- Country: Australia
- State: Victoria
- City: Melbourne
- LGA: City of Brimbank
- Location: 17 km (11 mi) from Melbourne
- Established: 1870s

Government
  - State electorate: Kororoit
  - Federal divisions: Fraser; Gorton

Area
  - Total: 9.3 km^{2} (3.6 sq mi)

Population
  - Total: 18,145 (2021 census)
  - Density: 1,951/km^{2} (5,053/sq mi)
- Postcode: 3023
Suburbs around Deer Park
| Burnside | Albanvale | Cairnlea |
| Ravenhall | Deer Park | Ardeer |
| Ravenhall | Derrimut | Sunshine West |

Deer Park is a suburb in Melbourne, Victoria, Australia, 17 km (11 mi) west of the Melbourne central business district, located within the City of Brimbank local government area. Deer Park recorded a population of 18,145 at the 2021 census.

== History ==
The suburb was originally named Kororoit Creek, after the creek running through the suburb but was renamed after the Melbourne Hunt Club used the area to house their stock of game deer. The original Hunt Club building still stands on Ballarat Road, next to the Deer Park sports oval and is now a community centre. The Hunt Club was opened on Saturday, 11 July 1885. The Post Office opened in 1878 as Kororoit Creek, and was renamed Deer Park in 1889.

Following the discovery of gold in Ballarat and Bendigo to the west, there was a great demand for explosives. Deer Park was the site of Melbourne's first explosives factory, commenced by Jones Scott and Co in 1874 and later reformed as Australian Explosives and Chemical Co, then Nobel (Australasia), Imperial Chemical Industries of Australia and New Zealand (ICIANZ) and most recently Orica. The site was chosen for its isolation, as it was several miles from the outskirts of Melbourne. The availability of water in Kororoit Creek was also a factor. In the 1920s, Nobel constructed a number of houses around its factory for workers and managers, expanding the former rural village into a substantial industrial suburb.

A fatal accident at the factory in 1923 led to production of black powder being stopped. In 1928, Imperial Chemical Industries of Australia and New Zealand (ICI, now Orica) took control of the factory. A new Black Powder factory was built in Deer Park in 1936 and enlarged during World War II. Charcoal from Australian timbers also began to be manufactured.

Suburban expansion in the 1920s was slowed during the 1930s depression, but in the post war period the suburb expanded rapidly. With labour shortages and a large demand for products during the post-war boom, ICI commenced housing development in Deer Park to attract workers to the area and many of the surrounding streets are named for localities in the UK, where ICI had operations.

== Transport ==
Deer Park railway station is on the Ararat railway line. The station is also served by trains running via the Regional Rail Link which forms part of the Geelong line. RRL also completed a minor upgrade to the station and that portion of the Serviceton line, and the junction between the RRL and Melton line is situated three kilometres west of Deer Park station, just beyond the former Robinsons Road level crossing.

Melbourne bus routes 215, 400, 420, 422, 426 and 456 service the area, with the 422 and 420 servicing the Deer Park station.

The main road through Deer Park is Ballarat Road, which carries traffic between Melbourne and Ballarat, Victoria's third largest city. Station Road intersects north–south with Ballarat Road and is a major local route. The Deer Park Bypass, completed in 2009, allows motorists to avoid the suburban streets of Deer Park on their journey from Melbourne to Caroline Springs, Ballarat and beyond.

== Facilities ==
=== Education ===
Deer Park boasts two public primary schools, a Catholic primary school, and a secondary college.

- Deer Park North Primary School
- Deer Park West Primary School
- St Peter Chanel Catholic Primary School
- Victoria University Secondary College – Junior Campus

== Prison ==
The Deer Park Metropolitan Women's Correctional Centre, which opened on 15 August 1996, was the first privately owned and operated prison in Victoria. It transferred to public ownership on 3 October 2000 and was renamed the Dame Phyllis Frost Centre, after prison welfare campaigner Phyllis Frost. It is run by Corrections Victoria.

== Today ==
On the southern outskirts of the suburb there are large farm properties which have now being developed for housing under the development names Brimbank Gardens and St Andrews Field. This area surrounds Mount Derrimut, which saw the relocation of the Sunshine Golf Club to allow its former location, east of Fitzgerald Road, to be redeveloped as housing.

== Sports ==
Deer Park Football Club is the local Australian Rules football team, competing in the EDFL since 2023. There are also cricket, rugby union and tennis clubs in the suburb.

== Notable residents ==
- Marlene Kairouz
- Marilyn Anderson, fellow of the Australian Academy of Science

== See also ==
- City of Sunshine – Deer Park was previously within this former local government area.
