= Electoral district of Kororoit =

State electoral district of Victoria, Australia

Kororoit Victoria—Legislative Assembly
- Interactive map of electoral district boundaries from the 2022 state election
- State: Victoria
- Created: 2002
- MP: Luba Grigorovitch
- Party: Labor
- Namesake: Kororoit Creek
- Electors: 51,161 (2018)
- Area: 124 km^{2} (47.9 sq mi)
- Demographic: Metropolitan

The electoral district of Kororoit is an electorate of the Victorian Legislative Assembly covering Aintree, Albanvale, Burnside, Burnside Heights, Caroline Springs, Kings Park, Ravenhall, and Rockbank as well as some parts of Deer Park and Derrimut in the western suburbs of Melbourne. The district's namesake is the Kororoit Creek. Often considered to be a very safe Labor seat, the seat has been won by Labor in every election since its creation in 2002.

== History ==
The seat was created prior to the 2002 election during a redistribution of Victoria's electorate boundaries in 2001. The seat consisted of electors from the districts of Keilor, Melton, and Sunshine. The same redistribution turned Labor Party powerbroker and cabinet minister Andre Haermeyer's seat of Yan Yean into a marginal Liberal seat, which led to Haermeyer deciding to contest Kororoit. He won the seat with a margin of 27.1% making it the fourth-safest Labor seat in the state. Haermeyer retained the seat in the 2006 election.

On 2 June 2008, Haermeyer retired, prompting a by-election for the seat of Kororoit. Labor candidate Marlene Kairouz won the seat, with 59.4% of the two-party preferred vote, compared to 40.6% for independent candidate Les Twentyman. Before the by-election, Labor held Kororoit by a 26% margin. Kairouz retained the seat in the 2010, 2014, and 2018 elections.

During a redistribution of Victoria's electoral boundaries in 2013, Kororoit's boundaries were expanded to cover part of the abolished electoral district of Derrimut, as well as part of the electoral district of Melton. Kororoit also lost part of the suburb of St Albans to the new electoral district of the same name.

As of 2022, the seat is held by Luba Grigorovitch, who was elected at the 2022 Victorian state election following the retirement of Marlene Kairouz. Kairouz was not pre-selected for the 2022 election due to her connections with Adem Somyurek, who was allegedly involved in branch stacking. During the redistribution that preceded the election, Kororoit lost Cairnlea to the district of St Albans, as well as Thornhill Park to the district of Melton.

== Members for Kororoit ==
Member	Party	Term
Andre Haermeyer	Labor	2002–2008
Marlene Kairouz	Labor	2008–2022
Luba Grigorovitch	Labor	2022–present

== Election results ==
2022 Victorian state election: Kororoit
Party	Candidate	Votes	%	±%
Labor	Luba Grigorovitch	17,468	43.3	−20.1
Liberal	John Fletcher	9,801	24.3	+3.5
Victorian Socialists	Belle Gibson	2,768	6.9	+6.9
Greens	Ben Chester	2,650	6.6	−1.7
Democratic Labour	Zuzanna Brown	2,517	6.2	+6.2
Family First	Melanie Milutinovic	2,326	5.8	+5.8
Animal Justice	Katherine Divita	1,242	3.1	−4.5
Independent	Joh Bauch	978	2.4	+2.4
New Democrats	Jaz Chandok	623	1.5	+1.5
Total formal votes		40,373	91.6	–1.2
Informal votes		3,683	8.4	+1.2
Turnout		44,056	86.3	+3.5
Two-party-preferred result
Labor	Luba Grigorovitch	26,047	64.5	−10.8
Liberal	John Fletcher	14,326	35.5	+10.8
Labor hold		Swing	−10.8	
