= Cairnlea =

- Suburb
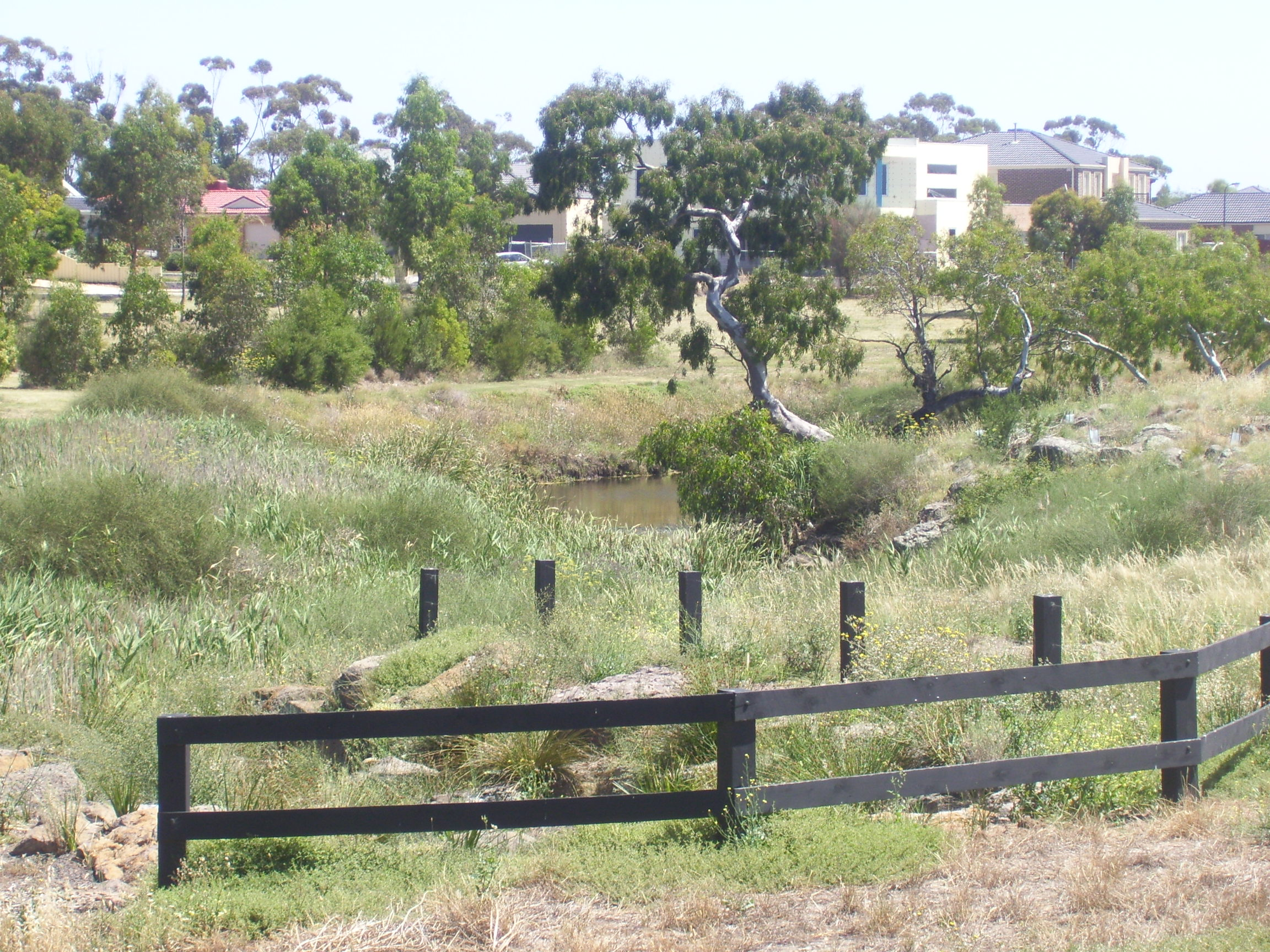
- Kororoit Creek at Cairnlea

- Interactive map of Cairnlea
- Coordinates: 37.757°S 144.784°E
- Country: Australia
- State: Victoria
- City: Melbourne
- LGA: City of Brimbank
- Location: 17 km (11 mi) from Melbourne
- Established: 1999

Government
  - State electorate: Kororoit
  - Federal division: Fraser

Population
  - Total: 10,038 (2021 census)
- Postcode: 3023
- Mean max temp: 19.6 °C (67.3 °F)
- Mean min temp: 9.2 °C (48.6 °F)
- Annual rainfall: 539.9 mm (21.26 in)
Suburbs around Cairnlea
Albanvale	St Albans	St Albans
Deer Park	Cairnlea	St Albans
Deer Park	Deer Park, Ardeer	Albion

Cairnlea is a suburb in Melbourne, Victoria, Australia, 17 km (11 mi) north-west of Melbourne's central business district, located within the City of Brimbank local government area. Cairnlea recorded a population of 10,038 at the 2021 census.

== History ==
The former Albion site became open grassland after European settlement but later, from 1939, it was a government explosives manufacturing site. The site closed in the 1990s.

The suburb is a new estate, and has only been developed since 1999, with development of the new suburb finished in mid-2005. The suburb features several man-made lakes and has implemented a suburb-wide stormwater recycling system that feeds all the lakes.

By 2011 Cairnlea is projected to have 3,000 residential blocks and to have a population of more than 10,000. It covers 460 hectares (4.6 km^{2}) bounded by Station Road, the Western Highway and the Western Ring Road.

=== Heritage listing ===
The following place in Cairnlea is listed on the Victorian Heritage Register:

- Black Powder Mill, at the junction of Parklea Avenue and Grassy Point Road, a former gunpowder mill

== Geography ==
Kororoit Creek is located on the southern border of the suburb and Jones Creek on the Northern Border. The creeks have been home to healthy populations of native reptiles for thousands of years, including tiger snake, eastern blue-tongued lizard and eastern brown snake. Unfortunately, due to development over the past 20 years, these species are now rarely seen in the area.

Due to development of lakes and wetlands, species of frogs have reclaimed the area. The Eastern Banjo Frog, common eastern froglet and even the now endangered growling grass frog have been seen and heard in the new wetlands and in Kororoit Creek. Some species of birds are also returning to the creeks and lakes, such as pelicans and cormorants.

- Brimbank Park
- Kororoit Creek Trail

Due to the former industrial use as an explosives factory, the land was highly contaminated. Much of the area was remediated for office and then residential development although many toxic chemicals remain in the area.

=== Landmarks ===
Local landmarks include the heritage-listed Black Powder Mill, the Cairnlea Community Hub, the Cairnlea Town Centre, the Victorian Croquet Club, and Cairnlea FC.

== Economy ==
The Cairnlea Shopping Centre provides a number of small shops, a super-clinic, a Coles supermarket and a number of food and dining outlets. It is located at the intersection of Cairnlea Drive and Furlong Road.

== Education ==
- Cairnlea Park Primary School
- Victoria University Secondary College - Senior campus

== Parks and gardens ==
Some 130 hectares (320 acres) have been set aside for public open space. Part of that process has seen two endangered species (the Plains Rice-flower and the Striped Legless Lizard) having reserves and management plans set up for their preservation.
