= Ardeer, Victoria =

Ardeer
- Suburb
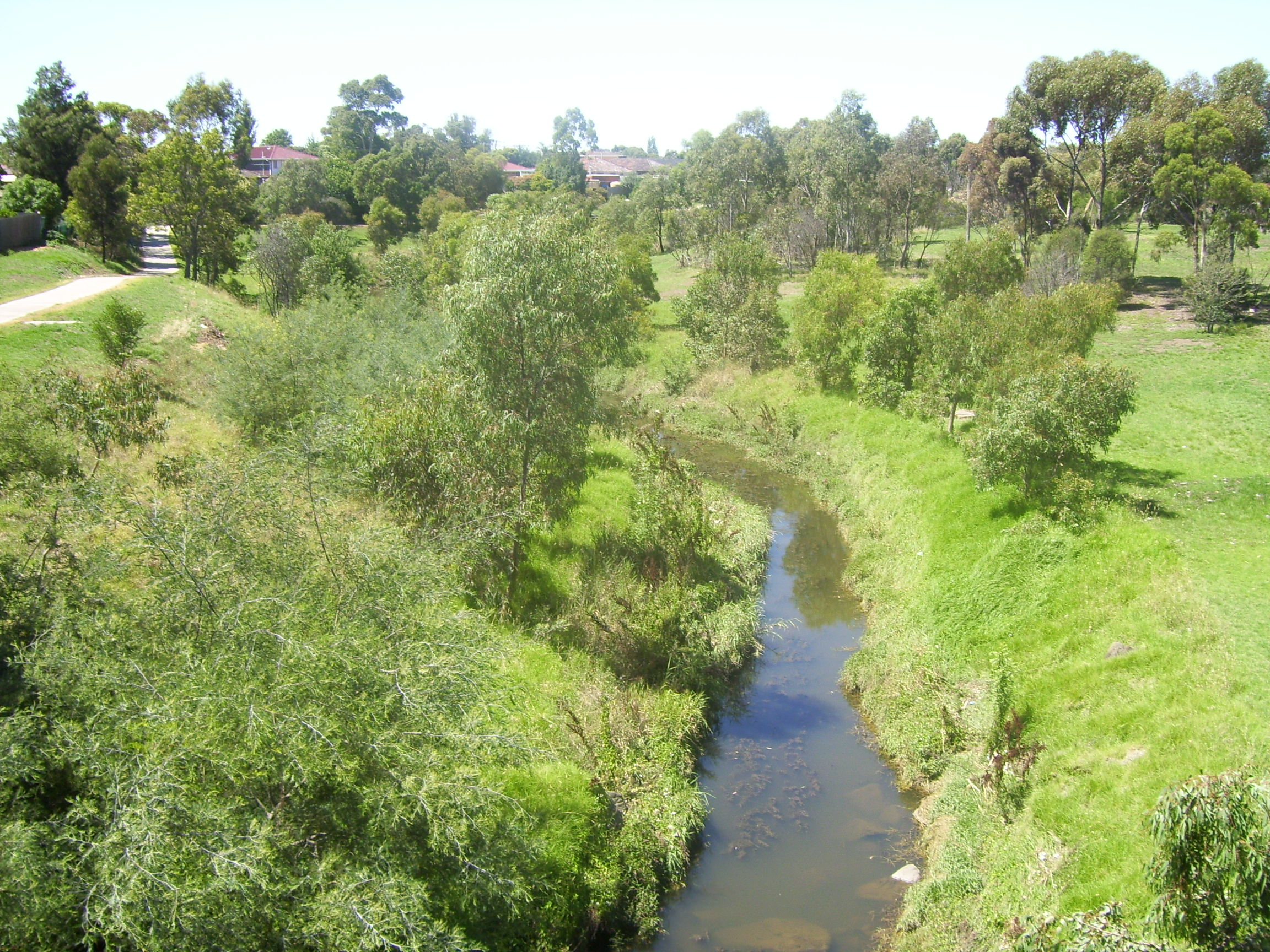
- Kororoit Creek

- Interactive map of Ardeer
- Coordinates: 37.785°S 144.802°E
- Country: Australia
- State: Victoria
- City: Melbourne
- LGA: City of Brimbank
- Location: 15 km (9.3 mi) from Melbourne

Government
  - State electorates: St Albans; Laverton
  - Federal division: Fraser

Area
  - Total: 2.1 km^{2} (0.81 sq mi)

Population
  - Total: 3,170 (2021 census)
  - Density: 1,510/km^{2} (3,910/sq mi)
- Postcode: 3022
Suburbs around Ardeer
Cairnlea	St Albans	Albion
Deer Park	Ardeer	Albion
	Sunshine West

Ardeer is a suburb in Melbourne, Victoria, Australia, 15 km (9.3 mi) west of the Melbourne central business district, located within the City of Brimbank local government area. Ardeer recorded a population of 3,170 at the 2021 census.

Ardeer railway station is on the Serviceton railway line.

== History ==
The suburb of Ardeer is named after Ardeer railway station, which in turn was named for Ardeer, Scotland, which was a major explosives factory of Nobel/ICI. Nobel acquired the Deer Park explosives factory in about 1929, expanded it, and established new residential areas in the vicinity for its workers. Many streets in Deer Park are named for places associated with Nobel and ICI in Britain. Ardeer Post Office opened on 1 December 1953 as suburban development took place and closed in 1979. Ardeer today is a small suburb split into two enclaves by Kororoit Creek. The area south of Forrest Street, previously known as Ardeer, was rezoned in the late 1990s to be incorporated into Sunshine West.

== Facilities ==
=== Education ===
- Ardeer Primary School
- Mother of God School

=== Religion ===
Bao Vuong Temple, a Vietnamese Buddhist temple, is located in the suburb. Ardeer also has a Ukrainian Catholic church and a Polish Catholic church.

=== Sports ===
Westgate FC is the local soccer club. Formed by Serbian immigrants in 1985, it competes in the Victorian State League Division 1 N/W, the 4th tier of the Victorian soccer pyramid.

== Kororoit Creek ==
A section of the Kororoit Creek runs along the north and west border of Ardeer. The Kororoit Creek Trail contains wide open park space and native vegetation rarely seen so close to the Melbourne central business district.

In October 2007, John Brumby announced that funding would be provided to link the Kororoit Creek Trail to the Federation Trail, joining two western suburb bike paths.

== Notable residents ==
- Brian Barnett OAM, herpetologist.

== See also ==
- City of Sunshine – Ardeer was previously within this former local government area.
