= Sunshine West =

- Suburb
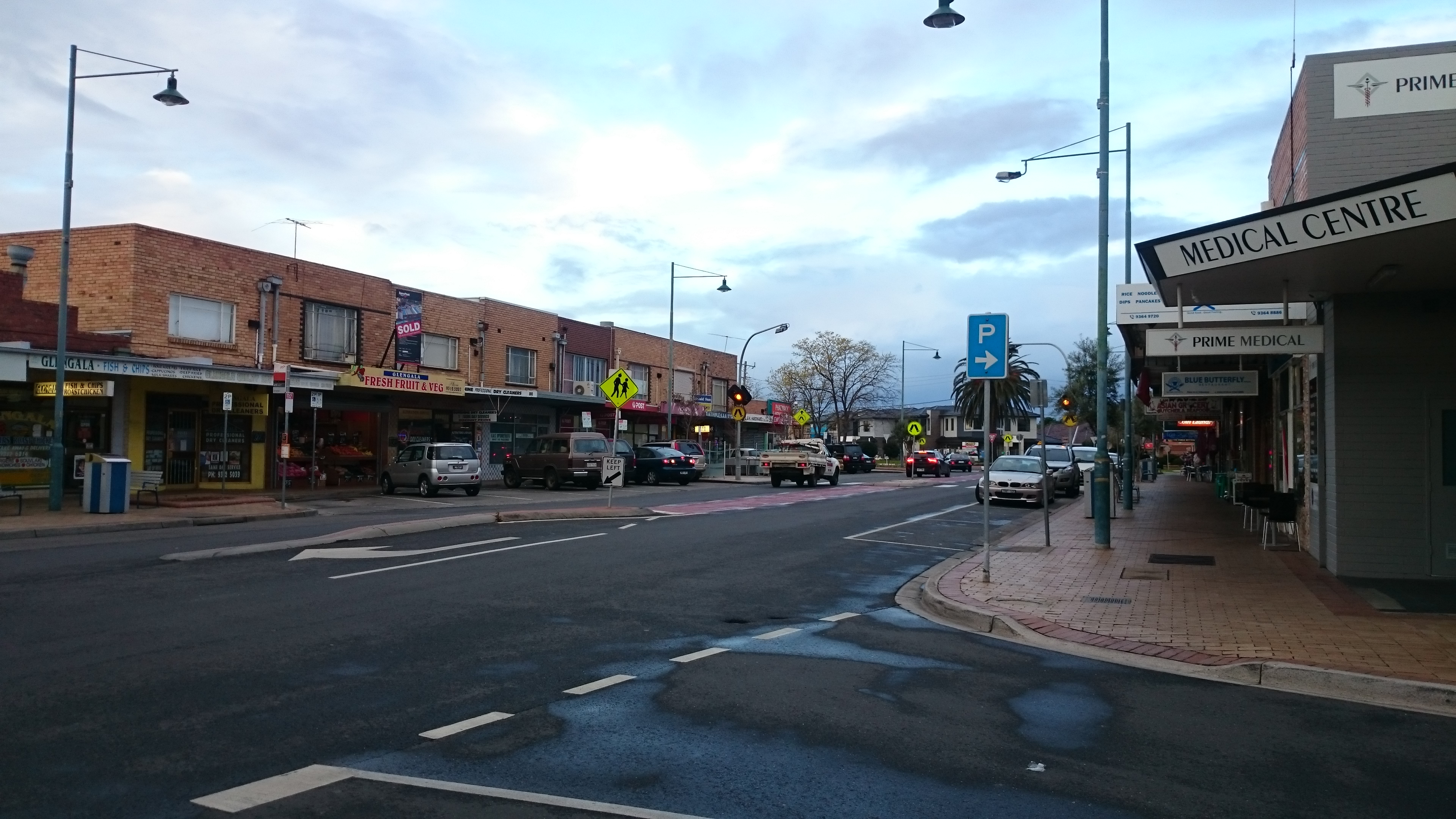
- Glengala Village in Sunshine West

- Interactive map of Sunshine West
- Coordinates: 37.795°S 144.816°E
- Country: Australia
- State: Victoria
- City: Melbourne
- LGA: City of Brimbank
- Location: 13 km (8.1 mi) from Melbourne

Government
  - State electorate: Laverton
  - Federal division: Fraser

Area
  - Total: 7.9 km^{2} (3.1 sq mi)
- Elevation: 34 m (112 ft)

Population
  - Total: 18,552 (2021 census)
  - Density: 2,348/km^{2} (6,080/sq mi)
- Postcode: 3020
Suburbs around Sunshine West
Ardeer	Albion	Sunshine
Derrimut	Sunshine West	Sunshine
Derrimut	Laverton North	Brooklyn

Sunshine West is a suburb in Melbourne, Victoria, Australia, 13 km (8.1 mi) west of Melbourne's central business district, located within the City of Brimbank local government area. Sunshine West recorded a population of 18,552 at the 2021 census.

Sunshine West is a residential and industrial area. It is bounded by Forrest Street in the north, Kororoit Creek in the east, Boundary Road in the south and the Western Ring Road in the west.

== History ==
Settlement of the area dates from the 1920s when the Sunshine Heights Estate was developed. Sunshine West Post Office opened on 1 July 1939 and closed in 1981. Significant development did not occur until the post-war years, with rapid growth from the 1970s through to the 1980s. The population declined slightly from the early 1990s, a result of some new dwellings being added to the area, but a decline in the average number of persons living in each dwelling.

== Facilities and features ==
Major features of the area include the Sunshine Wisdom Lodge – Freemasons Victoria, Saint Leopold Mandić Croatian Catholic Church and Centre, West Sunshine Community Centre, Ainsworth Reserve, Buckingham Reserve, Norm Talintyre Reserve, the Australia Post Parcel Facility, the nearby Ardeer railway station and numerous schools.

The suburb hosts the Sunshine Heights Football Club in the Western Regional Football League.

=== Places of worship ===
- Saint Leopold Mandić Croatian Catholic Church, located on the corner of Fitzgerald Road and Whitesides Avenue
- Saint Paul's Roman Catholic Church, located on Glengala Road
- Saint Andrew's Greek Orthodox Church, located on St Andrew Street
- Saint Anthony's Greek Orthodox Church, located on Armstrong Street

== Demographics ==
Sunshine West presently features a significant ethnically diverse population, being home to many refugees and immigrant families that have settled from Europe, Asia and the Pacific, especially from Malta, Greece, Italy, North Macedonia, Croatia, Vietnam, China and the Philippines.

According to the 2021 Census, the population of Sunshine West was 18,558. 50.6% of the population was male, and 49.4% was female. The median age was 38 years old.

43% of residents were born in Australia. The next top responses were 13.8% in Vietnam, India 2.9%, Malta 2.8%, Philippines 2.4%, and Greece 2.3% . The top languages spoken at home were English at 31.7%, Vietnamese at 20.3%, Greek 4.7%, Maltese 2.8%, Cantonese 2.4%, and Macedonian at 2.3%.

The religious makeup of Sunshine West is Catholic at 29.2%, no religion at 22.1%, Buddhism 11.8%, Islam 9.6%, and Eastern Orthodox at 8.0%.

== See also ==
- City of Sunshine – Sunshine West was previously within this former local government area.
