= Albanvale =

- Suburb
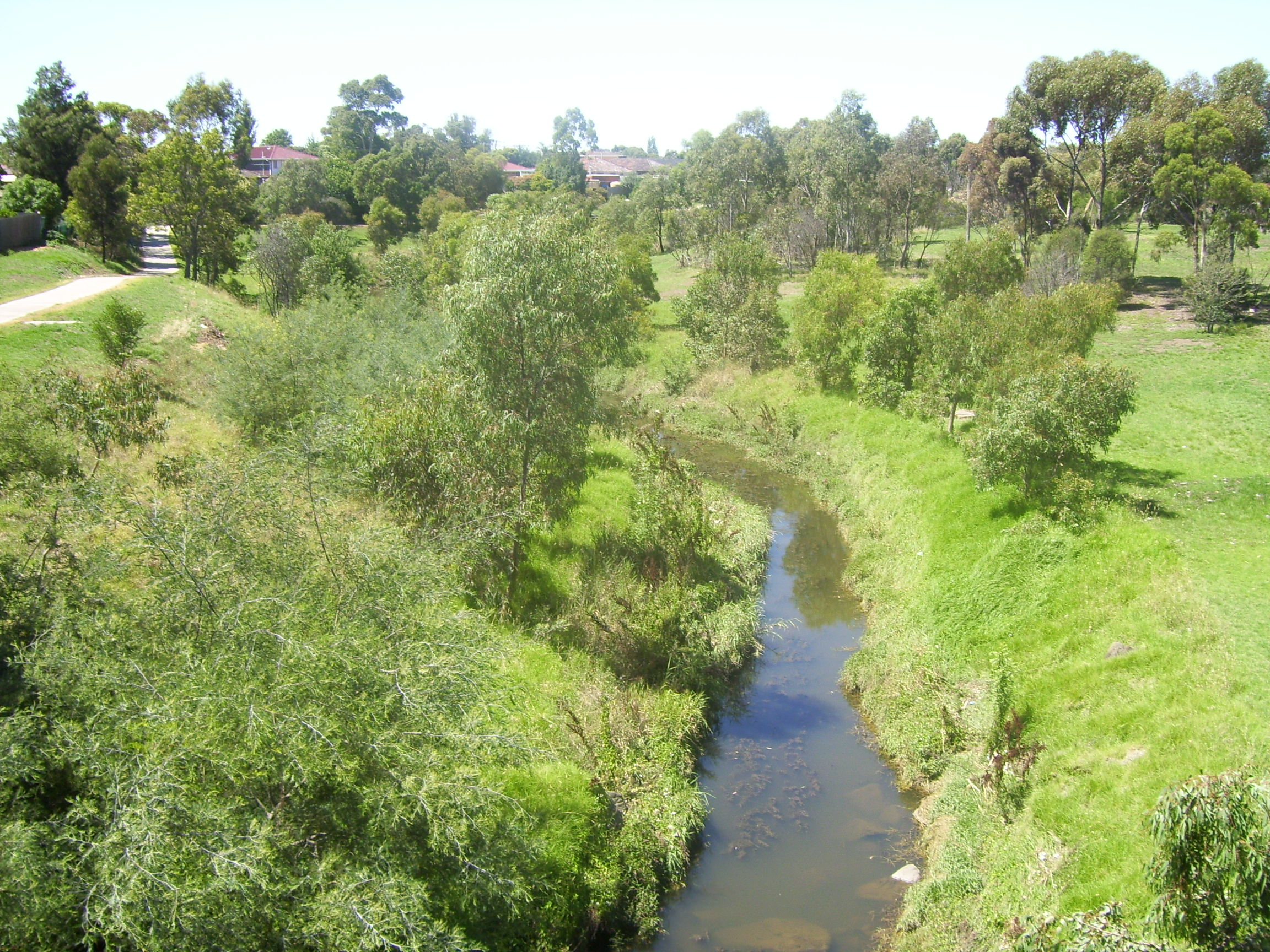
- Kororoit Creek

- Interactive map of Albanvale
- Coordinates: 37.746°S 144.765°E
- Country: Australia
- State: Victoria
- City: Melbourne
- LGA: City of Brimbank
- Location: 18 km (11 mi) from Melbourne
- Established: 1970s

Government
  - State electorate: Kororoit
  - Federal division: Gorton

Area
  - Total: 2 km^{2} (0.77 sq mi)

Population
  - Total: 5,641 (2021 census)
  - Density: 2,800/km^{2} (7,300/sq mi)
- Postcode: 3021
Suburbs around Albanvale
	Kings Park	St Albans
Burnside	Albanvale	St Albans
	Deer Park	Cairnlea

Albanvale is a suburb in Melbourne, Victoria, Australia, 18 km (11 mi) north-west of Melbourne's central business district, located within the City of Brimbank local government area. Albanvale recorded a population of 5,641 at the 2021 census.

The border of Albanvale consists of Station Road, Main Road West, Kororoit Creek, Fairfax Circuit, Concord Circuit and Brimbank Central Shopping Centre. The 2009 edition of the Melway Street Directory clearly marks the shopping centre in Deer Park. The suburb was established in the 1970s.

== Attractions ==
- Brimbank Central Shopping Centre
- Kororoit Creek
- Kororoit Creek Trail

== Education ==
- Albanvale Primary School
- Victoria University Secondary College

== Flora and fauna ==
The Kororoit Creek forms the 700m western border of the suburb. This area once had large healthy populations of native reptiles, including tiger snake, eastern blue-tongued lizard, common snakeneck turtle and eastern brown snake. Due to development these species are now rarely seen in the area.

Due to the recent development of the Cairnlea and Burnside estates, on the southern and eastern borders of Albanvale, native species of frogs have taken advantage and have taken up residence in the new wetlands and lakes. The common eastern froglet and the now endangered growling grass frog have been seen and heard in the new wetlands and around Kororoit Creek.

== Sports facilities ==
Albanvale Football Club is an Australian Rules football team competing in the Western Region Football League.

== See also ==
- City of Sunshine – Albanvale was previously within this former local government area.
- Kororoit Creek
- Kororoit Creek Trail
