= Altona Coastal Park =

Nature reserve in Melbourne, Victoria, Australia

Coordinates: 37°51′41.50″S 144°51′19.92″E

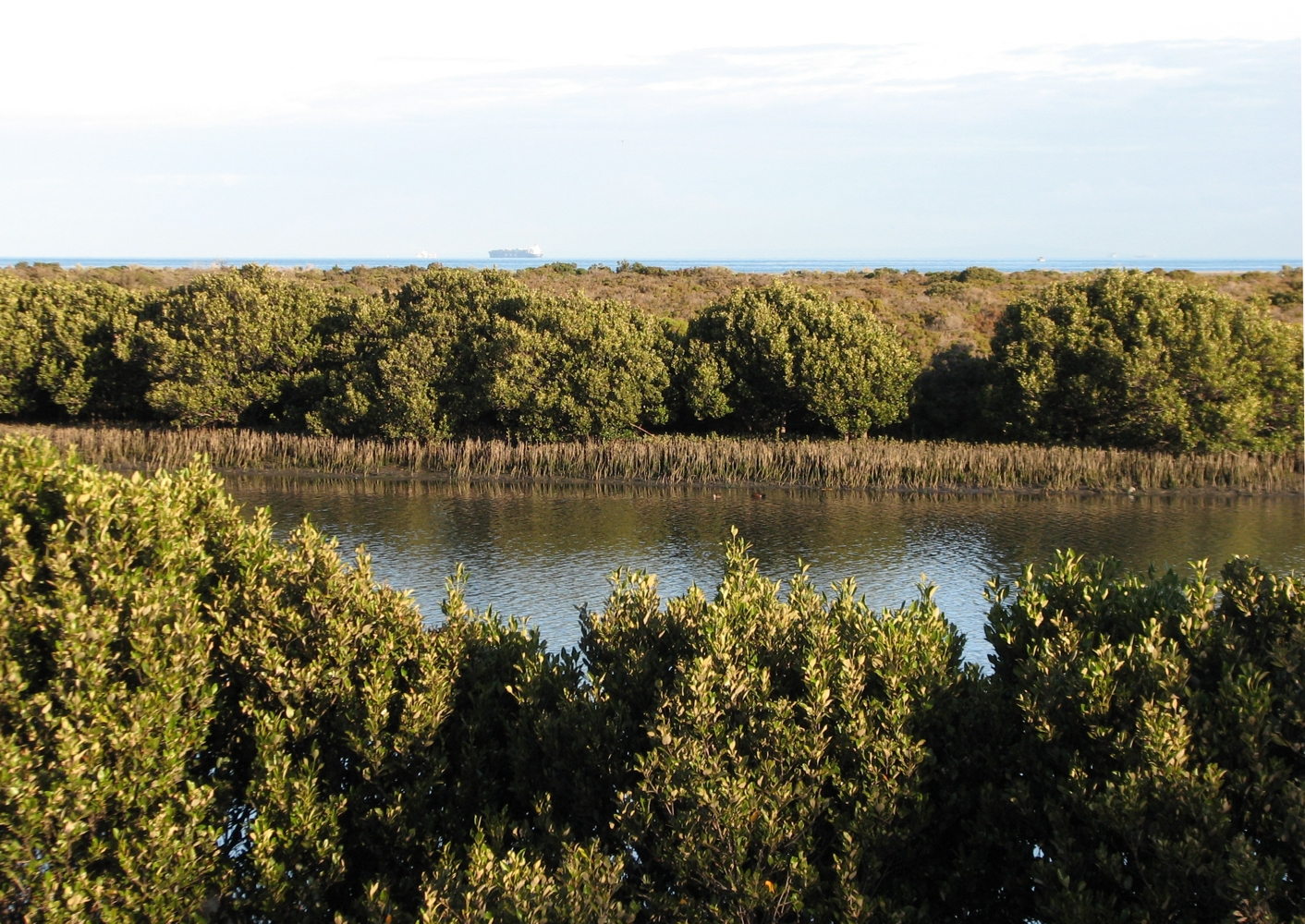
Mangroves on Kororoit Creek, with Port Phillip Bay in the distance

Altona Coastal Park, a 70 hectares intertidal and salt marsh area located 11 km from Melbourne CBD in the western suburb of Altona, is an important recreational and nature conservation area, providing habitats for a large biodiversity of flora and fauna. It is part of the Cheetham and Altona Important Bird Area.

== History ==
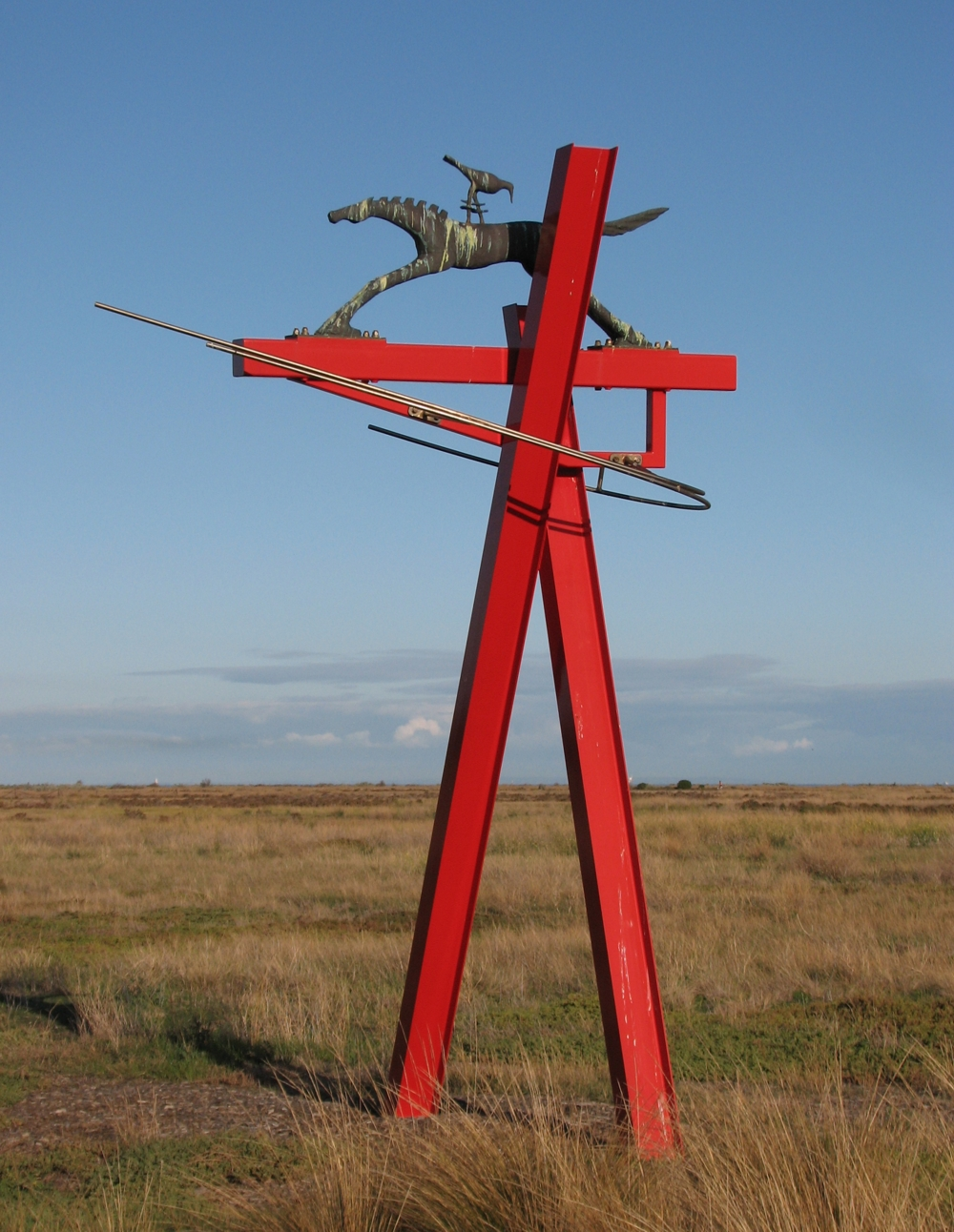
"Requiem for a Champion"

The park was the site of the Williamstown Racecourse from 1864 to 1940, which was closed in 1940 to make way for a World War II army camp. The site was extensively modified by land filling and site development, and was known as the Altona Sports Park before its current name was adopted.

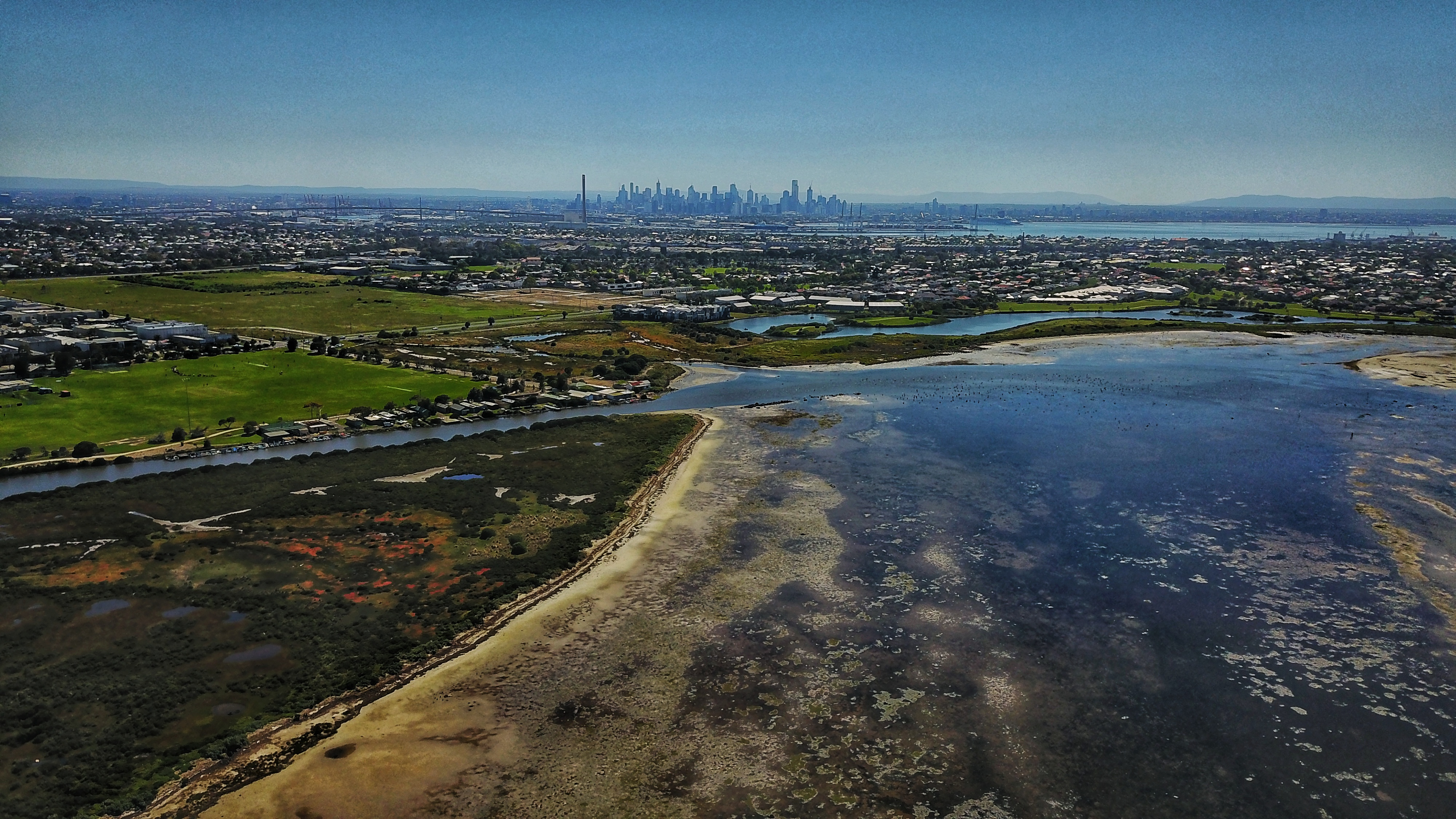
Aerial vista of the Melbourne CBD from Altona Coastal Park, 2018

The remnants of the Williamstown Racecourse grandstand and an associated palm tree at the entry to the grandstand still remain. A 4-metre sculpture called Requiem for a Champion, created by the artist Yvonne George, featuring a bronze stint perched on top of a galloping horse, was installed to commemorate the location of the former Williamstown racecourse.

== Flora ==
The Park has predominantly saltmarsh vegetation including shrubby glasswort and beaded glasswort, which provide food for the rare orange-bellied parrot. It has at least 8 regionally rare plant species, including the white mangroves (Avicennia marina) along the southern banks of Kororoit Creek

Large areas of Carpobrotus rossii can be found at the park. It blooms in late October, resulting in swathes of pink flowers.

Ongoing rehabilitation programs, which include revegetation of indigenous flora and weed removal, serve to enhance the area's ability to sustain a wider diversity of fauna.

== Fauna ==
At least 149 bird species are recorded here, of which 13 are rare or endangered.

The aquatic birds include black swans, black ducks, pelicans, stilt, giant petrels, ibis, cranes, gulls, red-legged oyster catchers, grey teal, spoonbills, dotterels while the terrestrial birds include blue wrens, larks, rosellas, magpie larks, little tits, crimson robins, nankeen kestrels, wagtails and ravens. Gould's wattled bat and the white striped freetail bat (both microbats) may also be found hunting insects at night.

In addition, one may find tiger snakes in the grasslands and rocky outcrops while native fish, crabs, oysters, cockles, periwinkles and larger warreners proliferate in the sea and creeks.

== Geology ==
The landform changes from grassy plains in the inner areas to salt marsh, shallow intertidal flats and rocky basalt platforms off the coast of Port Phillip Bay. Kororoit Creek flows through the Park into Port Phillip Bay. Regionally significant geomorphological areas can be found at the wetland terrain at the mouth of the Kororoit Creek as well as at the extensive sand bars off Kororoit Creek.

The Park provides a protective buffer zone for the Wader Beach area of the Jawbone Flora and Fauna Reserve, which is located between Williamstown and Altona.

== Recreational and community use ==
The park is popular with walkers, cyclists and dog-walkers, with the Hobsons Bay Coastal Trail passing through the park. The large, open spaces provide unrestricted views of Port Phillip Bay and Melbourne City across the salt marsh. At low tides when the seawater recedes, much of the coastal seabeds are exposed, allowing one to walk a considerable distance into the sea. The park is also used for research and study purposes.
