= Brooklyn, Victoria =

Brooklyn
- Suburb
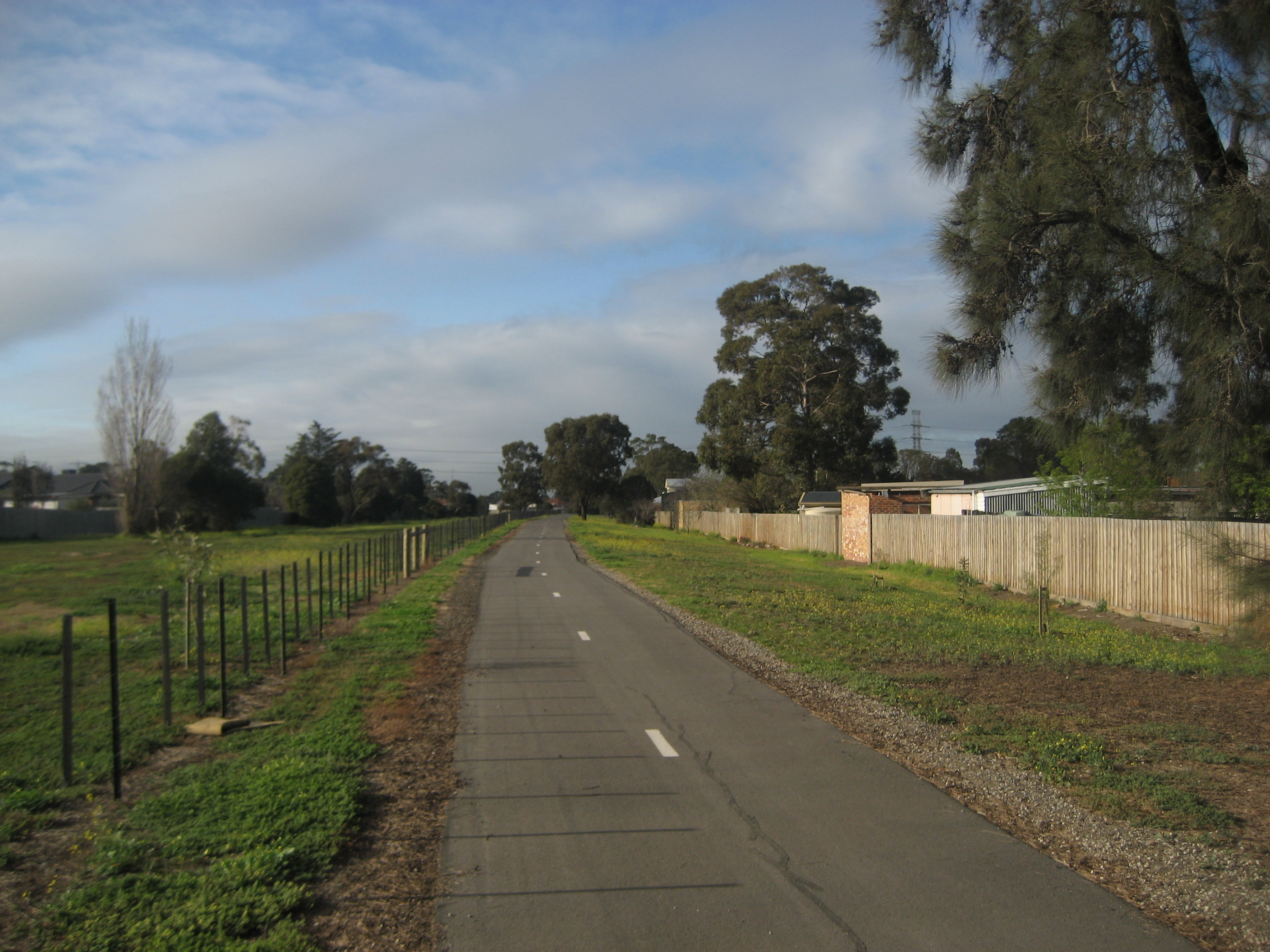
- Federation Trail

- Interactive map of Brooklyn
- Coordinates: 37.813°S 144.841°E
- Country: Australia
- State: Victoria
- City: Melbourne
- LGAs: City of Brimbank; City of Hobsons Bay
- Location: 10 km (6.2 mi) from Melbourne

Government
  - State electorates: Laverton; Williamstown
  - Federal division: Fraser

Area
  - Total: 5.2 km^{2} (2.0 sq mi)
- Elevation: 26 m (85 ft)

Population
  - Total: 1,979 (2021 census)
  - Density: 381/km^{2} (986/sq mi)
- Postcode: 3012
Suburbs around Brooklyn
Sunshine West	Sunshine	Tottenham
Sunshine West	Brooklyn	Yarraville
Laverton North	Altona North	Altona North

Brooklyn is a suburb in Melbourne, Victoria, Australia, 10 km (6.2 mi) west of Melbourne's Central Business District, located within the Cities of Brimbank and Hobsons Bay local government areas. Brooklyn recorded a population of 1,979 at the 2021 census.

== Demographics ==
According to the 2016 census the population of Brooklyn is 1,856, approximately 47.6% females and 52.4% males.

The median/average age of the people in Brooklyn is 33 years.

56.2% of people living in the suburb of Brooklyn were born in Australia. The other top responses for country of birth were 4.1% Vietnam, 3.3% Italy, 2.8% China, 3.6% New Zealand, 2.3% and 2.4% India.

55% of people living in Brooklyn speak English only. The other top languages spoken are 5.1% Vietnamese, 4.3% Italian, 3.6% Cantonese, 2.7% Mandarin and 2.4% Arabic.

Religious affiliations in Brooklyn are 30.9% no religion, 24.9% Catholic, 7.3% Islam, 4.6% Eastern Orthodox.

== Transport ==
- Route 232: Altona North – City (Queen Victoria Market)
- Route 411: Laverton Station – Footscray (via Altona Meadows and Altona)
- Route 412: Laverton Station – Footscray (via Altona Meadows and Altona)
- Route 414: Laverton Station – Footscray
- Route 903: Altona – Mordialloc (SMARTBUS service)

== Industry ==
Brooklyn is largely an industrial suburb, with a small pocket of low-density residential in the south. The industrial area features a landfill and recycling centre, offices for numerous logistics organisations, including CEVA Logistics, and distribution centres for HAG Import Corporation and Novo Shoes, as well as car dealerships, wreckers and auction centres.

The heritage-listed former Huntsman chemical plant on Somerville Road is located in Brooklyn. The Newport – Sunshine freight railway line also runs through the suburb.

The company featured in the mockumentary Kenny (2006), Splashdown, is located in Brooklyn.

The Southgate Melbourne data centre is located in Brooklyn. The Australian company Firmus.co announced Project Southgate (which included a promise to build a Melbourne site) in October 2025, and Firmus later secured a contract for 18,400 Nvidia GB300 GPUs to be deployed there.

== Other features ==
The Federation Trail is a shared use path for cyclists and pedestrians, which starts in Brooklyn on Millers Road.

Other parks and reserves in the area include D.N. Duane Reserve, Rowan Avenue Reserve, Kororoit Creek Reserve and Brooklyn Reserve, the latter of which features a playground, dog park and barbecue area.

Other amenities in the residential part of Brooklyn include a Community Centre and Tennis Courts on Cypress Avenue, as well as small shopping strips on Geelong Road and Eames Avenue.

There are also multiple adult entertainment venues operating in Brooklyn, including Club 741 located on Geelong Road.

=== Heritage listing ===
The following place in Brooklyn is listed on the Victorian Heritage Register:

- Main Outfall Sewer (former), the 25-kilometre-long (16 mi) sanitary sewer commences in Brooklyn and terminates at the Western Treatment Plant, near Werribee.

== Environmental issues ==
Early 2021, a fire started in a recycling facility in Old Geelong Road. The site handles different types of waste including e-waste and green waste and serves as a transfer station. The fire was contained by Fire Rescue Victoria the same morning. Some localised smoke impacts were reported by EPA Victoria and as the wind blew the smoke towards Altona North and southern suburbs, local communities received an advice message.

== See also ==
- City of Sunshine – Brooklyn was previously within this former local government area.
- Kororoit Creek
