= Burnside, Victoria =

Burnside
- Suburb
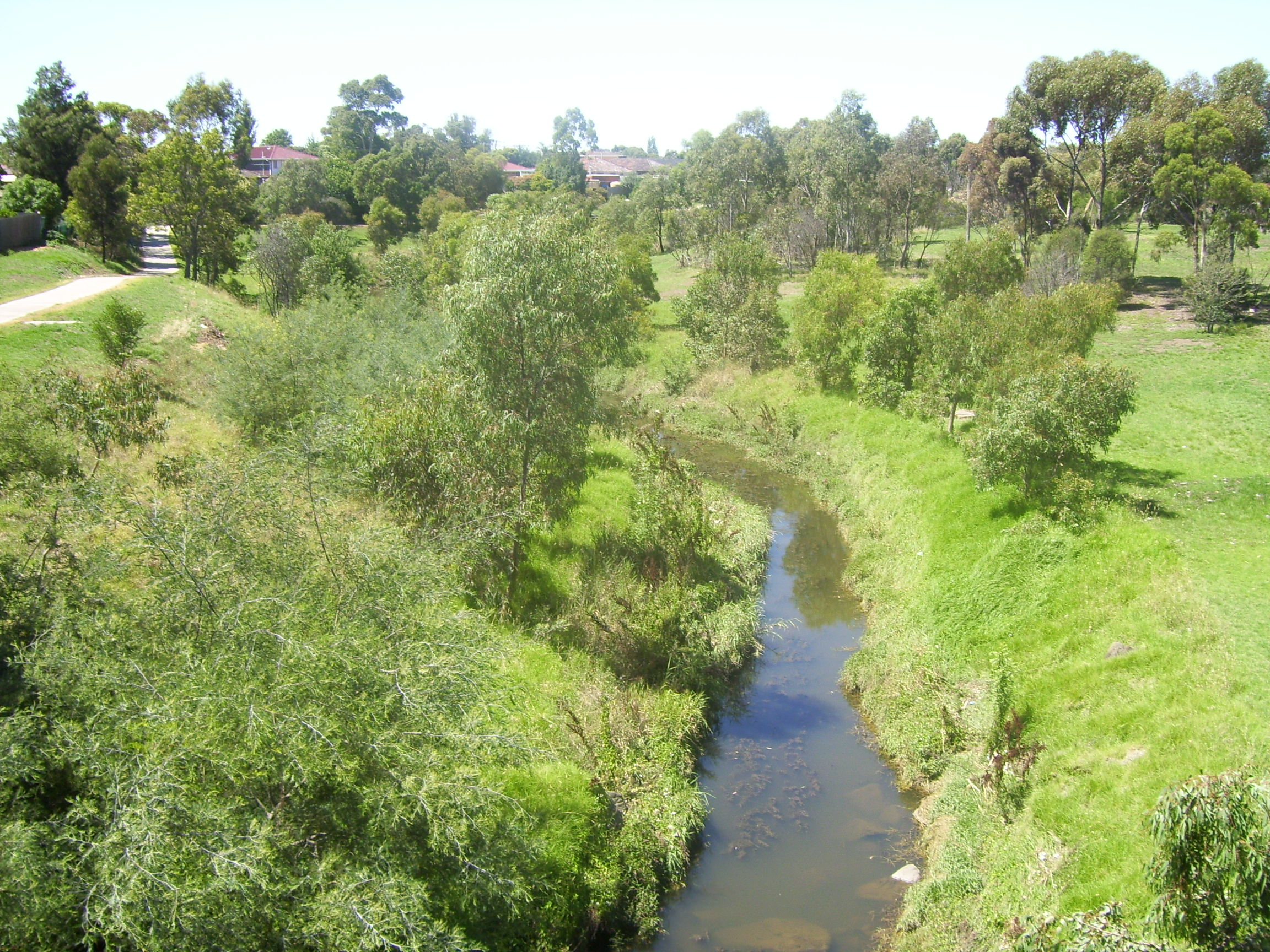
- Kororoit Creek

- Interactive map of Burnside
- Coordinates: 37.753°S 144.754°E
- Country: Australia
- State: Victoria
- City: Melbourne
- LGA: City of Melton
- Location: 20 km (12 mi) W of Melbourne
- Established: 1990s

Government
  - State electorate: Kororoit
  - Federal division: Gorton

Area
  - Total: 4.4 km^{2} (1.7 sq mi)

Population
  - Total: 5,800 (2021 census)
  - Density: 1,318/km^{2} (3,410/sq mi)
- Postcode: 3023
Suburbs around Burnside
Caroline Springs	Taylors Hill	Kings Park
Caroline Springs	Burnside	Albanvale
Ravenhall	Ravenhall	Deer Park

Burnside is a suburb in Melbourne, Victoria, Australia, 20 km (12 mi) west of Melbourne's central business district, located within the City of Melton local government area. Burnside recorded a population of 5,800 at the 2021 census.

== Attractions ==
- Burnside Hub
- Kororoit Creek

Burnside is located beside the upper end of the Kororoit Creek, which still has populations of native reptiles, including tiger snake, eastern blue-tongued lizard, common snakeneck turtle and eastern brown snake.

Kororoit Creek is also home to the Eastern Banjo Frog, common eastern froglet and the endangered Growling grass frog and striped legless lizard.

== Demographics ==
The most common Ancestries were Australian 14%, English 11.8%, Filipino 9.6%, Vietnamese 7.9%, and Maltese 6.8%.

41.2% of people spoke only English at home. Other languages spoken at home included Vietnamese 7.3%, Tagalog 3.9%, Spanish 2.7%, Arabic 2.4% and Filipino 2.3%.

== See also ==
- Kororoit Creek Trail
