= Kororoit Creek =

River in Victoria, Australia

Kororoit
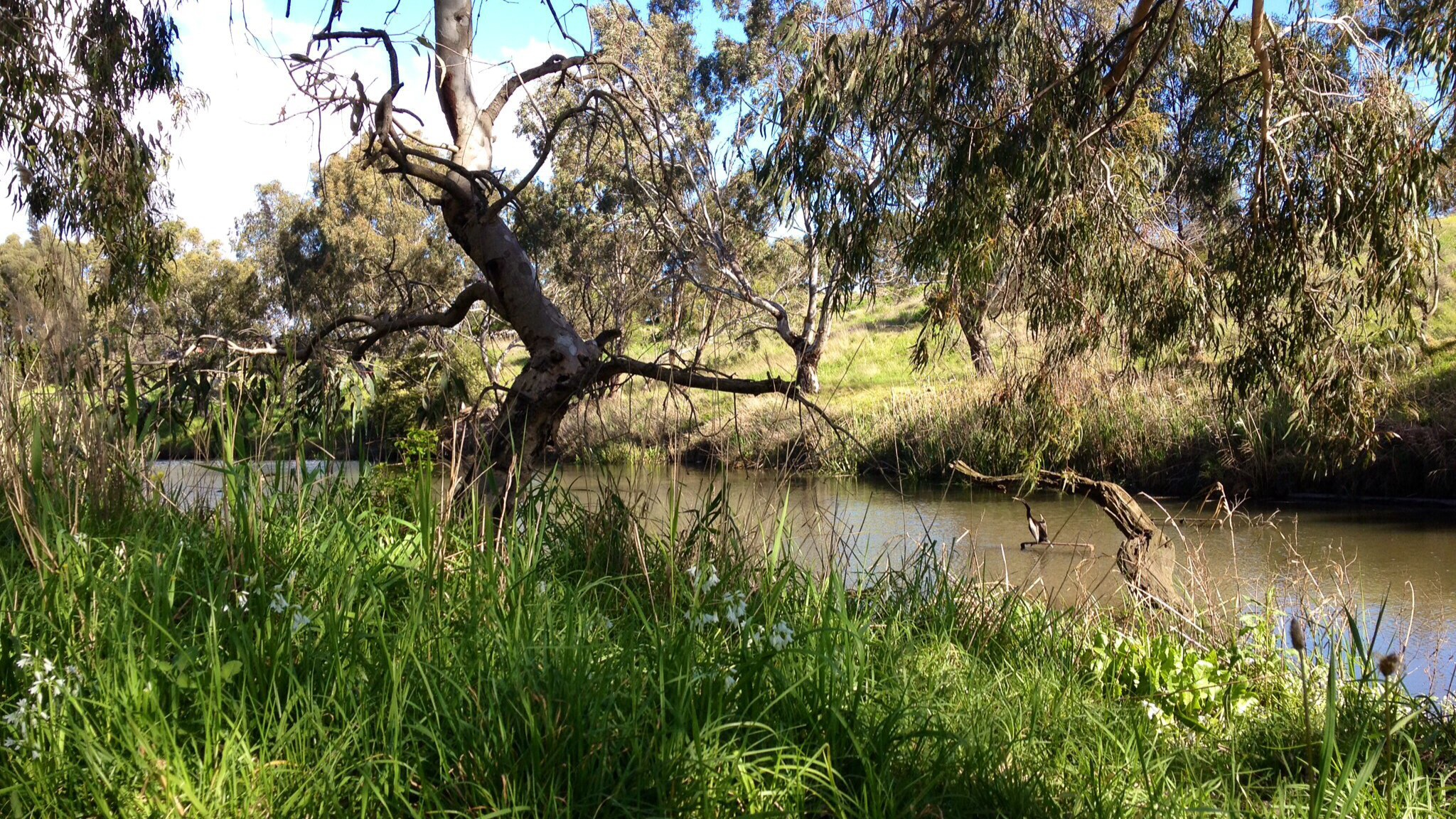
- Kororoit Creek in Albion

- Contour map of the Kororoit Creek and its tributaries, in Greater Melbourne.
- Etymology: Aboriginal (Woiwurrung): creek on western plain

Location
- Country: Australia
- State: Victoria
- Region: Victorian Midlands (IBRA), Greater Melbourne
- Local government areas: Melton, Brimbank
- Suburbs: Rockbank, Caroline Springs, Burnside, Kings Park, Albanvale, Deer Park, Cairnlea, West Sunshine, Ardeer, Albion, Brooklyn, Altona North

Physical characteristics
- Source: Mount Kororoit
  - location: northeast of Melton
  - coordinates: 37°38′21″S 144°39′25″E
  - elevation: 407 m (1,335 ft)
- Mouth: Altona Coastal Park, Port Phillip
  - location: Altona
  - coordinates: 37°51′46″S 144°52′12″E
  - elevation: 0 m (0 ft)
- Length: 52 km (32 mi)

Basin features
- River system: Port Phillip catchment
- Tributaries
  - left: Jones Creek (Cairnlea, Victoria)
- National parks: Altona Coastal Park, Jawbone Marine Sanctuary Park

The Kororoit Creek is a watercourse of the Port Phillip catchment, rising in the outer north western suburbs of Melbourne, in the Australian state of Victoria.

== Location and features ==
The Kororoit Creek rises below Mount Kororoit, northeast of Melton in the north western outer suburbs of Melbourne. The creek's headwaters are north of Sunbury at approximately 400 metres (1,300 ft) above sea level in ordovician geology. The creek flows generally south by east and passes over the volcanic lava plain of western Melbourne to its mouth at sea level, north of Altona and emptying into Altona Bay within Port Phillip. The creek is joined by one minor tributary as it descends approximately 407 metres (1,335 ft) over its 52-kilometre (32 mi) course. At the outlet in Altona Bay, the creek winds its way through the Altona Coastal Park and then the Jawbone Marine Sanctuary Park, where it enters Port Phillip.

From east of Sunbury, the Kororoit Creek makes its way down through many suburbs towards its mouth, including the towns and suburbs of Rockbank, Caroline Springs, Burnside, Kings Park, Albanvale, Deer Park, Cairnlea, West Sunshine, Ardeer, Albion, Brooklyn and Altona North.

The creek is traversed by the Melton Highway, east of Melton; the Western Highway and the Western Ring Road, at Ardeer; and the West Gate Freeway and Federation Trail at Brooklyn. The Kororoit Creek Trail runs along the banks in the lower reaches of the creek. A brick-arched aqueduct carries the Main Outfall Sewer across the creek in Brooklyn.

== History ==
The traditional custodians of the land surrounding the creek are the Wurundjeri people who had hunted, fished mulloway and tiger sharks in rare occasions. and camped along the creek for thousands of years. Aboriginal occupation is evident in the form of many scattered artefacts along the creek. Scar trees, where canoes were carved from the bark of the red gums, are dotted along the creek.

European explorers, James Flemming and Charles Grimes identified the Kororoit Creek in 1803, along with the Maribyrnong River and Yarra River.

The Brooklyn Bluestone Bridge was built over the Kororoit Creek at Brooklyn in the 1870s. The bridge was built using bluestone from the local area and still stands. The bridge was one of the first crossings built for gold diggers heading to the gold fields of Ballarat.

== Etymology ==
Kororoit is an Aboriginal word of the Woiwurrung language that has been used to describe the "creek on (the) western plain"; with an alternate theory that claims the word to mean a "male kangaroo".

== Fauna ==
The creek is home to significant animal species such as the growling grass frog and the striped legless lizard, as well as migratory birds. Remnant native vegetation also survives in some places, including red river gum and white mangroves. Small parks are located on the east and west borders along the creek. Native reptiles, including tiger snake, eastern blue-tongued lizard, common snakeneck turtle and eastern brown snake were often seen along the creek. Unfortunately due to overdevelopment these species are now rarely seen in some areas. Reptiles found along the creek help to maintain the balance of the populations of small mammals such as water rats and mice that thrive along the banks of the creek. Native species of frogs have taken advantage and reclaimed residences in the new (man-made) wetlands and lakes. The eastern banjo frog, common eastern froglet and even the now endangered growling grass frog have been seen and heard in the new wetlands and around Kororoit Creek, particularly in Cairnlea.

Aquatic species found in the creek include the common galaxias, short-finned eel, Australian smelt, tupong, common carp, eastern bluespot goby, and flathead gudgeon.

Bird species found adjacent to the creek include the Australasian darter, little pied cormorant, brown falcon, peregrine falcon, square-tailed kite, dusky moorhen, royal spoonbill, black swan, Pacific black duck, mallard, Australian wood duck, galah, rainbow lorikeet, white-faced heron, Australian white ibis, and wattlebird.

Both the river blackfish and the platypus are native species that are now believed to be extinct along creek's course.

Common introduced species that can be found adjacent to the creek include the red fox and the European rabbit.

== Gallery ==
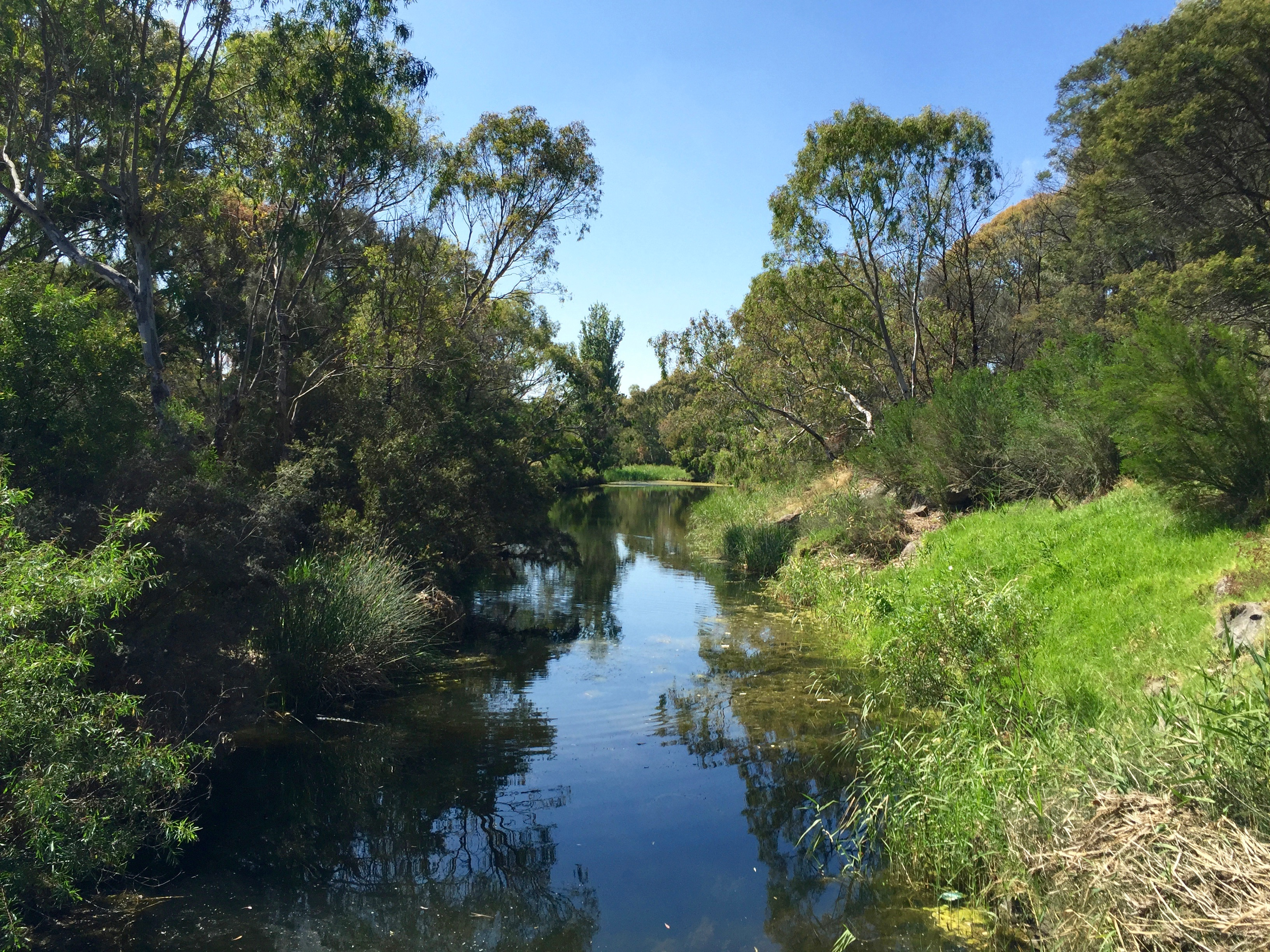
Looking southwards down Kororoit Creek in Sunshine, south of Forrest St.

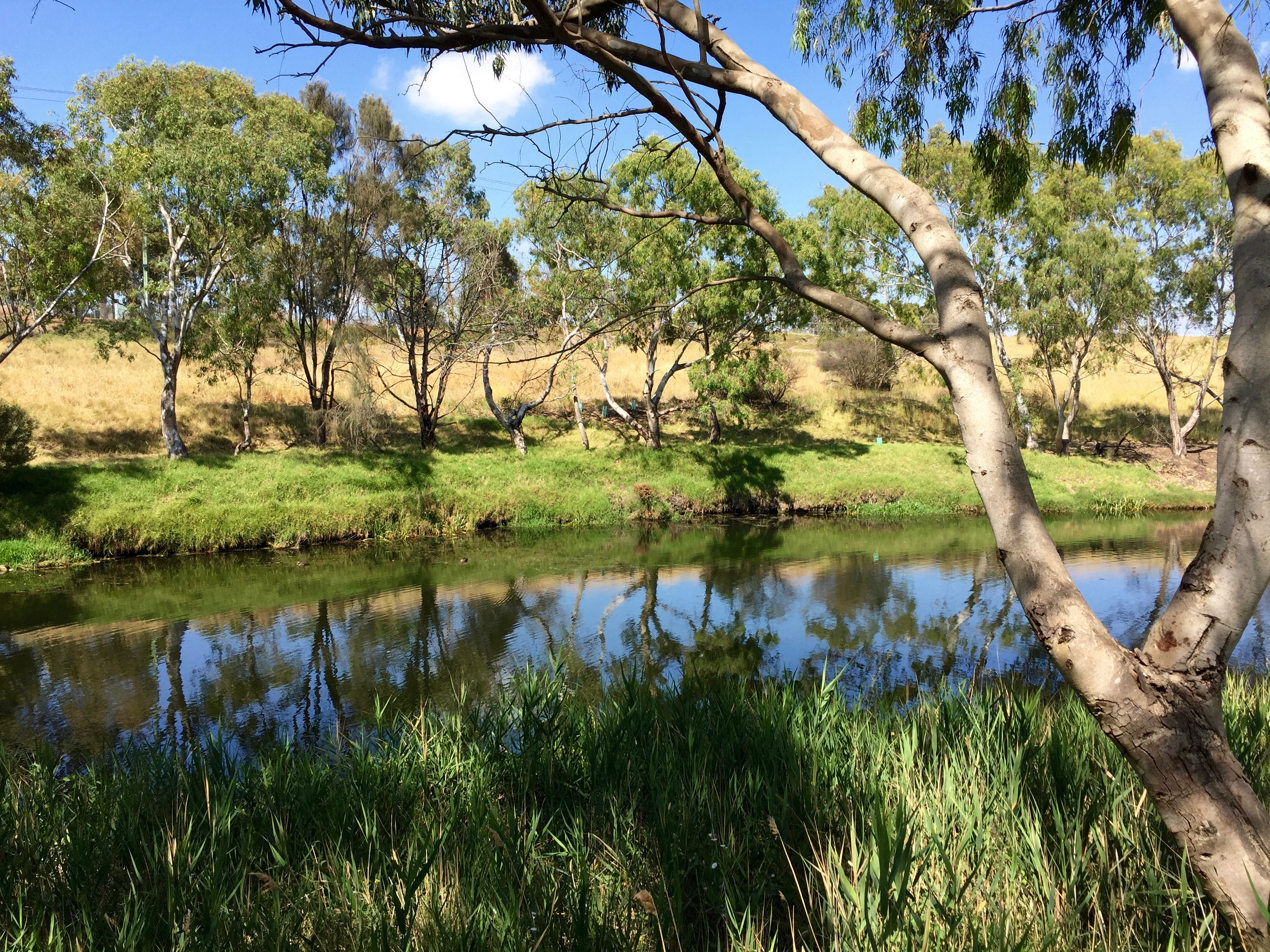
Eastern side of Kororoit Creek near Selwyn Park in Albion, looking southwards.

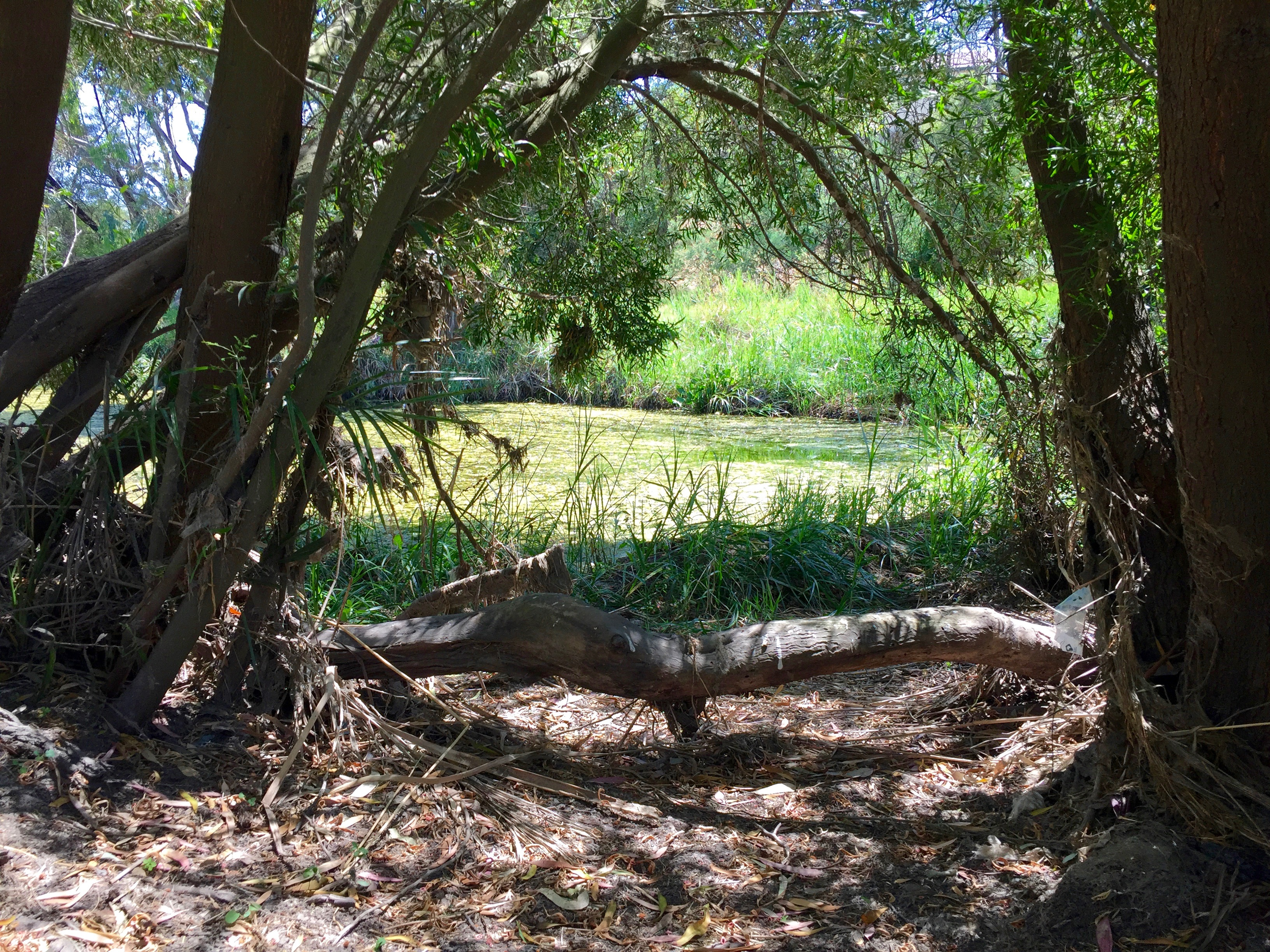
The western riverbank of Kororoit Creek, south of Forrest St.

== See also ==
- Kororoit Creek Trail
