= Division of Fraser (Victoria) =

Australian federal electoral division

Fraser Australian House of Representatives Division
- Interactive map of electorate boundaries from the 2025 federal election
- Created: 2019
- MP: Daniel Mulino
- Party: Labor
- Namesake: Malcolm Fraser
- Electors: 124,233 (2025)
- Area: 98 km^{2} (37.8 sq mi)
- Demographic: Inner metropolitan

The Division of Fraser is an Australian electoral division in the state of Victoria, which was contested for the first time at the 2019 federal election.

== Geography ==
Federal electoral division boundaries in Australia are determined at redistributions by a redistribution committee appointed by the Australian Electoral Commission. Redistributions occur for the boundaries of divisions in a particular state, and they occur every seven years, or sooner if a state's representation entitlement changes or when divisions of a state are malapportioned.

The electorate is located on the west side of the Maribyrnong River south of Keilor down to its confluence with the Yarra. It extends west to parts of Derrimut and Deer Park, and includes most of the local government areas of Maribyrnong and Brimbank.

== History ==
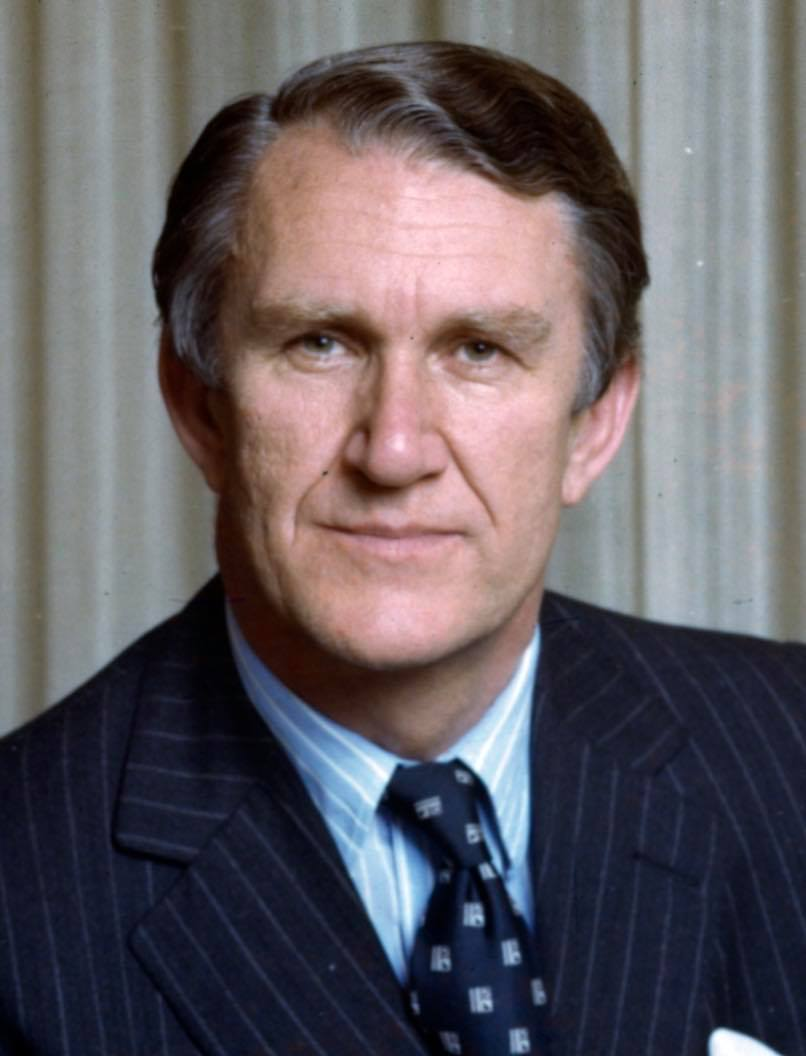
Malcolm Fraser, the division's namesake

The division is named in honour of Malcolm Fraser, who served as Prime Minister of Australia from 1975 to 1983. Fraser had represented the Victorian federal seat of Wannon from 1955 to 1983.

The division of Fraser was created in 2018 after the Australian Electoral Commission oversaw a mandatory redistribution of divisions in Victoria. Fraser was a new seat created to fill Victoria's allotment of 38 divisions, one higher than the number to which the state was previously entitled. The division was originally located in the outer north-west of metropolitan Melbourne and took in the suburbs of Sunshine, Albion, St Albans and Keilor Downs, among others. It was formed from parts of its neighbouring seats of Calwell, Gorton, Gellibrand and Maribyrnong.

In the 2021 redistribution, Fraser was significantly adjusted, moving towards the middle and inner west of Melbourne from the outer suburbs; losing the suburbs of Keilor Downs, Sydenham and several others north of Taylors Road and Green Gully Road to the Division of Gorton, swapping them for parts of Deer Park and Derrimut; and shifting east to acquire the inner west suburbs of Footscray, West Footscray, Kingsville, Seddon and parts of Yarraville from the Division of Gellibrand, and gaining Maidstone and the suburb of Maribyrnong from the Division of Maribyrnong.

The seat was notionally held by the Labor Party on a margin of 20.6%, which made it a very safe seat for the party. It was duly won by Daniel Mulino for Labor in the 2019 federal election, albeit with a 5.61% swing against him. However, the 2021 Federal redistribution in Victoria has increased the notional margin for Labor to 18.1%.

Then-Opposition Leader Bill Shorten had reportedly considered moving to Fraser in the 2019 election but chose to remain in his seat of Maribyrnong until his resignation in 2025.

== Members ==
Image	Member	Party	Term	Notes
	Daniel Mulino (1969–)	Labor	18 May 2019 – present	Previously a member of the Victorian Legislative Council. Incumbent. Currently a minister under Albanese

== Election results ==
2025 Australian federal election: Fraser
Party	Candidate	Votes	%	±%
Labor	Daniel Mulino	45,786	42.60	+0.50
Greens	Huong Truong	27,171	25.28	+6.42
Liberal	Satish Patel	18,125	16.87	−7.64
Victorian Socialists	Jasmine Duff	6,705	6.24	+1.61
One Nation	George Rozario	5,135	4.78	+1.88
Family First	Rob Rancie	4,545	4.23	+4.23
Total formal votes		107,467	96.20	+0.65
Informal votes		4,250	3.80	−0.65
Turnout		111,717	89.96	+4.30
Notional two-party-preferred count
Labor	Daniel Mulino	77,401	72.02	+5.46
Liberal	Satish Patel	30,066	27.98	−5.46
Two-candidate-preferred result
Labor	Daniel Mulino	63,649	59.23	−7.34
Greens	Huong Truong	43,818	40.77	+40.77
Labor hold				
