= Caroline Springs =

- Suburb
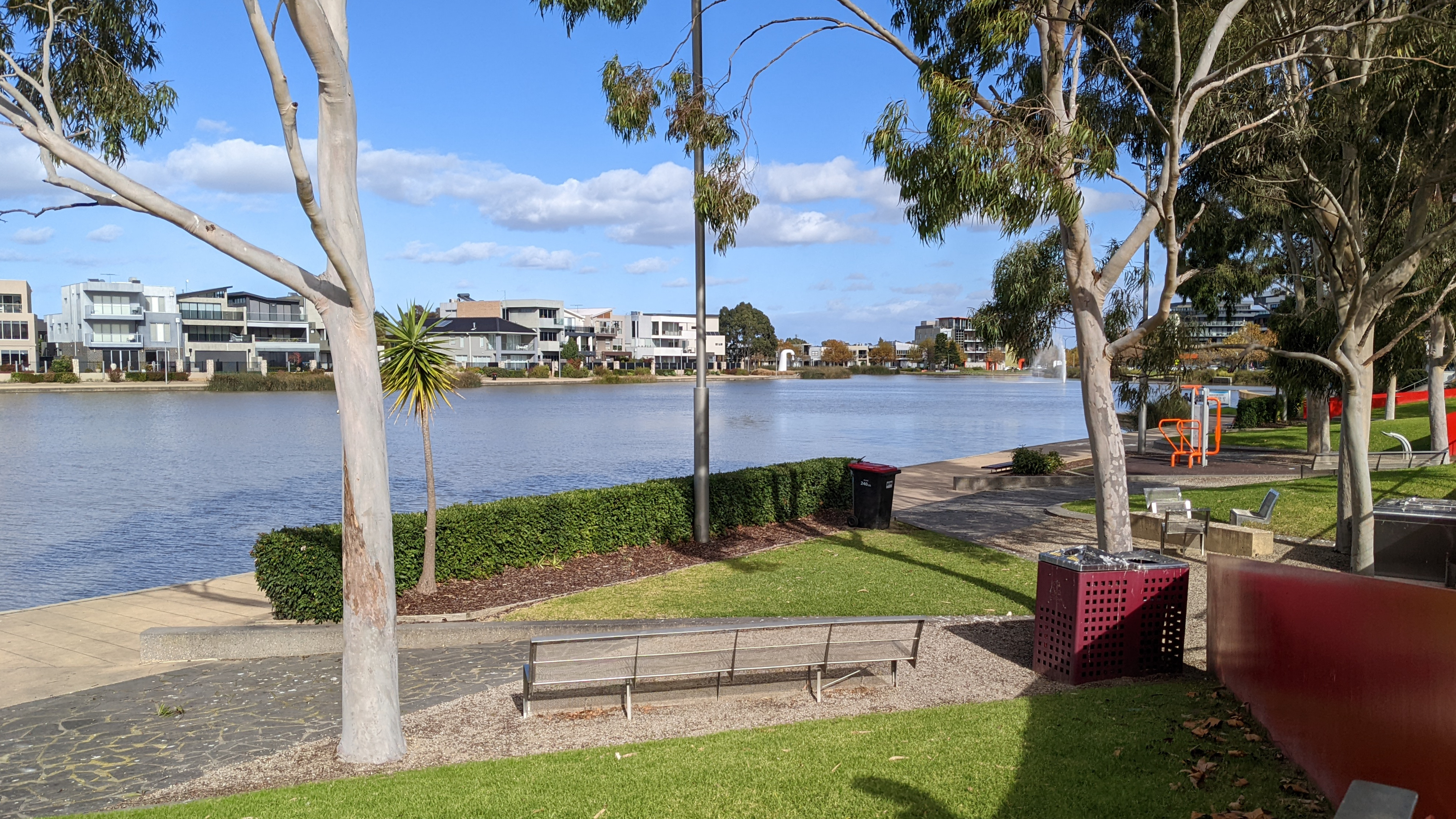
- Lake Caroline in the centre of the suburb.

- Interactive map of Caroline Springs
- Coordinates: 37°44′42″S 144°44′24″E
- Country: Australia
- State: Victoria
- City: Melbourne
- LGA: City of Melton
- Location: 21 km (13 mi) W of Melbourne CBD
- Established: 1999

Government
  - State electorates: Kororoit; Sydenham
  - Federal division: Gorton

Area
  - Total: 4.9 km^{2} (1.9 sq mi)

Population
  - Total: 20,365 (2021 census)
  - Density: 4,160/km^{2} (10,760/sq mi)
- Postcode: 3023
Suburbs around Caroline Springs
Fraser Rise	Taylors Hill	Burnside Heights
Deanside	Caroline Springs	Burnside
Mount Atkinson	Ravenhall	Derrimut

Caroline Springs is a suburb in Melbourne, Victoria, Australia, 21 km (13 mi) west of the Melbourne central business district, located within the City of Melton local government area. Caroline Springs recorded a population of 20,365 at the 2021 census.

Caroline Springs is named after the 19th-century philanthropist Caroline Chisholm who built shelters for people emigrating through the surrounding district to the goldfields.

The Caroline Springs Post Office opened on 8 August 2005.

== Development ==
Caroline Springs was developed on greenfield land by Delfin in partnership with George Gilbertson and other original landowners. It quickly became one of Melbourne's fastest growing suburbs. Between initial construction in 1997 and the final land sales in 2011, it grew from under 100 to over 20,000 residents.

Centrally located, just north of Kororoit Creek, is the town centre and main retail hub, known as CS Square. This shopping centre is complimented by a library, a recreational centre, two churches, and a man-made lake known as Lake Caroline. Originally, a campus of Mowbray College was also situated in the town centre, but since its closure, it has been replaced with other schools.

In 2006, Caroline Springs won Australia’s Best Masterplanned Community Award for its successful blend of homes, playgrounds, water features, schools, shops, and greenery.

A $40 million five-star hotel was opened by the Mercure Hotels group on the edge of Lake Caroline in August 2009. In May 2022, it was acquired by the Oscars Group, who now operate the hotel and entertainment complex under the name WestWaters.

On 4 April 2019, an extension of CS Square was opened. The expansion made way for a new Woolworths supermarket, multiple new retail stores and an expanded car park.

A further expansion named CS Hub opened on 1 January 2023, bringing the total number of retailers to over 80.

== Demographics ==
In the 2021 census, there were 20,365 people in Caroline Springs.

- The most common ancestries were Australian 15.5%, English 14.0%, Maltese 7.5%, Indian 7.3%, and Filipino 7.2%.
- 54.7% of people were born in Australia. The next most common countries of birth were India 5.9%, Philippines 4.9%, Vietnam 3.2%, and Iraq 2.0%.
- English was the only language used at home by 49.7% of people. Other languages spoken at home included Vietnamese 4.9%, Arabic 2.8%, Tagalog 2.6%, and Punjabi 2.6%.
- The most common responses for religion were Catholic 32.4%, No Religion 21.2%, Islam 7.6% and Eastern Orthodox 5.7%.

== Flora and fauna ==
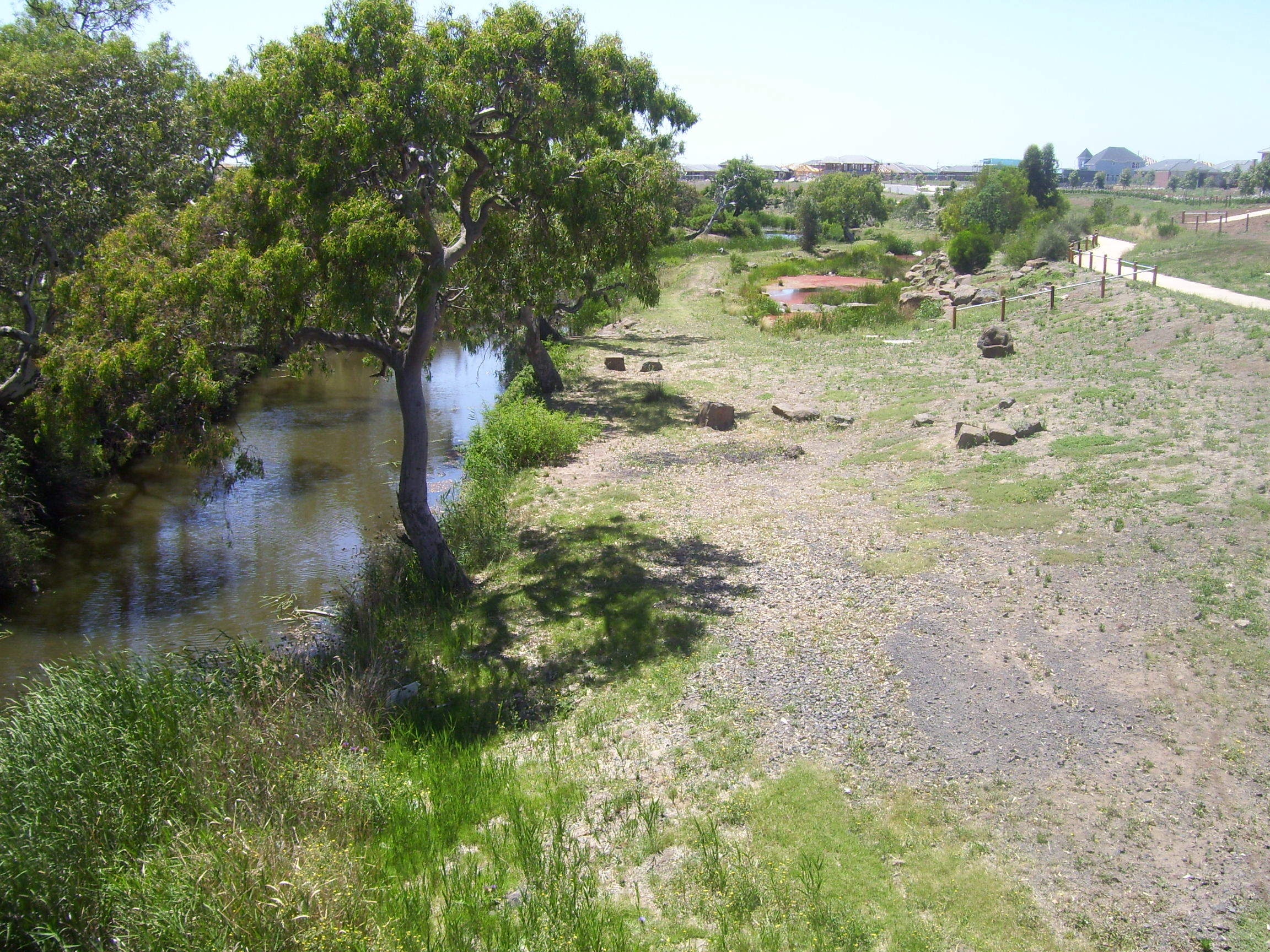
Kororoit Creek

Kororoit Creek runs through the centre of the suburb. The creek has been home to healthy populations of native animals for thousands of years, including the tiger snake, the eastern blue-tongued lizard, the common snakeneck turtle, the eastern brown snake and kangaroos. Development over the past 30 years has displaced many of these species, and they are now rarely seen.

Due to artificial development of large lakes and wetland environments, species of frogs have reclaimed the area. The common eastern froglet, the eastern banjo frog and even the now endangered growling grass frog have been seen and heard in both Kororoit Creek and many of the lakes in Caroline Springs. Many species of birds are also returning to the creeks and lakes. Steel board walks and a 4m viewing platform have been constructed in Caroline Springs to allow locals to see these bird and frog species.

It is expected that the Kororoit Creek Trail will eventually be linked up to Caroline Springs providing cyclists with an off-road path all the way to Sunshine and then Melbourne.

== Education ==
=== Public Schools ===
- Creekside College (P-9)
- Brookside College (P-9)
- Lakeview Senior College (10-12)
- Springside Primary School

=== Independent Schools ===
- Australian International Academy Caroline Springs (P-12)
- Catholic Regional College Caroline Springs (7-10)
- Christ the Priest Catholic Primary School
- Southern Cross Grammar (P-12)
- St George Preca Primary School

== Transport ==
=== Road ===
Despite the introduction of a train station and bus lines, Caroline Springs remains a car-dependent community. It was planned under the concepts of street hierarchy and has just one main arterial, being Caroline Springs Boulevard. In the south, this feeds into both the Deer Park Bypass and the Western Highway, connecting Caroline Springs to Melbourne via either the Western Ring Road or the Princes Highway. In the north, this arterial becomes Gourlay Road, and continues into Taylors Hill.

=== Bus ===
Eight bus routes service Caroline Springs:

- 215 : Highpoint Shopping Centre – Caroline Springs via Ballarat Road. Operated by Kinetic Melbourne.
- 418 : St Albans Station – Caroline Springs via Keilor Plains Station. Operated by CDC Melbourne.
- 426 : Sunshine Station – Caroline Springs. Operated by Kinetic Melbourne.
- 456 : Melton – Sunshine Station via Caroline Springs. Operated by Transit Systems Victoria.
- 460 : Watergardens Station – Caroline Springs Station via Caroline Springs Town Centre. Operated by CDC Melbourne.
- 462 : Watergardens Station – Caroline Springs Station via Caroline Springs Square SC. Operated by CDC Melbourne.
- 463 : Watergardens Station – Caroline Springs. Operated by CDC Melbourne.
- Night Bus 943 : Watergardens Station – Melton via Caroline Springs (operates Friday and Saturday nights only). Operated by Transit Systems Victoria.

=== Train ===
Caroline Springs railway station, opened in 2017 as part of the 2008 Victorian Transport Plan, is a V/Line operated station on the Ararat and Ballarat lines. The station is not actually in Caroline Springs, and is sited in the adjacent Ravenhall.

== Sport ==
Caroline Springs is currently represented in a number of local and regional sports.

Caroline Springs Hockey Club is one of the newest members in the local sports community. Founded in 2016, "The Springers" compete in the Hockey Victoria Pennant and Metro competitions.
