= Point Cook =

- Suburb
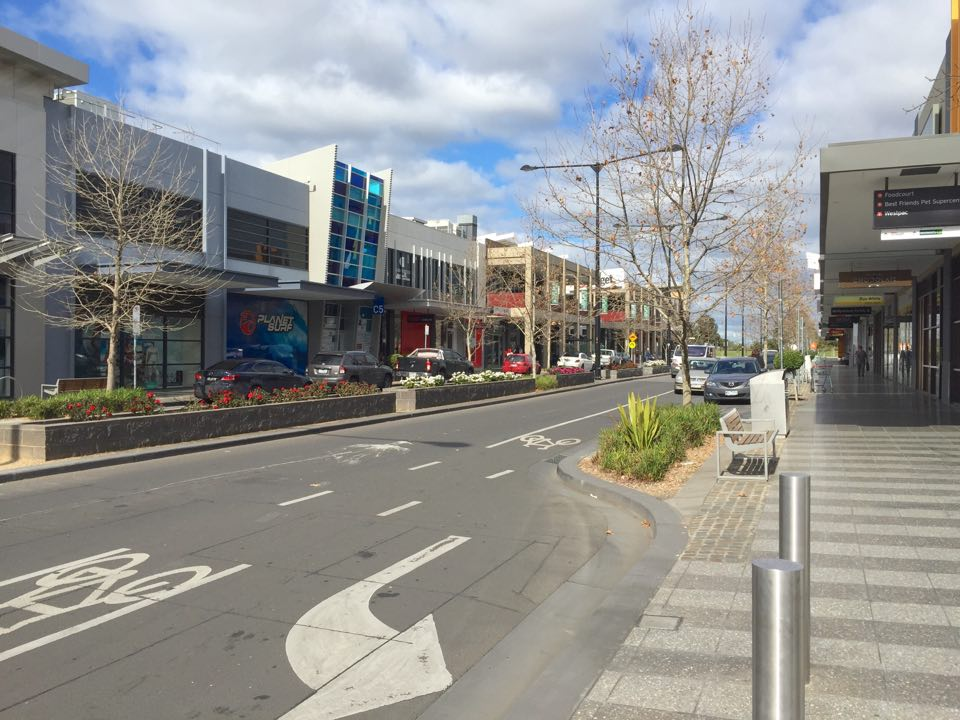
- Main Street, Point Cook

- Interactive map of Point Cook
- Coordinates: 37.909°S 144.752°E
- Country: Australia
- State: Victoria
- City: Melbourne
- LGA: City of Wyndham
- Location: 22 km (14 mi) from Melbourne

Government
  - State electorate: Point Cook
  - Federal divisions: Gellibrand; Lalor

Area
  - Total: 38.76 km^{2} (14.97 sq mi)
- Elevation: 12 m (39 ft)

Population
  - Total: 66,781 (2021 census)
  - Density: 1,722.94/km^{2} (4,462.4/sq mi)
- Postcode: 3030
Suburbs around Point Cook
Hoppers Crossing	Williams Landing	Seabrook
Werribee	Point Cook	Port Phillip
Werribee South	Port Phillip	Port Phillip

Point Cook is a suburb in Melbourne, Victoria, Australia, 22 km (14 mi) south-west of Melbourne's Central Business District, located within the City of Wyndham local government area. Point Cook recorded a population of 66,781 at the 2021 census, making it the most populated suburb in Australia.

Point Cook is the home of RAAF Base Point Cook, the birthplace of the Royal Australian Air Force, and is the current home of the RAAF Museum. Point Cook is also home to many playgrounds and parks/public spaces. The wetlands of the Point Cook Coastal Park form part of the Cheetham and Altona Important Bird Area.

The major development of the suburb began in the late 1990s. The population of Point Cook has been growing rapidly since 2001 when the population was 1,737. At the 2016 census, Point Cook's population was 49,929, and had risen to 66,781 by 2021.

== History ==
=== Early settlers ===
Point Cook was originally spelled Point Cooke, and named in 1836. Almost all references dropped the "e"; however, in the early 2000s the point itself was officially renamed "Point Cooke". Point Cook was named after John M. Cooke, mate of His Majesty's vessel Rattlesnake. Commanded by Captain Hobson, the ship charted part of the Port Phillip Bay in 1836.

William Drayton Taylor leased the land around Point Cook promontory in 1849. The following year in 1850 Taylor transferred his licence to Alexander Irvine. By March 1852, a six-room weatherboard cottage had been erected.

In 1853 the pastoralist Thomas Chirnside added the farmlands of Point Cook to his holdings. He built the famous Point Cook Homestead of twenty-five rooms in 1857. Initially Point Cook was an important segment of the expanding pastoral empire established by Thomas and his brother Andrew. As their extensive land holdings were developed substantial homesteads were later constructed at Werribee Park, Carranballac, Mount William and Curnong.

Due to the Chirnside brothers' deep interest in hunting, deer and foxes were introduced to Point Cook in the 1850s. As early as 1859 members of the Melbourne Hunt Club and the Geelong & District Hunt Club were invited to hunt at Point Cook. In the early 1860s Thomas Chirnside imported valuable horses for the breeding at Point Cook. The property was said to have three racetracks. The Chirnside's became one of Victoria's prominent pastoral families, entertaining the colonial gentry and organising sporting functions for their guests at Point Cook.

In 1873 the Chirnside brothers began construction of the elaborate mansion at Werribee Park. By 1877 the Werribee Park Mansion had been completed and it largely displaced the Point Cook Homestead as their families' focus.

=== Early 20th century ===
In 1912 the Federal Government purchased a large section of Point Cook with a vision to establish the Australian Flying Corps (AFC). Due to the success of the AFC in the First World War, the AFC was renamed the Royal Australian Air Force (RAAF) and this led to the eventual renaming of the AFC base at Point Cook to RAAF Base Point Cook. Point Cook remained the RAAF's only base until 1925 when RAAF Base Richmond and the nearby RAAF Base Laverton were built. Point Cook is considered the birthplace and the spiritual home of the RAAF. Today the RAAF Base Point Cook is the home of the RAAF College including Officers Training School (OTS) and the RAAF Museum.

In 1920 the Chirnside family sold the remainder of the Point Cook property to Sydney Dalrymple. This ended nearly 70 years of the Chirnside family's ownership of Point Cook. Four years later in 1924 Dalrymple sold the northern part of the Point Cook land to Cheetham Salt Pty Ltd for salt recovery lagoons.

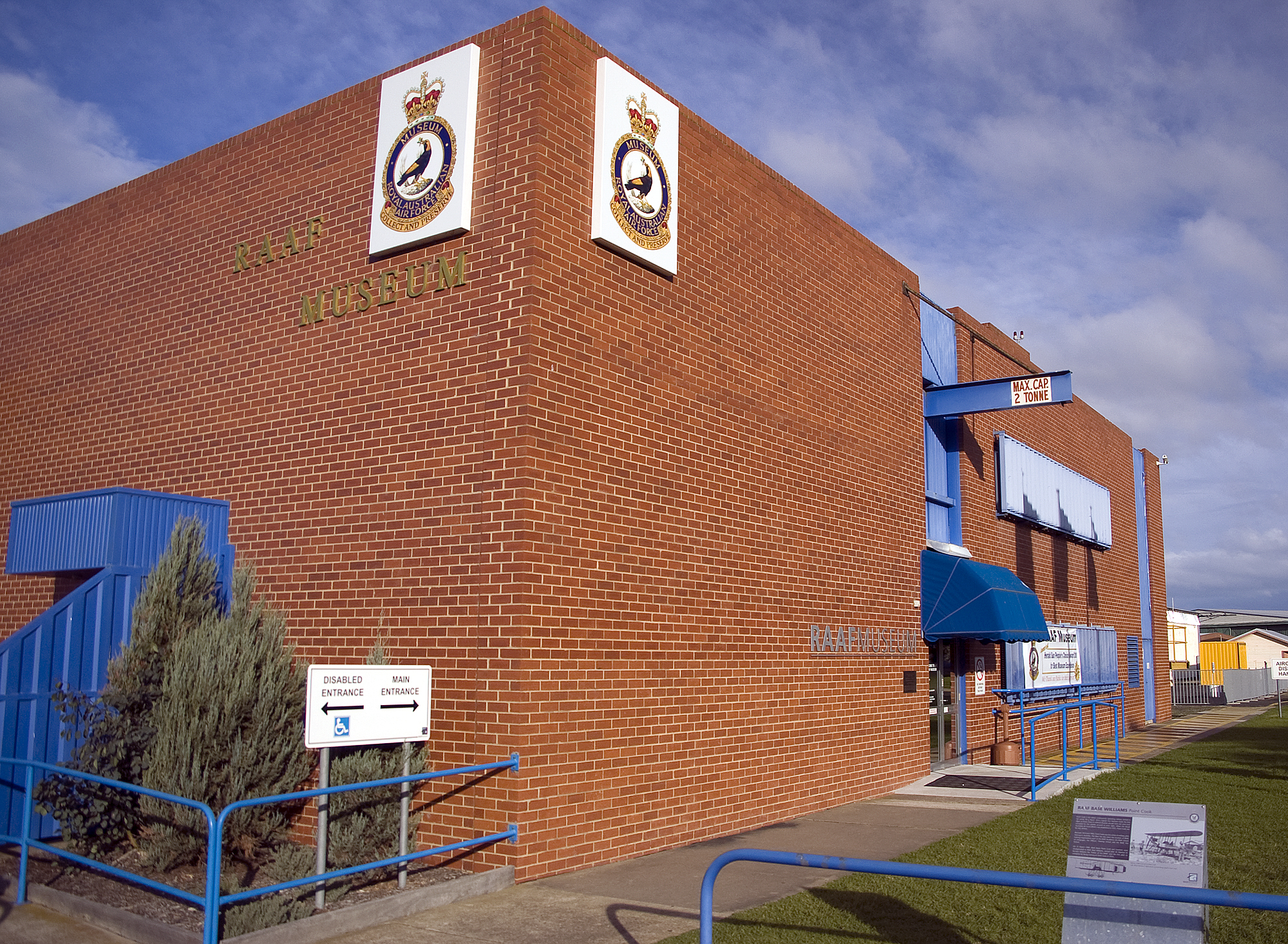
RAAF Museum – Point Cook

Point Cook Post Office opened in 1926, was renamed Point Cook R.A.A.F. Post Office in 1940, and closed in 1993. A new Point Cook office opened in 2005 subsequent to suburban development in the area.

Cheetham Salt established a series of ponds in the 1920s where sea water was fed into the shallow ponds and allowed to evaporate. Dried salt was then harvested from the floor of the lagoons. This operation continued until the early 1990s, when the site was purchased by the Victorian Government. The more environmentally important bayside part of the original saltworks now comprises Cheetham Wetlands which make up the migratory bird habitat and conservation area that is there today. The higher, western section is being developed privately by various housing estates, such as Sanctuary Lakes that are there today. In 1948 Point Cook hosted the Australian Grand Prix, which was held at the Point Cook RAAF Base. The race was won by Frank Pratt driving a BMW 328.

=== Today ===
In 1996, Point Cook was basically a rural community, with the RAAF (Royal Australian Air Force) Base. Point Cook's population in 1996 was approximately 580, of whom 552 lived on the RAAF base. By 2001, Point Cook's population had increased to 1,737, and by August 2006 the population of Point Cook was 14,162 as per the 2006 Australian Census. Today Point Cook is one of the major growth regions in Melbourne's western suburbs.

At the 2011 Census, Point Cook recorded a population of 32,413 and it was originally estimated in 2006 that the population would be 41,474 by 2016. The 2016 Census revealed that the actual population in June 2016 was much higher at 49,929.

During the 2016 Census, it was found there were 13,593 families living in Point Cook, with an average of 1.1 child per family. 50.1% of Point Cook's population were males, 49.9% being females.

In Point Cook, 48.4% of people were born in Australia. The most common countries of birth were India 9.1%, China 6.4%, New Zealand 4.0%, United Kingdom 3.2% and Philippines 2.1%. 51.1% of people only spoke English at home. Other languages spoken at home included Mandarin 8.4%, Hindi 4.4%, Cantonese 2.3%, Indonesian 1.6% and Punjabi 1.6%. The most common responses for religion in Point Cook were No Religion 27.7%, Catholic 23.7% and Hinduism 10.0%.

At the time of the 2021 Census, Point Cook was found to be the most multicultural suburb in Australia. The suburb's population hail from 86 countries with at least 20 residents from each of those countries. About 70 per cent of residents have both parents born overseas, and it also has the largest number of different languages spoken at home.

== Facilities ==
=== Internet ===
During 2018, much of Point Cook was connected to the National Broadband Network. Most homes are connected to the NBN via FTTC. Fibre to the Curb allows network speeds of up to 100 M/bits. However, NBNCo says future upgrades to FTTC may allow network speeds of up to 1 G/bit in the coming years.

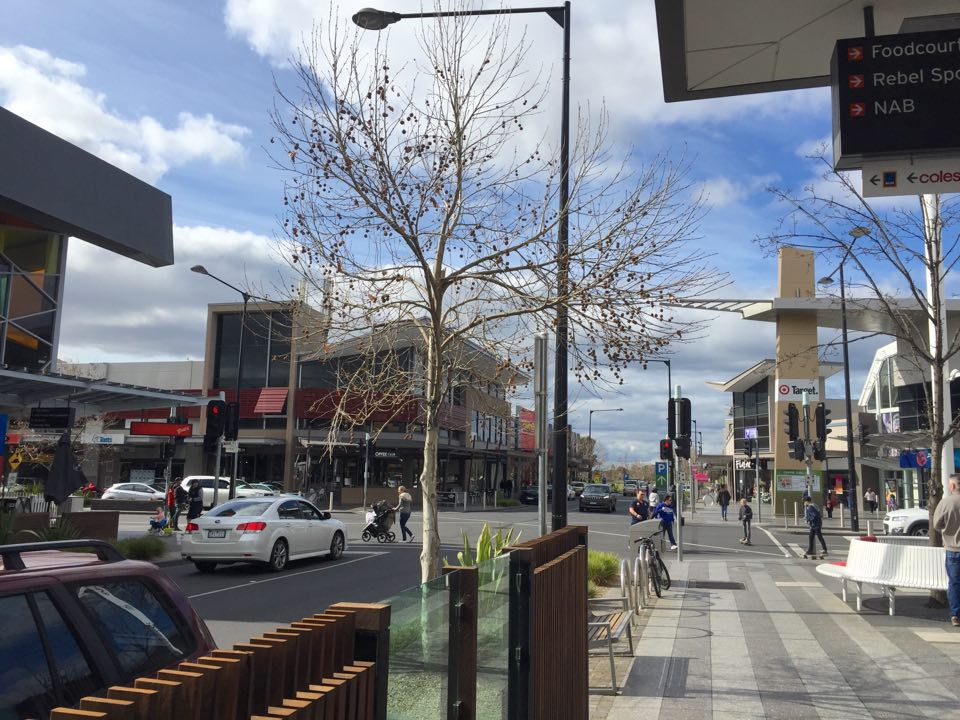
Murnong Street, Point Cook Town Centre

=== Education ===
Schools in the Suburb of Point Cook:

- Alamanda K-9 College
- Carranballac College, Prep – Year 9 College, Jamieson Way Campus
- Carranballac College, Prep – Year 9 College, Boardwalk Campus
- Emmanuel College: Notre Dame Campus (Co-educational Catholic Secondary School Years 7–12)
- Featherbrook College P-9
- Lumen Christi Catholic Point Cook Primary School
- Point Cook College P-9 (formerly Point Cook Primary School)
- Point Cook Senior Secondary College (Years 10–12)
- Saltwater P-9 College
- Stella Maris Catholic Primary School
- St Mary's Catholic Primary School
- Homestead Senior Secondary College (Years 10–12)

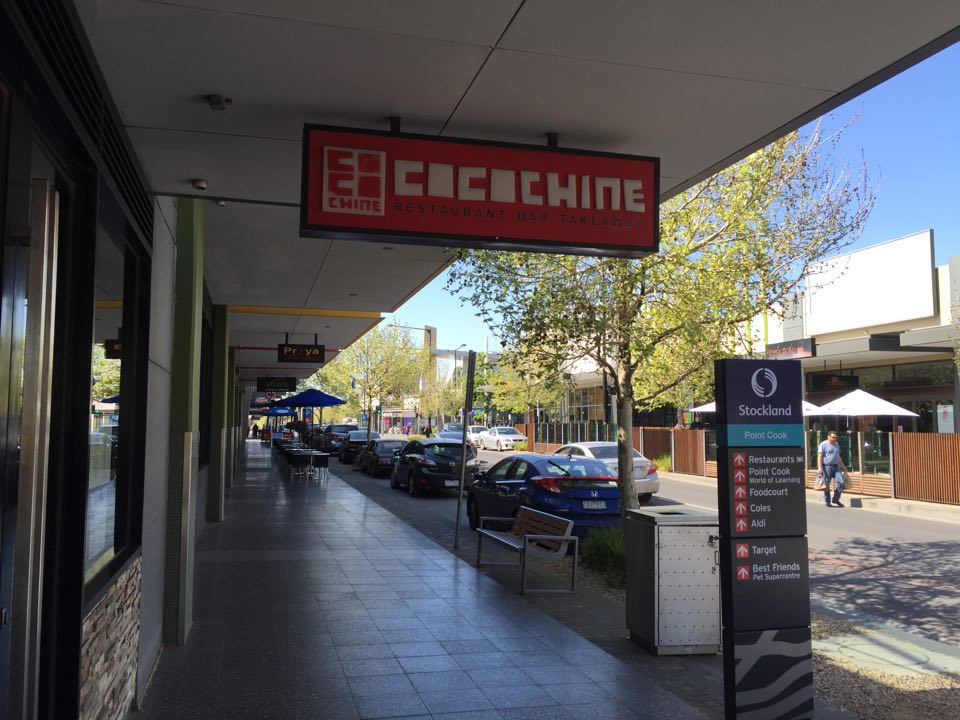
Point Cook Town Centre has restaurant and cafés

=== RAAF Base ===
The RAAF base was established in March 1913 and was used as a flying training school until 1992. The base contains a museum for visitors; most of what is left are prohibited and restricted areas. The RAAF Point Cook Base contains a horizon tank, one of only three in the world. It was used in the television series Moby Dick and Noah's Ark.

=== Shopping ===
The Point Cook Town Centre is located at the corner of Dunnings Road and Boardwalk Boulevard, with the development including a main street retail and commercial town centre, up to 135 speciality shops, as well as Coles, Target, Woolworths, Growers Fresh, Pharmacy Select and The Reject Shop outlets. There is also a food court which seats over 400 people. Stage 1 had a grand opening on 21 August 2008, with Stage 2 opening at the end of November 2009. In 2010 Victoria's largest Dan Murphy's store and Vast Furniture store opened. In August 2015 a $25 million redevelopment of the centre was completed. This included the opening of a 4000 square metre Woolworths and makes the shopping centre the only one in the area to offer three supermarkets.

Sanctuary Lakes Shopping Centre is another shopping centre in Point Cook, undergoing a major revamp which was revealed to the public on Thursday 6 September 2012. Kmart and Aldi were added to the centre, as well as an additional 30 retailers. Four-hundred new car parks and food court will also be added to Sanctuary Lakes Shopping Centre.

see also Williams Landing

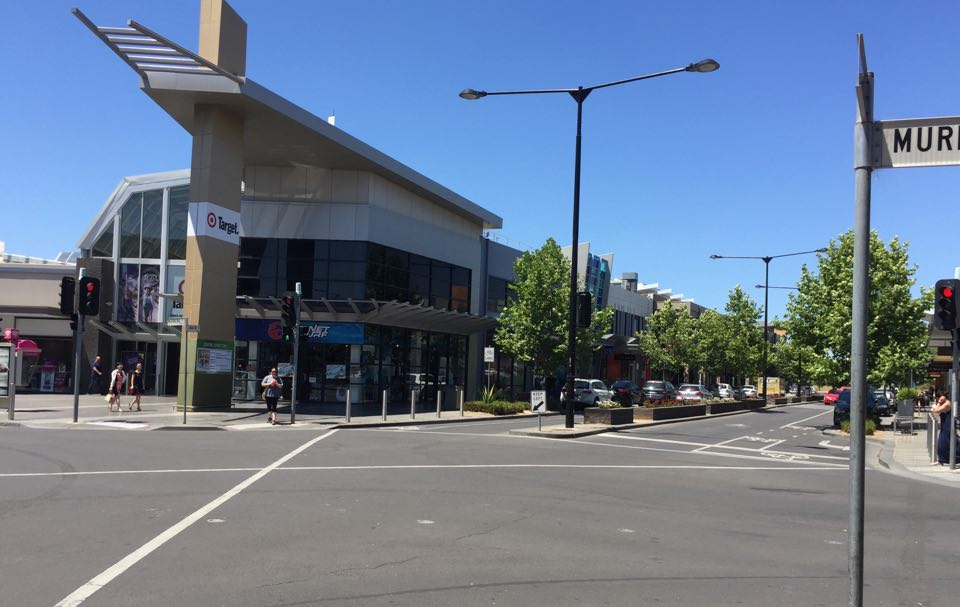
Point Cook Town Centre

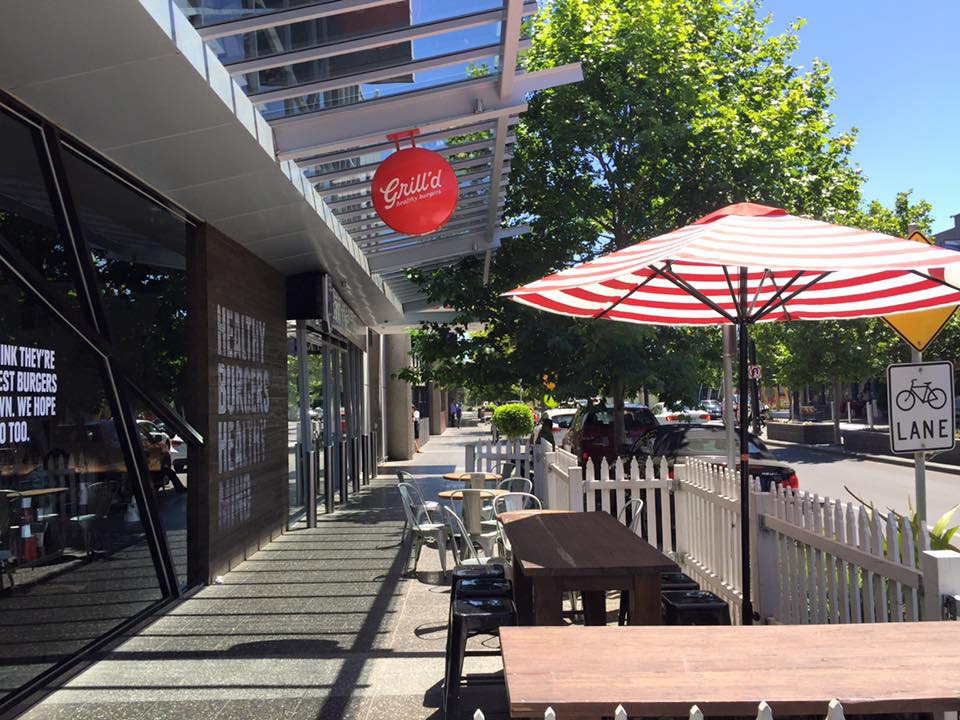
Alfresco Dining in Point Cook

=== Cafes and restaurants ===
Point Cook has an active café and restaurant culture that reflects the diversity of greater Melbourne. There are over 50 restaurants and cafes in Point Cook offering cuisines including Italian, Indian, Malaysian, Chinese, Vietnamese, Korean, Thai, Japanese, Pakistani, Pan Asian, Spanish, American, Mexican, Pub Food, Buffet, Vegetarian, Vegan and modern Australian. These venues are spread across the area, with several concentrated in location such as the Point Cook Town Centre, Featherbrook Shopping Centre, Soho Village, Sanctuary Lakes Shopping Centre, Tribeca Village and across the freeway from Williams Landing railway station.

There is also a large range of takeaway food places which offer an equally wide range of cuisines.

== Transport ==
Point Cook is located to the south of the Princes Freeway, and is served by the Point Cook Road and Forsyth Road exits. A Palmers Road off-ramp opened in March 2008, as an alternate route onto the freeway from Point Cook Road. A new full diamond freeway exit on the Princes Freeway at Sneydes Road was completed, giving Point Cook residents a fourth Freeway interchange and a direct connection into the planned East Werribee Employment Precinct.

The nearest railway station is Williams Landing railway station which was opened on 30 April 2013. Some other stations also close by are Laverton and Aircraft, both on the Werribee line.

The following bus routes also service the area:

- 494 Williams Landing railway station – Point Cook South via Dunnings Road, Sommersby Road and Alamanda Boulevard, Point Cook (every day). Operated by CDC Melbourne
- 495 Williams Landing railway station – Point Cook South via Dunnings Road, Boardwalk Bvd and Featherbrook Estate, Point Cook (every day). Operated by CDC Melbourne
- 496 Laverton – Sanctuary Lakes Shopping Centre via Central Av and Point Cook Rd, Point Cook (every day). Operated by CDC Melbourne
- 497 Williams Landing railway station – Saltwater Coast Estate via Dunnings Rd, Point Cook Rd and Saltwater Prom, Point Cook (every day). Operated by CDC Melbourne
- 498 Laverton railway station - Hoppers Crossing Station via Central Av, Point Cook Rd, Dunnings Rd, Sneydes Rd and Hoppers Ln. (every day). Operated by CDC Melbourne

== Sporting and social clubs ==
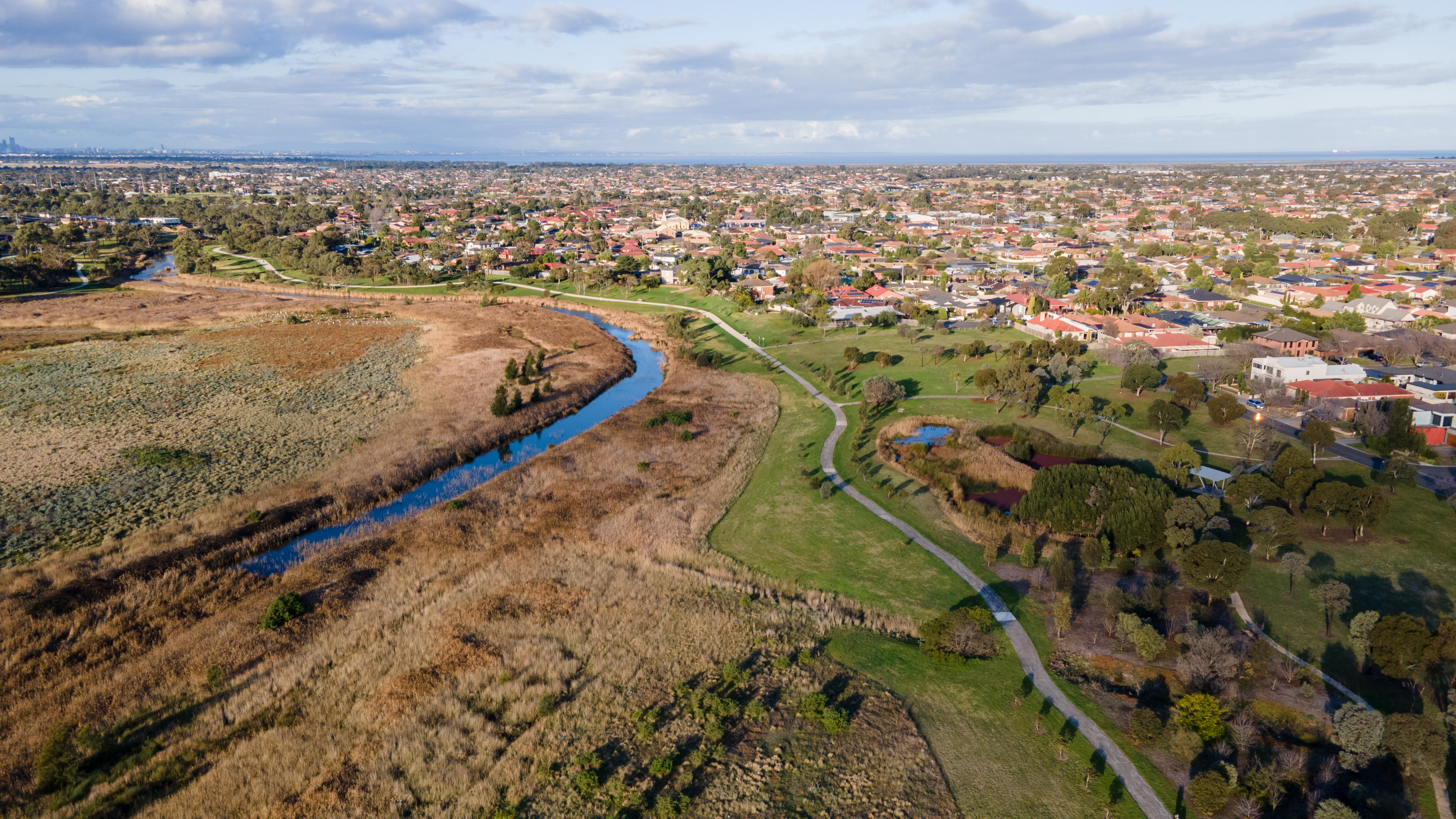
Skeleton Creek in scrubland in Point Cook

- Point Cook Action Group has been established to advocate on behalf of residents of Point Cook, with the objective of gaining quality facilities and infrastructure required to maintain and improve the standard and quality of living in the Point Cook area.
- Point Cook Motorcycle Club PCMC is an on-road social club, meeting at the Waterstone Cafe in Sanctuary Lakes on Sunday mornings for social rides. All makes style and ages.
- Point Cook Football Club (PCFC)
- Sanctuary Lakes Cricket Club (SLCC) is the club of choice for competitive cricket in Point Cook & is the only home grown cricket club in Point Cook.
- Saltwater Pirates Cricket Club (SPCC)
- Point Cook Centrals Sporting Club (PCCSC) the club has teams in Aussie Rules and Netball
- West Point Soccer Club (WPSC)
- Golfers play at the course of the Sanctuary Lakes Club on Point Cook Road.

== Tourism ==
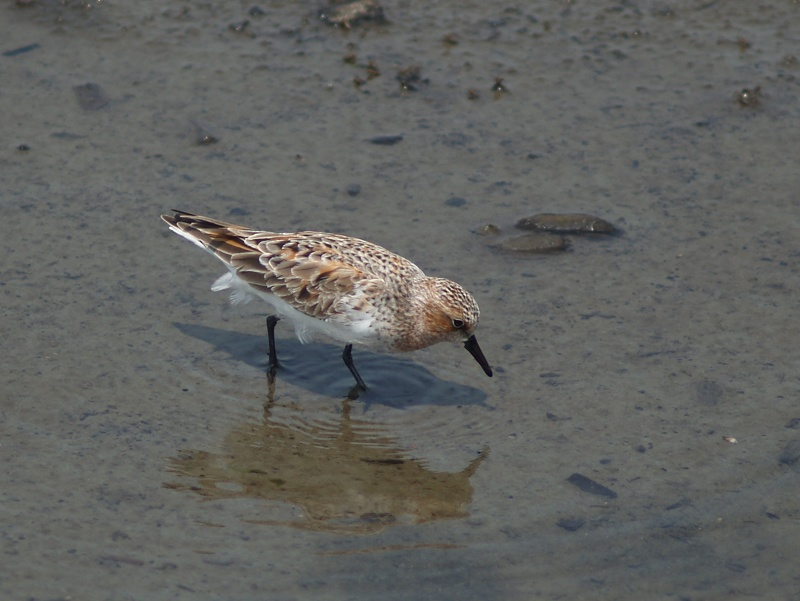
A red-necked stint

Tourist attractions in Point Cook include:

- Point Cook Homestead
- Point Cook Coastal Park
- Point Cook RAAF Museum

Tourist attractions neighbouring Point Cook include:

- Werribee Open Range Zoo
- Werribee Park Mansion

== Notable residents ==
=== Music ===
- Anthony Callea – Television personality and singer; spent his teenage and early adult years with his parents in Point Cook.

=== Sport ===
- Jordan Bos – Current footballer for Feyenoord and Socceroos international; grew up in Point Cook and attended Emmanuel College.
- Archie Thompson – Retired footballer who represented the Socceroos 54 times; lived in the Sanctuary Lakes area of Point Cook, while at Melbourne Victory.

=== TV and Radio ===
- Dave Williams – Radio presenter for Triple M
- Rob McLennan - Radio presenter and journalist, 95.5 K-rock, 93.9 Bay FM, Australian Radio Network
