= Mokanger =

Historic homestead in Victoria, Australia

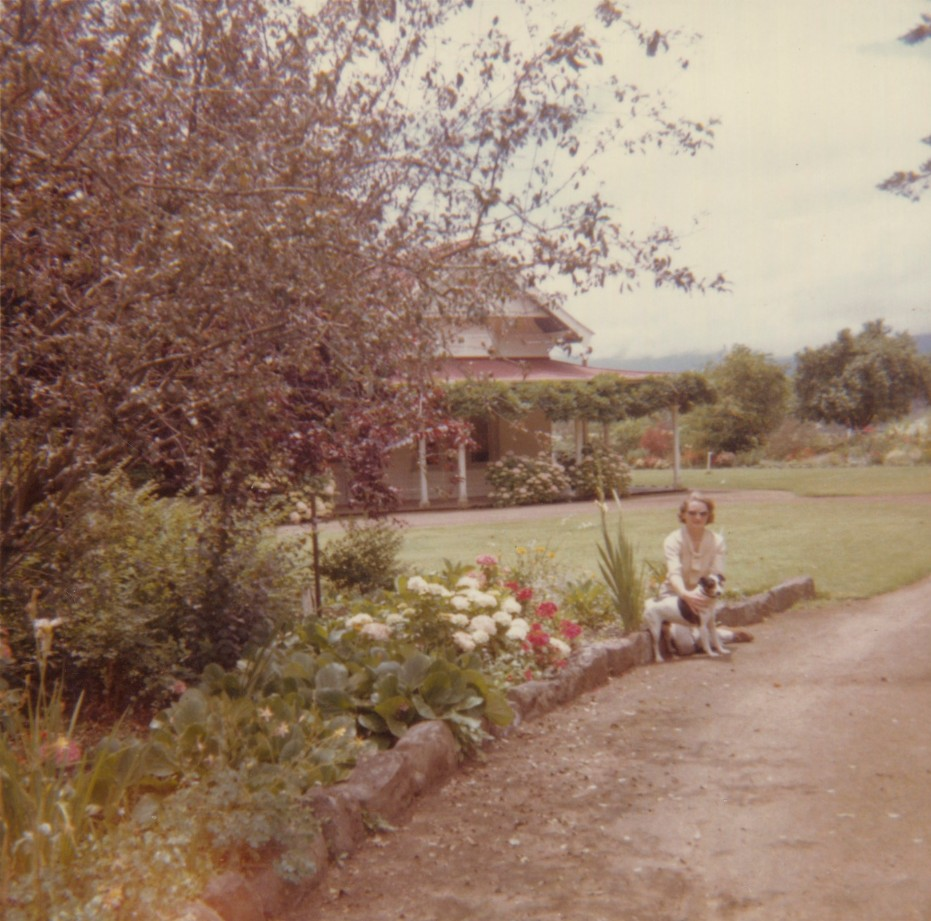
- Mokanger Homestead, 1930

- Location in Shire of Southern Grampians, Victoria
- 37°31′12″S 142°07′58″E
- Type: Homestead, associated built facilities and grounds
- Location: Cavendish, Victoria, Australia
- Nearest city: Ararat

History
- Built: ~1840s
- Built for: Thomas and Andrew Chirnside

Site notes
- Architectural style: Colonial

Victorian Heritage Register
- Official name: Mokanger Homestead
- Type: State heritage (built and natural)
- Reference no.: 23543

Mokanger (historically also rendered as Markangar or Markanger) is a historic pastoral property near Cavendish, Victoria, Australia. Established around 1839 during the early years of European settlement in the Western District, the station became one of several major pastoral runs associated with the Chirnside family and formed part of their extensive network of grazing properties known as the "Wannon runs". The property is also notable for its nineteenth-century homestead complex, with the original part of the homestead dating from the 1840s.

== History ==
The Mokanger run was first occupied by Edward Barnett between 1839 and 1841 as Portland Bay Run No. 69. Covering approximately 44,000 acres (18,000 ha), the run carried both sheep and cattle and was among the earliest pastoral establishments in the district. Barnett selected the site after exploring the Wannon River and surrounding wetlands.

In 1846, the property was acquired by brothers Thomas and Andrew Chirnside, two of the most prominent pastoralists in colonial Victoria. Mokanger joined nearby properties including Mount William and Mount William Plains to form the core of the Chirnside's western pastoral holdings, collectively known as the Wannon runs. Although the brothers later established their principal residences at Carranballac and subsequently at Werribee Park, Mokanger remained an important component of their pastoral operations and was generally supervised by resident managers.

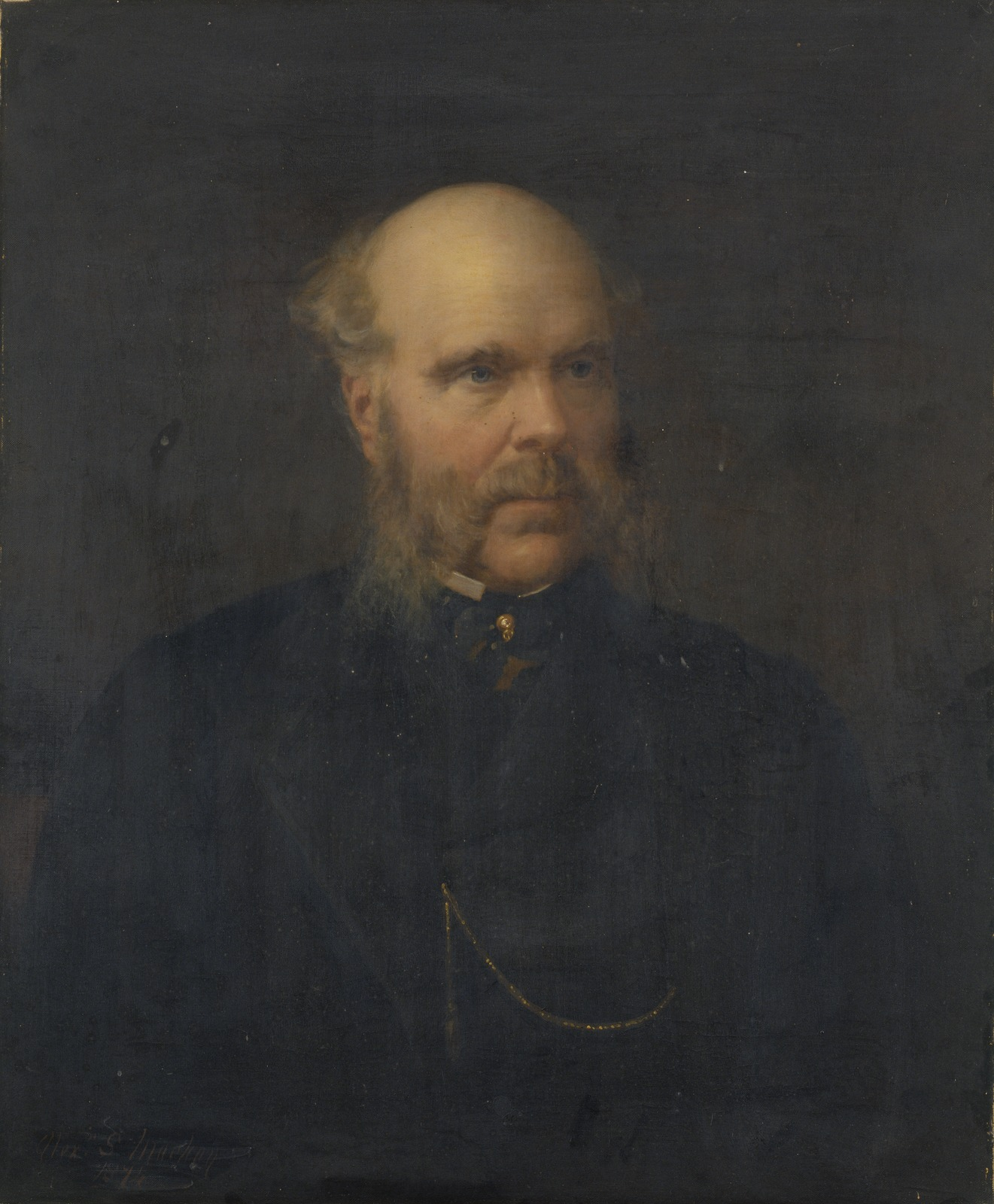
Thomas Chirnside

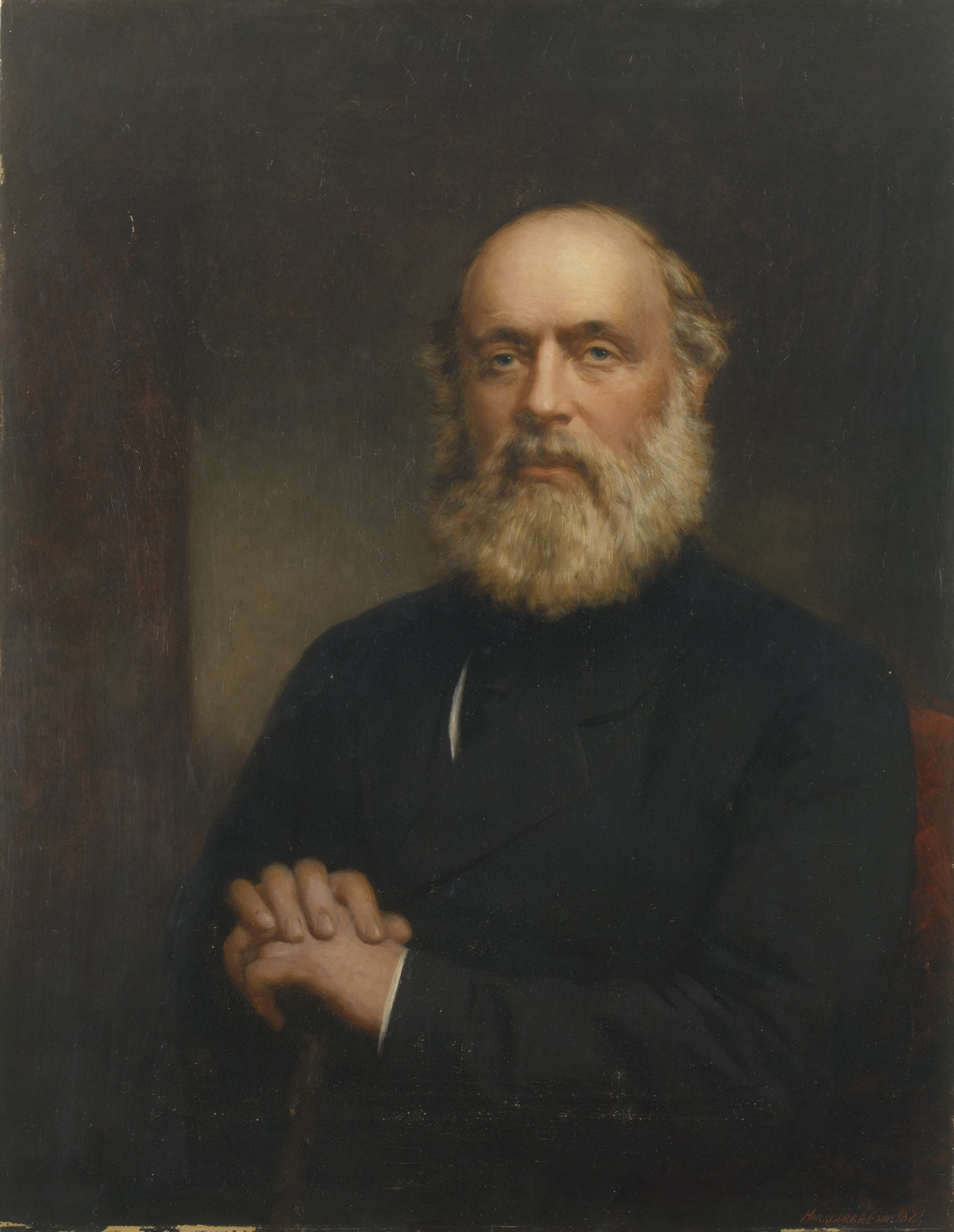
Andrew Chirnside

The Chirnsides expanded pastoral activities at Mokanger and introduced improvements to the station. They employed Aboriginal workers at the property, continuing practices already established on other Chirnside stations. Two Aboriginal men from Mount William reportedly acted as intermediaries with local communities, and before long a number of Aboriginal people were assisting with station work, including sheep washing.

During the 1840s and 1850s a homestead complex was established at Mokanger. Early buildings included a dwelling house, kitchen, men's quarters, stables and other service buildings constructed from locally quarried stone and handmade bricks, all erected by a team of stonemasons brought out from Scotland. The substantial bluestone stables, which survive today, are believed to date from this early phase of development. The Chirnsides also developed horse-breeding activities at the station, and their well-known stallion "Sir Peter" stood at stud at Mokanger during the late 1840s.

A larger homestead was subsequently developed as the station expanded, and additions were made after Andrew Chirnside returned from Scotland in the early 1850s with his wife and young family. By the mid-1850s, however, the family's primary focus had shifted to Carranballac, and Mokanger increasingly operated under resident management. The original woolshed was destroyed by fire in the early 1860s and was replaced in 1864 b a substantial new woolshed, which survives on the neighbouring South Mokanger property. During this period the Chirnside also secured freehold ownership of extensive areas surrounding Mokanger and nearby Kenilworth South, eventually controlling more than 31,000 acres (12,500 ha) in the district.

After nearly four decades of Chirnside ownership, Mokanger was sold in 1885 to Alexander McEdward, a South Australian pastoralist and investor. McEdward undertook further improvements to the homestead, but died in 1894. Ownership subsequently passed to his widow Alexandrina McEdward, who retained the property until her death in 1900. The estate then came under the control of the Australian Mercantile Land and Finance Company (AML&F), which gradually disposed of portions of the former station during the early twentieth century.

On 24th January 1906, a small grassfire broke out on the property. A rabbiter, who was near the outbreak, managed to keep the fire contained to an area of 150 acres, preventing further destruction to neighbouring properties.

In 1910, John William Gardner and his wife Alice purchased approximately 6,200 acres (2,500 ha) of the former Mokanger estate, including the homestead block. During their ownership, the homestead underwent further extensions and alterations, while the property continued to operate as a sheep and cattle enterprise. Following John Gardner's death in 1941, the property was managed by his sons Andrew, Hartley and Douglas Gardner. Part of the estate was later resumed under the Soldier Settlement Scheme, reducing its overall size.

In 1948, Douglas Gardner sold his interest in the property to his brothers. That same year Hartley Gardner established a separate holding south of Mokanger Road, lakter known as South Mokanger, which included the nineteenth-century Chirnside woolshed. Although ownership was divided, the properties continued to operate in close association for many years.

Andrew Gardner remained at Mokanger until his retirement in 1976, when the homestead property, then comprising approximately 2,400 acres (970 ha), was sold to Antony Baillieu. Baillieu expanded the holding through additional land purchases and leasing arrangements before selling the property in 1982 to Robert and Debbie Webb, and bought Mount Elephant. The Webbs constructed a modern woolshed and sheep-handling facilities before selling Mokanger in 1992, to Mark Rayner and his wife Carolyn. The property subsequently expanded through the acquisition of neighbouring land, including the former Soldier Settlement allotments at "Lewana".

As of 2020, the property had been bought by Chinese wool buyers Tianyu Wool, which, along with the purchase of Lewana, reputedly cost close to $14 million.

== See also ==
- Mount William Homestead
