= Point Cook Senior Secondary College =

Location
- Cnr Boardwalk Boulevard & Bergamot Drive, Point Cook VIC 3030; Point Cook, Victoria; Australia; 37.8876°S 144.7337°E

Information
- Type: State school
- Motto: Respect, Effort, Responsibility.
- Established: 2008
- Principal: Shaun Sleep
- Years offered: Senior School Years 10 to 12
- Gender: Co-Educational
- Enrollment: Approximately 799 (2026)
- International students: 16 (2026)
- Houses: Sabres (Blue), Demons (Yellow), Huey (Green), Dragons (Red)
- Colours: Navy and White
- Website: http://www.pointcooksenior.vic.edu.au/

Point Cook Senior Secondary College (PCSSC) is a state-run co-educational senior secondary school located in Point Cook, Victoria, Australia. The senior school has a three-year curriculum, composed of years ten to twelve.

Students who attend PCSSC generally come from feeder schools in the area such as Carranballac P-9 College, Saltwater P-9 College, Featherbrook P-9 College, and Point Cook P-9 College.

The college offers Victorian Certificate of Education (VCE), Vocational Education and Training (VET) and Victorian Certificate of Education Vocational Major (VCEVM). The school hosts many international students annually.

== History ==
The college was founded in 2008. Shaun Sleep became the principal in July 2024.

== Facilities ==
Located within the college is a Wellbeing Hub, where the offices of the school's wellbeing team are based. This is a safe space that students can visit throughout the school day. Point Cook Senior offers extensive careers counselling, with a whole team dedicated and based within the school's Year 12 building. In addition, there is a VET (Vocational Education and Training) building where each trade course is run for PCSSC students, and students from the Wyndham and Hobsons Bay councils. The school has a volleyball court, a rugby pitch, and a large oval with Australian Rules football. There is a breakfast club which is run on Monday, Wednesday and Friday.

== Uniform ==
Point Cook Senior Secondary College enforces a strict uniform policy aimed at safety and community identity. Key items include navy and maroon garments, featuring a jacket, zip top, puffer vest, and specific skirts or trousers. Uniforms are compulsory and are checked daily. Uniform detention is frequent for students who do not seek approval for uniform violations beforehand.

== SRC (Student Representative Council) ==
Students from all three year levels have the opportunity to participate in the school's SRC. Overseen by a teacher, they have a say in many aspects of the school, including events, the school's Instagram, promotions, diversity and lunch time clubs. Students on the SRC, and students from the electorate of Point Cook, have the opportunity to participate in the Point Cook Youth Advisory Council, run by Mathew Hilakari.

== See also ==
- List of schools in Victoria
- Victorian Certificate of Education
