= Carranballac Homestead =

Historic homestead in Victoria, Australia

Carranballac
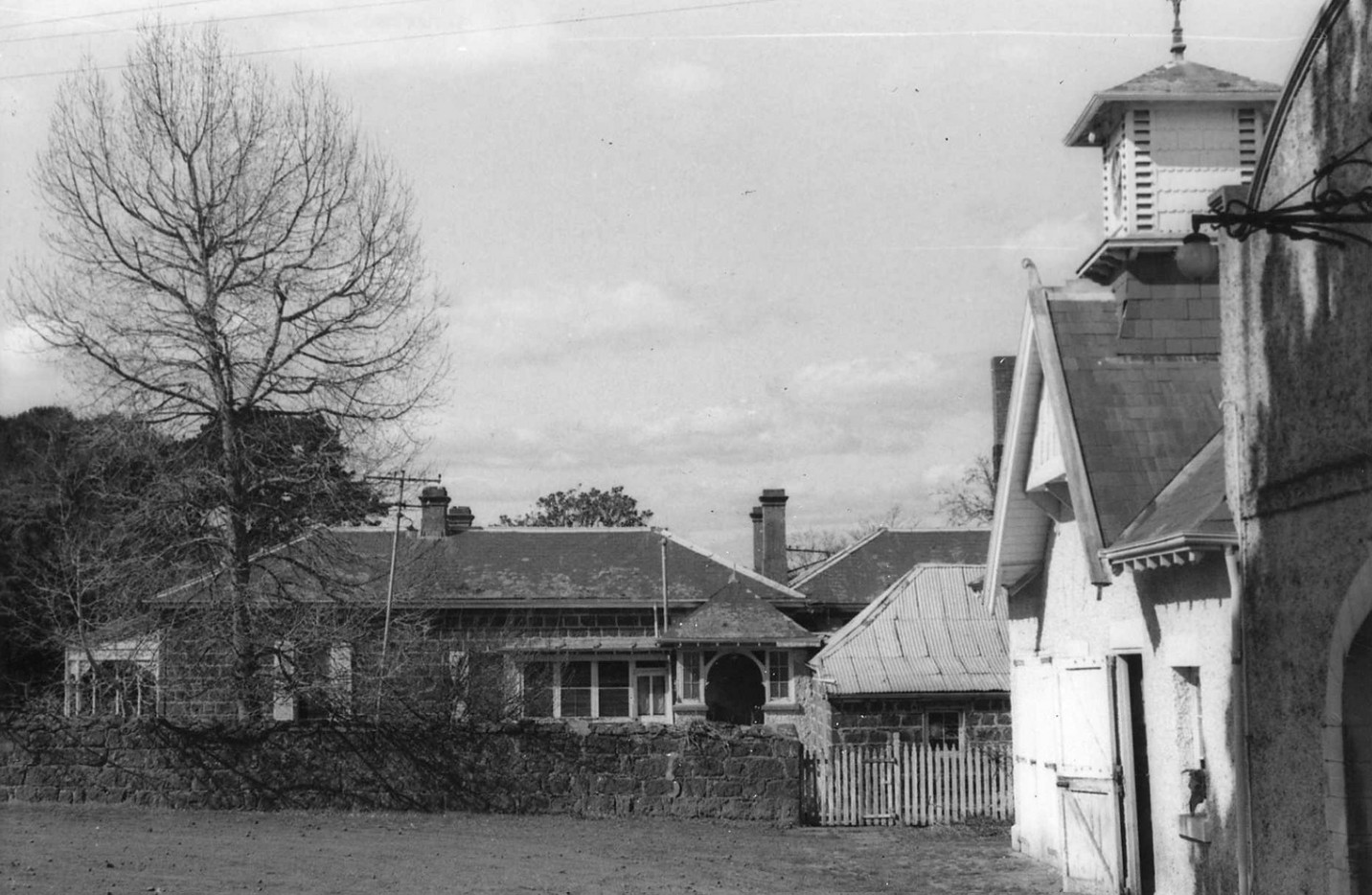
- Side view of Carranballac Homestead, 1967

- Location in Pyrenees Shire, Victoria
- 37°44′04″S 143°12′06″E
- Type: Homestead, associated built facilities and grounds
- Location: Carranballac, Victoria, Australia
- Nearest city: Ballarat

History
- Built: 1847 (later additions)
- Built for: Andrew Chirnside

Site notes
- Architect: Edward Prowse
- Architectural style: Classical

Carranballac is a historic pastoral property near Skipton in the Western District of Victoria, Australia. Established during the early years of European pastoral settlement in the 1840s, it became the principal Victorian station of the Chirnside family, one of the colony's most prominent pastoral dynasties. The estate was developed as a major sheep station and horse stud, remaining in Chirnside family ownership for five generations until 1987. The property is noted for its extensive nineteenth-century homestead complex, numerous surviving pastoral buildings, gardens associated with Baron von Mueller, and one of Victoria's earliest private hydro-electric schemes.

== History ==
The Carranballac run was established by Scottish pastoralists Andrew and Thomas Chirnside, who arrived in Australia in the early 1840s and became among the most successful pastoralists in colonial Victoria. After acquiring a chain of Western District runs, the brothers purchased the right to the 26,540-acre (10,741 ha) Carranballac run in 1854. Andrew and his wife Mary settled at Carranballac, while Thomas established himself at Werribee Park. By 1870 the Chirnside brothers owned approximately 250,000 acres of freehold land throughout Victoria, with Carranballac serving as their principal Western District station.

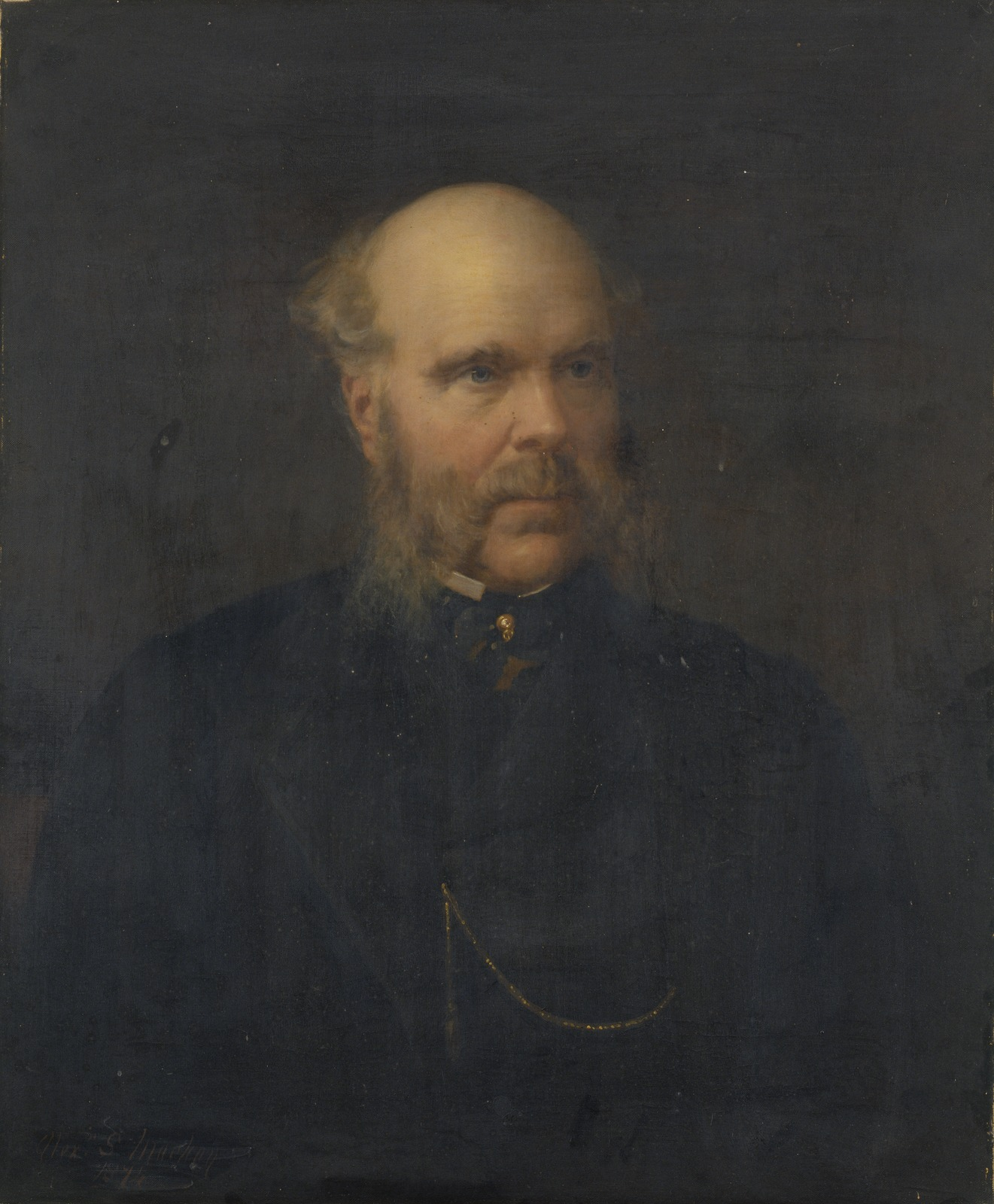
Thomas Chirnside

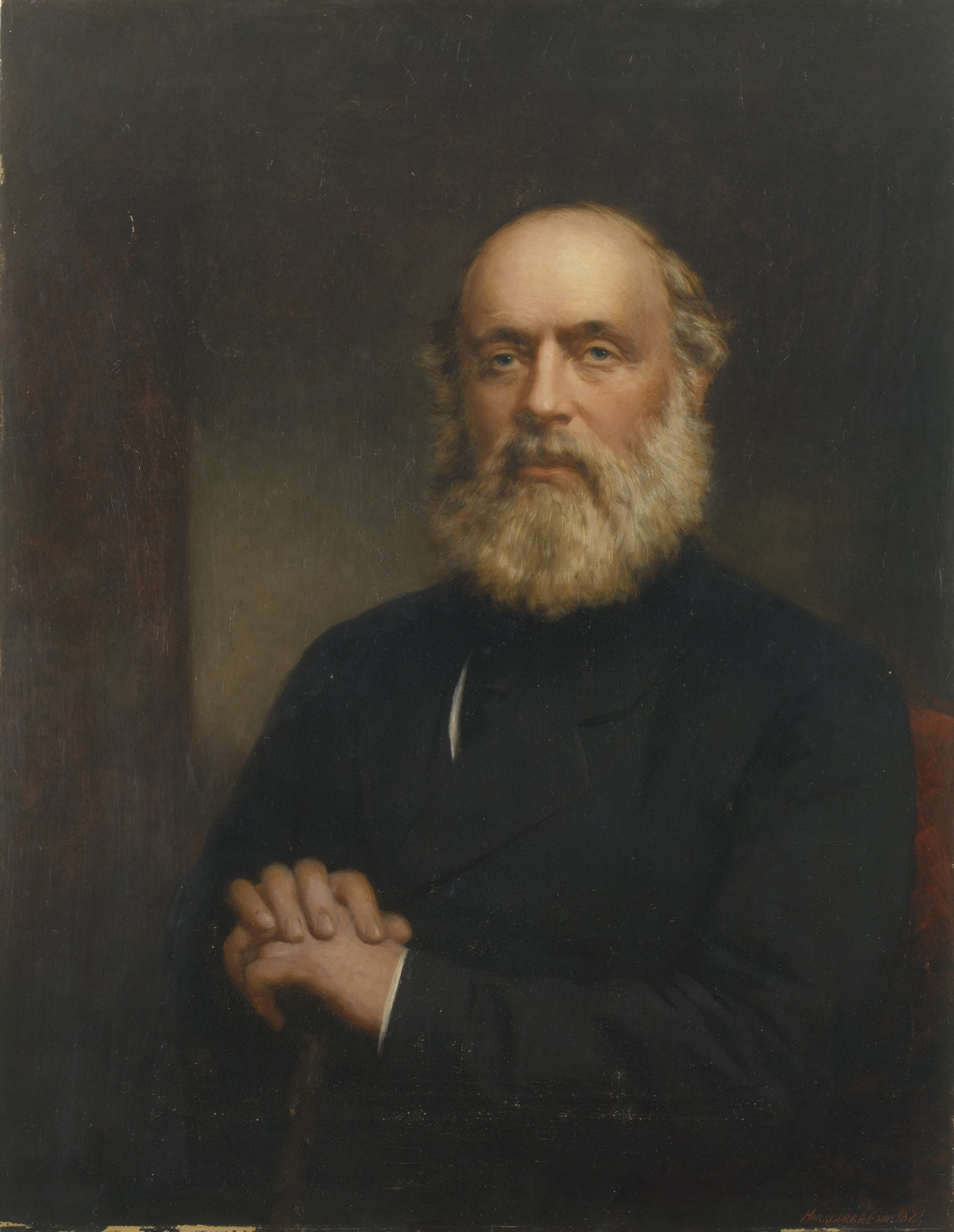
Andrew Chirnside

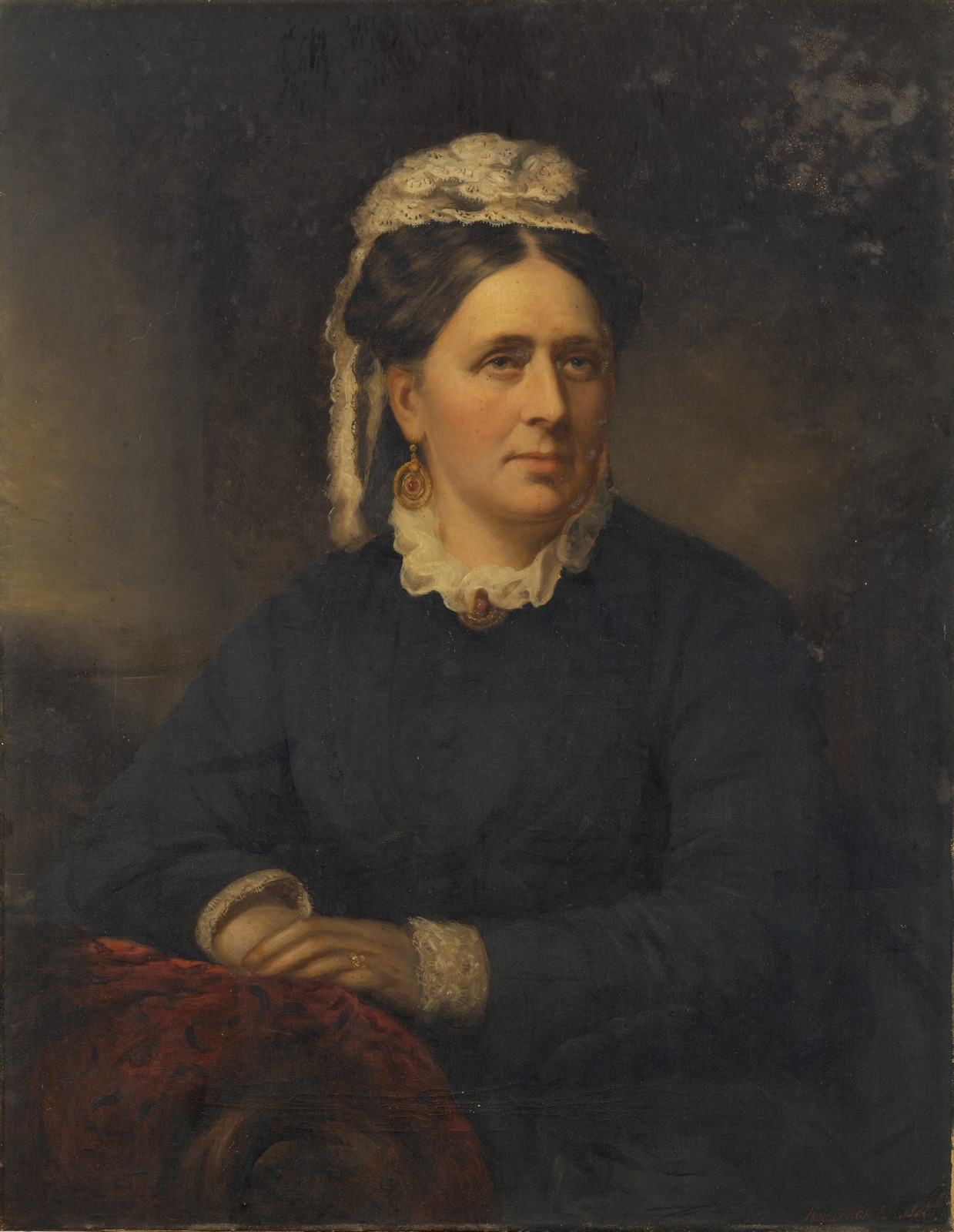
Mary Chirnside

The earliest buildings at Carranballac were erected during the 1840s and 1850s, comprising a timber dwelling and several stone cottages which initially provided accommodation for the station. These buildings were later retained as service facilities after construction of the present homestead. The principal bluestone residence was built in stages, with the earliest surviving sections possibly dating from 1847, a service wing completed in 1859, and major additions undertaken during the mid-1860s. The largely Classical homestead is a substantial L-shaped bluestone building roofed in slate and arranged around a rear courtyard. Later alterations included the addition of decorative cast-iron verandah work during the 1880s and Art Nouveau-inspired interior decoration, including an elaborate fireplace surround and timber detailing, in the early twentieth century. The homestead has been attributed to Geelong architect Edward Prowse.

Carranballac developed into one of the leading pastoral stations in Victoria's Western District. A horse stud had been established by 1865, while sheep breeding remained the property's principal enterprise. The surviving pastoral complex includes numerous bluestone outbuildings roofed in slate or corrugated iron over blackwood shingles, including an octagonal dairy, powder magazine, men's hut, stables, shearers' quarters and one of Victoria's earliest substantial woolshed. Constructed from around 1852 and subsequently enlarged, the 22-stand woolshed is believed to have been among the first in Victoria to install Wolseley mechanical shearing machines during the 1880s. The adjoining stables, probably dating from the late 1850s, were remodelled in 1910 with a large carriage house, garage, workshop and distinctive timber clock tower to accommodate the increasing use of motor vehicles. The homestead gardens were landscaped by Baron von Mueller, complementing the substantial pastoral buildings.

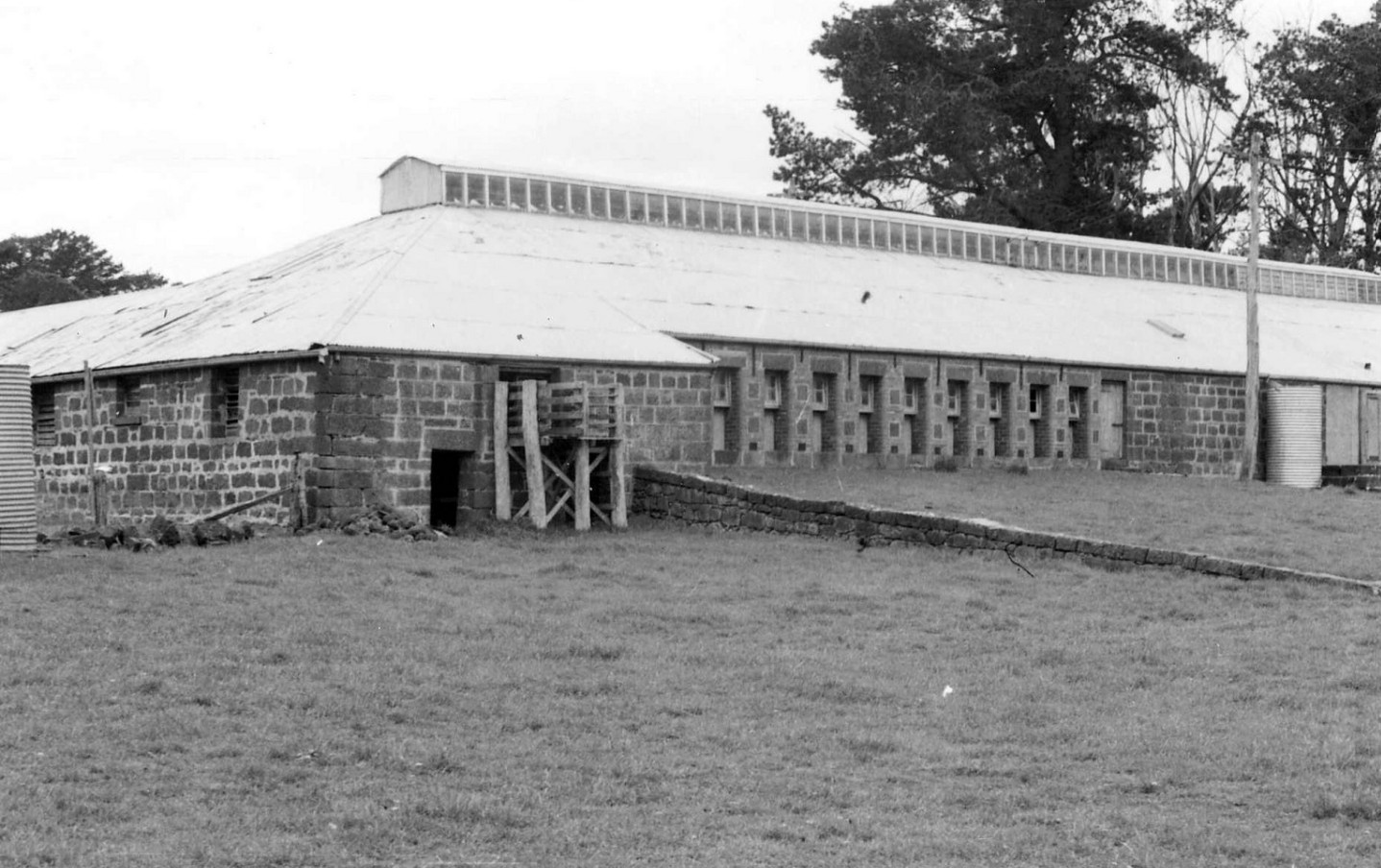
The woolshed

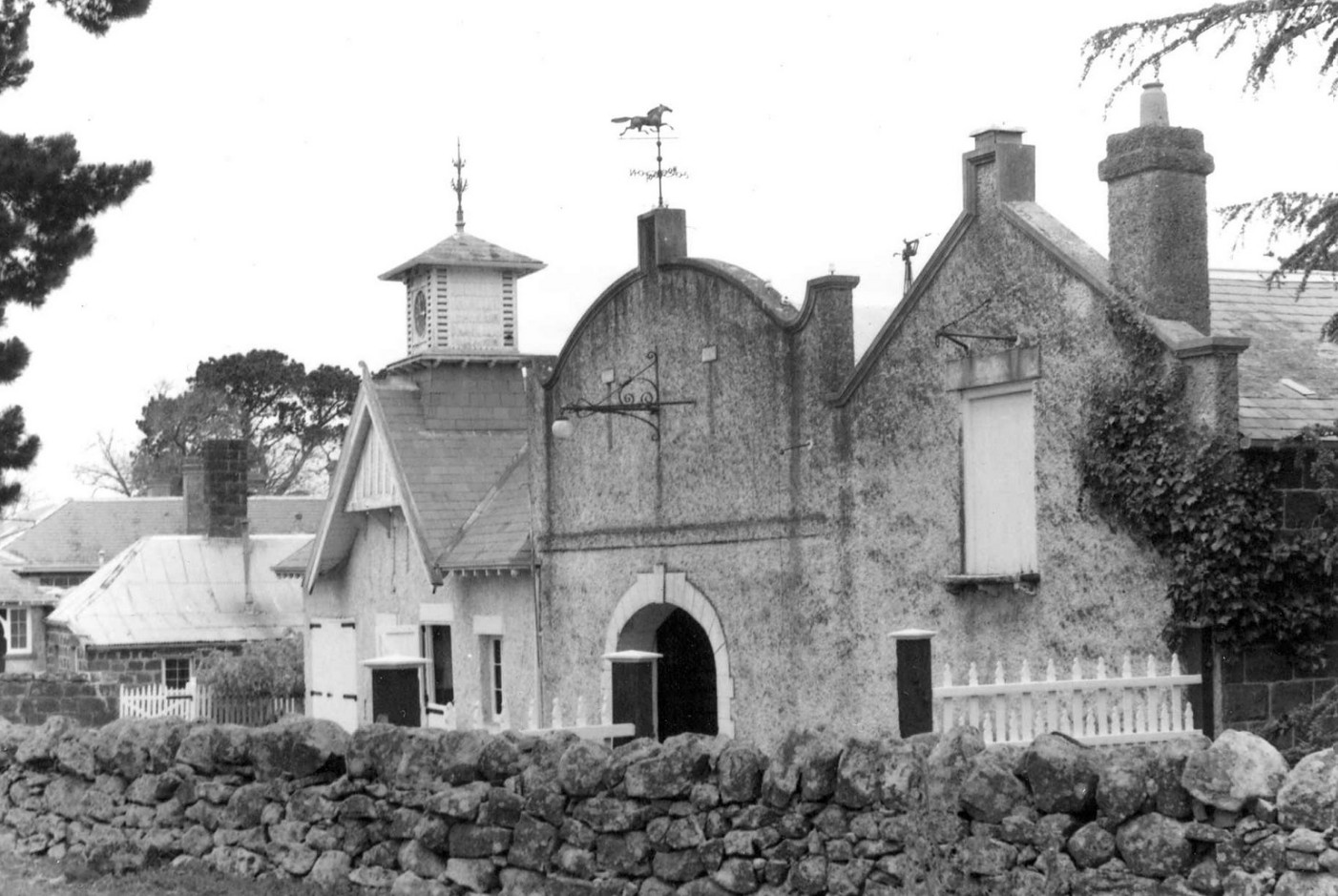
The stables

In 1882, approximately 50,000 acres of Carranballac were transferred to Andrew Chirnside's son Robert Chirnside, who, together with his wife, took up residence at the property in 1885. Following Robert's death in 1900, his son Gordon Chirnside assumed management of the estate from 1908. In 1909 he consolidated the homestead property by purchasing 15,448 acres, while selling other portions of the estate. During the same period, approximately 9,300 acres of Carranballac were purchased by a syndicate for subdivision into smaller farming properties. Gordon Chirnside remained at Carranballac until 1953, when he divided the property among his sons, with Robert receiving the homestead portion.

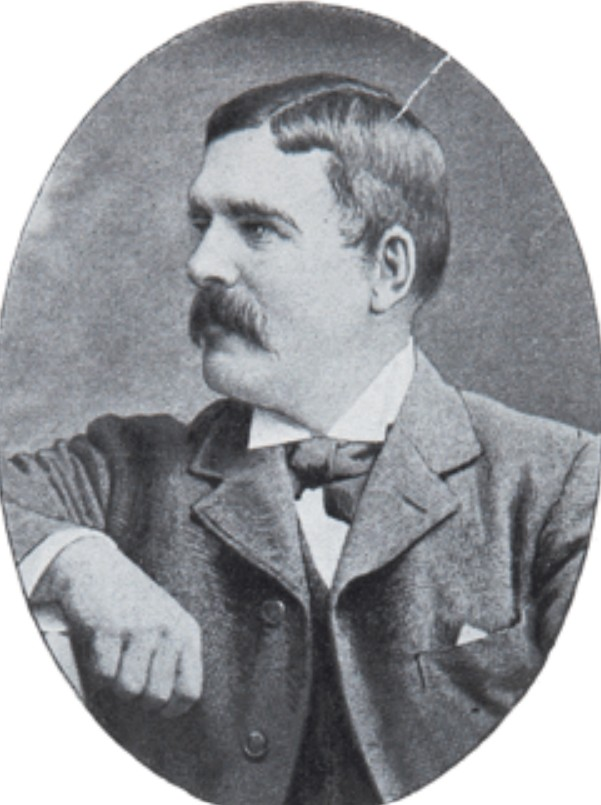
Robert Chirnside

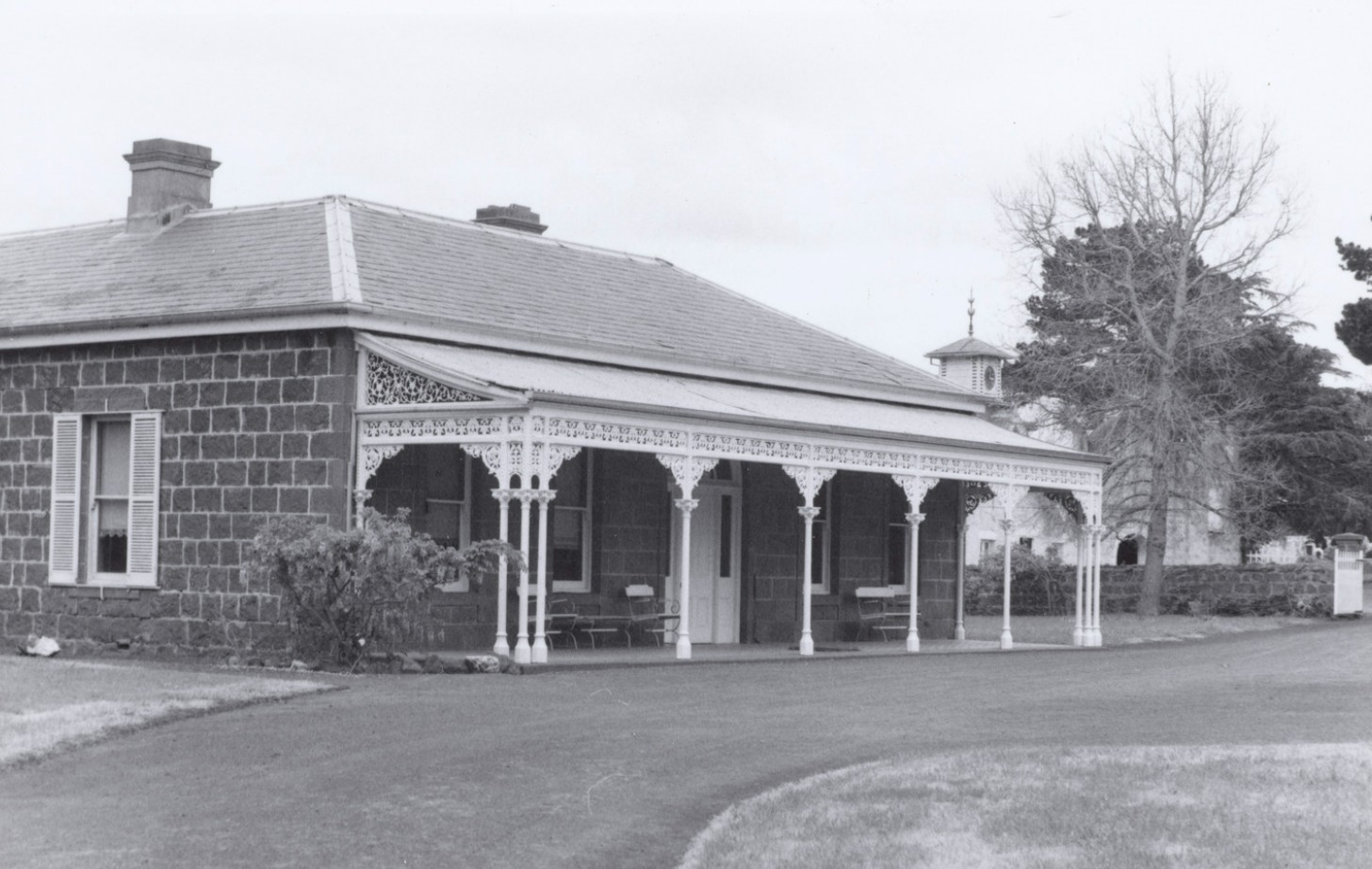
View of the homestead

Gordon Chirnside also undertook an ambitious programme of modernisation. In 1919, he commissioned the construction of a weir across Mount Emu Creek together with a powerhouse to generate hydro-electricity for the homestead and woolshed. Installed at considerable expense, the scheme enabled the rapid mechanisation of station operations and remains one of the earliest private hydro-electric installations associated with a Victorian pastoral property.

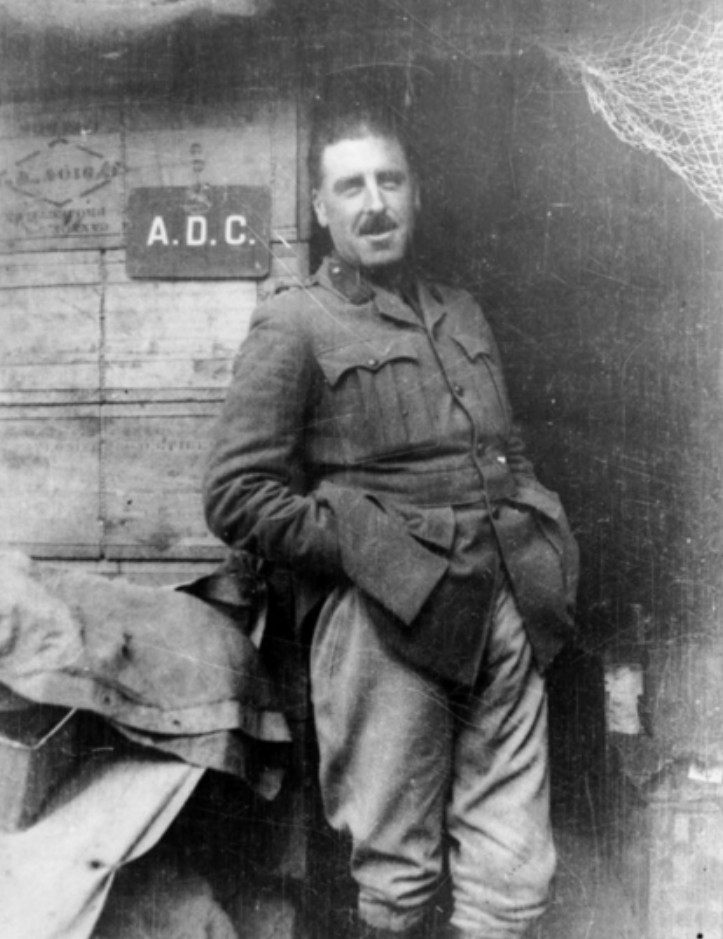
Captain Robert Gordon Chirnside, pictured at Gallipoli

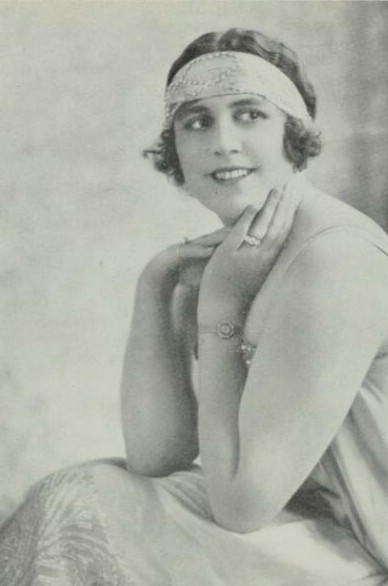
Gordon's wife, Mavis Ethel Chirnside (née Thiel)

Although reduced in size during the twentieth century, Carranballac continued to operate as a large grazing property. In 1933, a fire caused by sparks from a tractor burnt approximately 600 acres of stubble on the estate. More than 200 firefighters responded to the blaze, which reached sections of the Hamilton Highway before being brought under control. Damage was limited and largely covered by insurance.

Carranballac remained in the ownership of five generations of the Chirnside family until 1987.

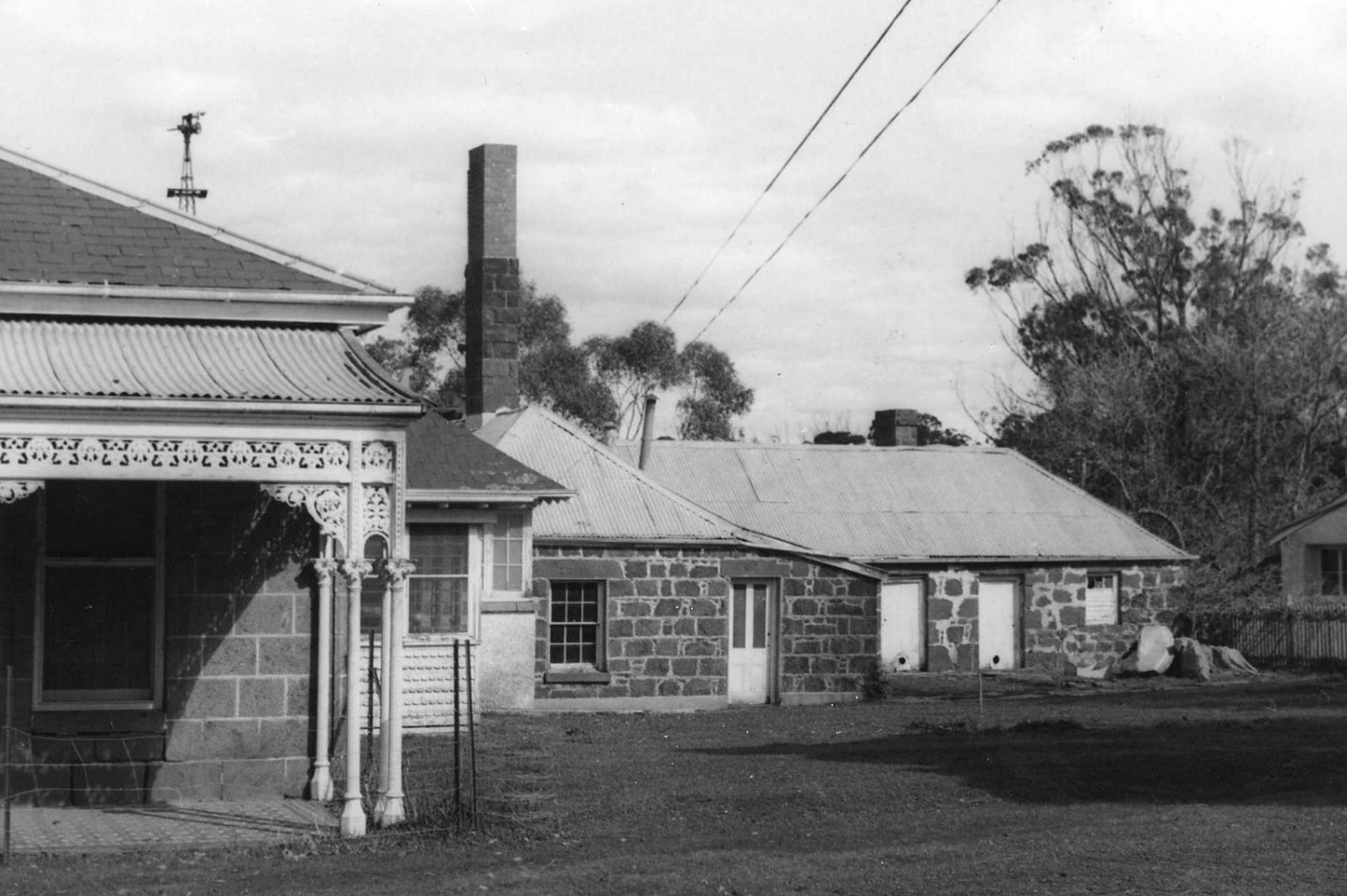
Another view of the homestead

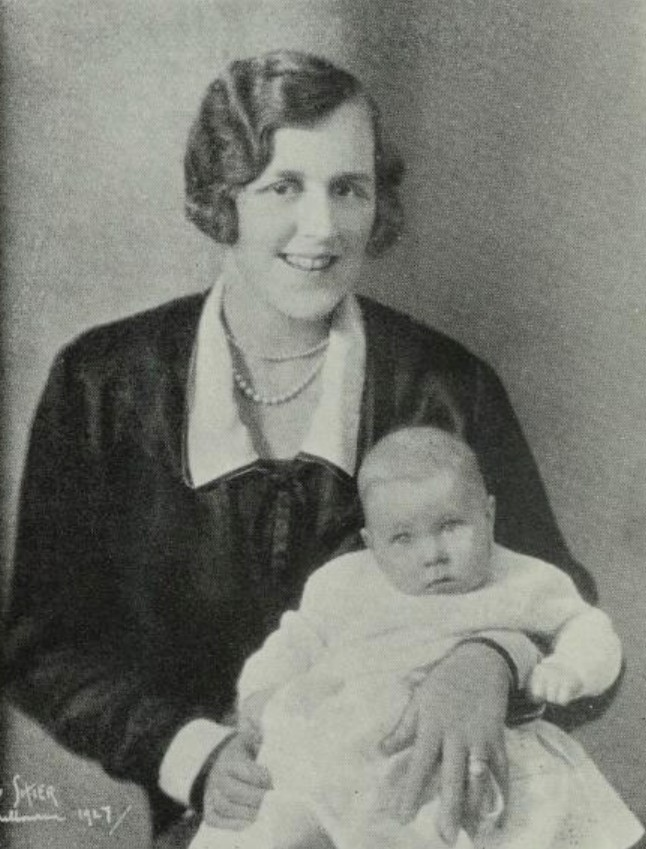
Mavis Chirnside, with Russell Chirnside

In January 2026, a large bushfire burnt through the locality of Carranballac, burning several houses and the nearby recreation reserve. The homestead and outbuildings were spared.

== See also ==
- Werribee Park
- Mount William Homestead
