= Mount William Homestead =

Historic homestead in Victoria, Australia

Mount William
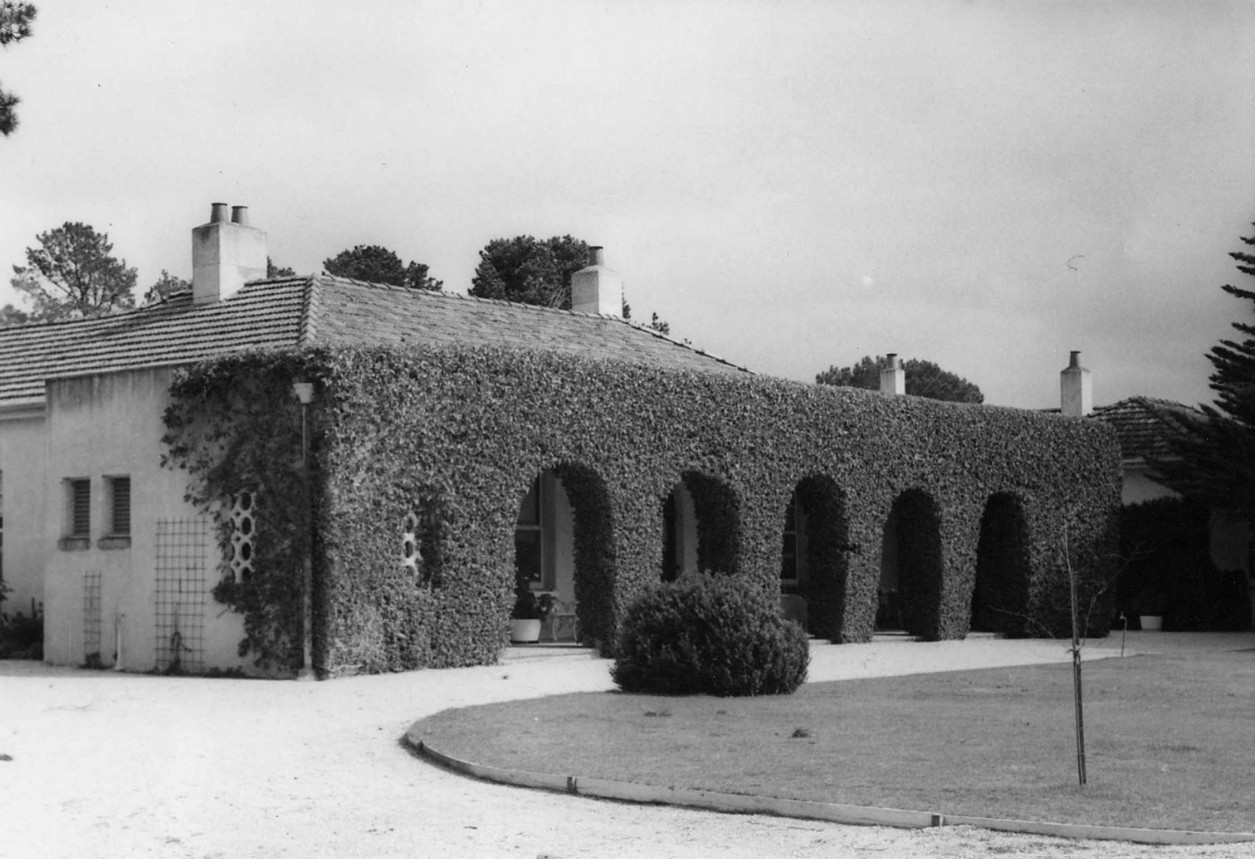
- Mount William Homestead, 1967

- Location in the Rural City of Ararat, Victoria
- 37°26′38″S 142°38′50″E
- Type: Homestead, associated built facilities and grounds
- Location: Willaura, Victoria, Australia
- Nearest city: Ararat

History
- Built: 1920 (present house)
- Built for: Thomas and Andrew Chirnside

Site notes
- Architectural style: Art deco

Victorian Heritage Register
- Official name: Mount William Homestead
- Type: State heritage (built and natural)
- Designated: 9 October 1974
- Reference no.: HO74

Mount William is a historic pastoral property located near Willaura in western Victoria, Australia, approximately 15 kilometres from the township. Established in 1842, it became one of the largest sheep and wool-growing stations in the Western District and has played an important role in the pastoral, agricultural and settlement history of the region. The property is particularly associated with the Chirnside family, among the most prominent pastoralists in colonial Victoria, and later with the Barr Smith family, who have owned the homestead block since 1919. Mount William is also noted for its historic woolshed and extensive homestead gardens.

== History ==
Mount William was first settled in 1842 by brothers Thomas and Andrew Chirnside, who recognised the pastoral potential of the country east of Mount William in the Grampians region. The Chirnsides initially established simple accommodation before constructing a more substantial six-bedroom bluestone homestead on what later became known as the Mount William Pre-emptive Right. The property formed part of the extensive pastoral empire developed by the family across western Victoria during the nineteenth century.

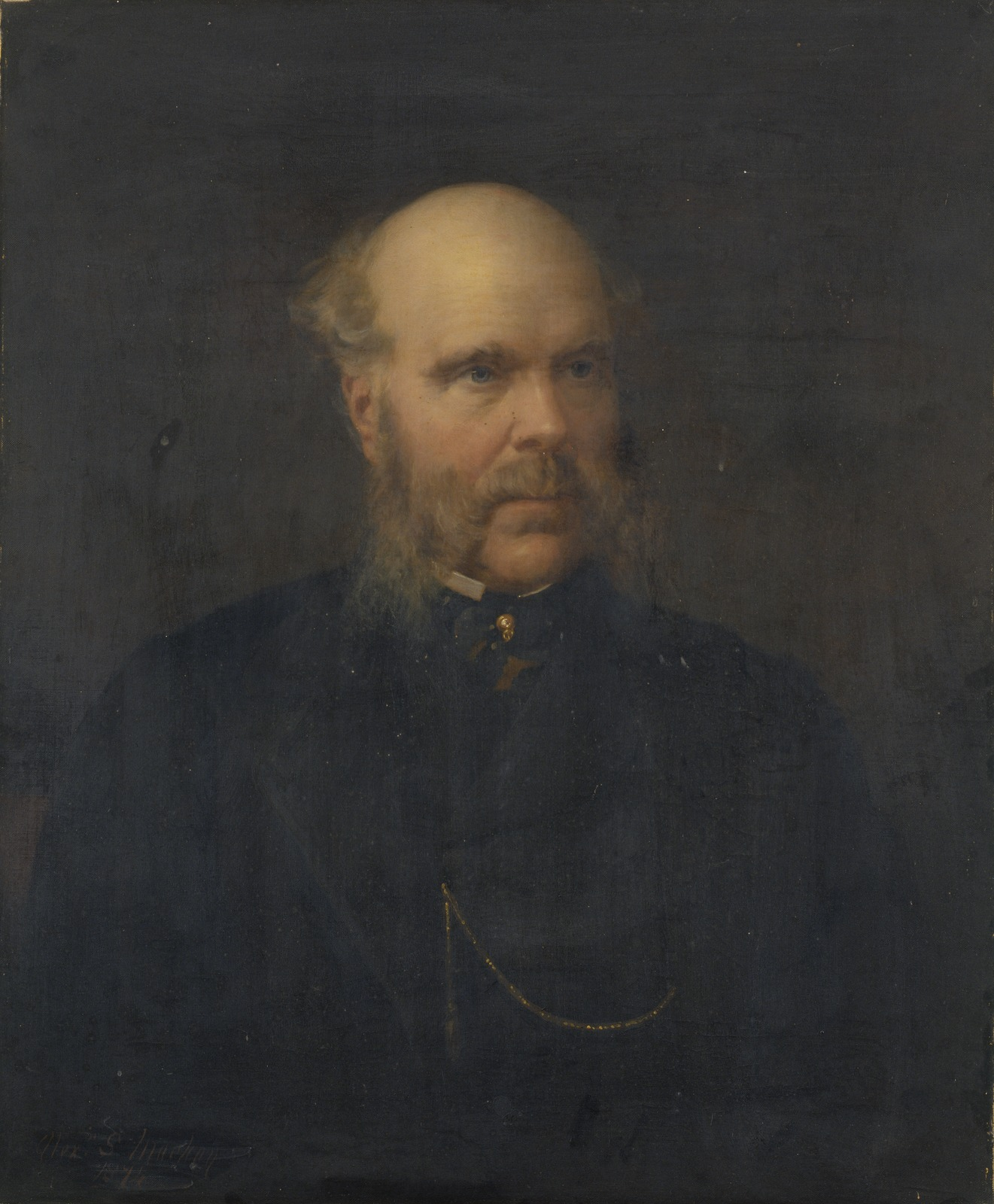
Thomas Chirnside

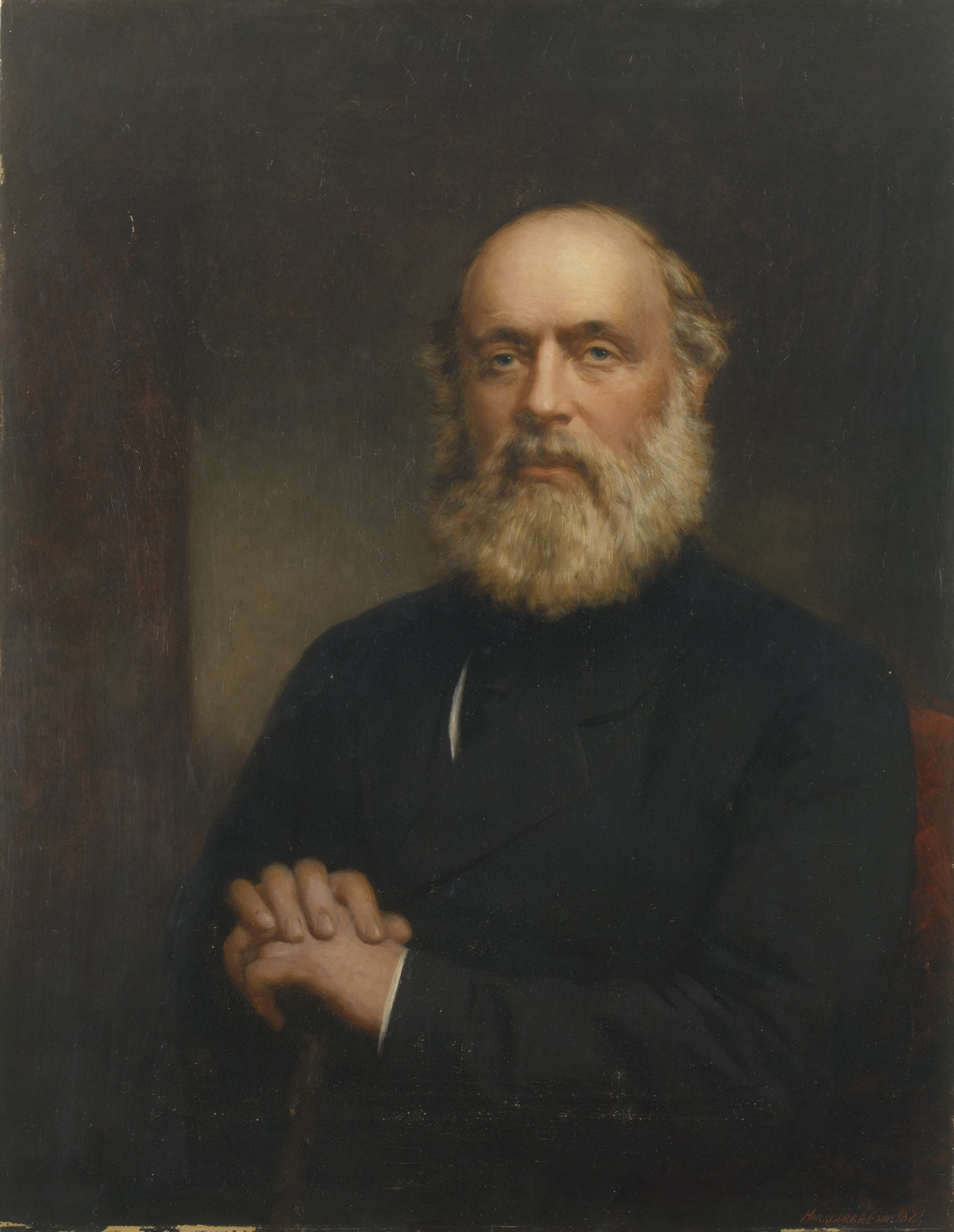
Andrew Chirnside

Initially held under pastoral lease, Mount William carried both fine-wool Merino sheep and cattle. Following the granting of freehold ownership by the colonial government in 1862, the Chirnside brothers invested heavily in permanent infrastructure, including the construction of a twenty-stand bluestone woolshed. The station expanded significantly during the second half of the nineteenth century and by 1880 the freehold estate covered almost 57,000 acres (23,000 ha), having grown from an original leasehold area of approximately 38,000 acres.

At its peak, Mount William was one of Victoria's most productive wool-growing properties. More than 100,000 Merino sheep were shorn annually, producing around 800 bales of wool each year. The estate formed part of an extensive network of Chirnside-owned stations that included Mokanger, Kenilworth South, Wardy Yallock, Curnong, Carranballac, Mount Elephant, Koort Koort-nong and Werribee Park. A comfortable homestead, church and numerous agricultural buildings were established to support the large workforce required to operate the station.

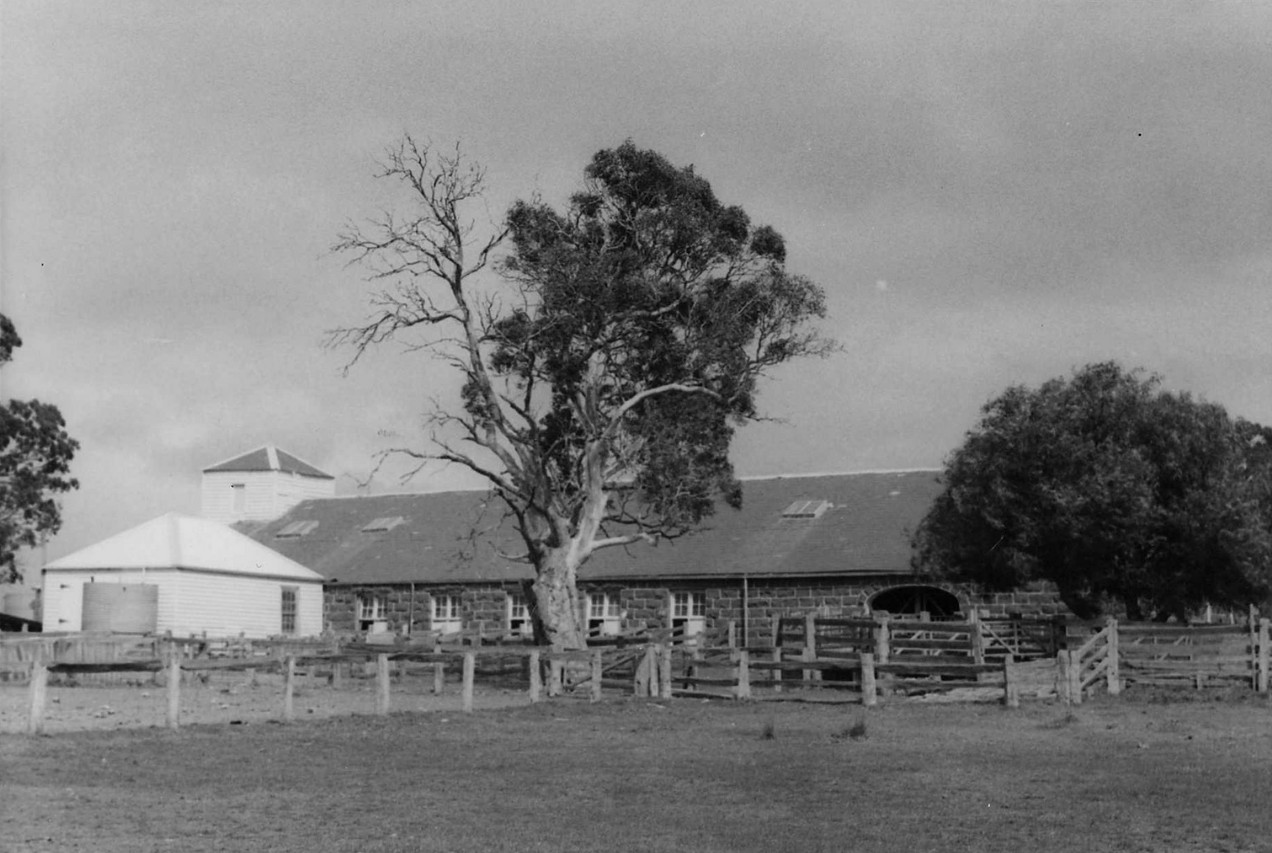
Mount William Homestead woolsheds

During the 1870s, the station was leased to Andrew Chirnside's sons, Andrew and Robert Chirnside, continuing the family's involvement in the property. However, Mount William also became notable for pioneering a different approach to land use. It was among the first large pastoral estates in western Victoria to make substantial areas available to tenant farmers and share-farmers.

In 1897, trustees of the young Andrew Chirnside's estate instructed station manager George Hesketh to arrange farming leases on portions of Mount William. Blocks ranging from 100 to 300 acres (40–120 ha) were made available, and demand proved exceptionally strong. Within a short period approximately 10,000 acres (4,050 ha) had been taken up, with teams of horses ploughing land that had previously been devoted exclusively to grazing. Wheat cultivation became firmly established in the district as a result.

By the early twentieth century, more than sixty tenant farmers were leasing land at Mount William. Many sought permanent ownership, and growing political pressure emerged across Victoria for the subdivision of large pastoral estates. In response, the trustees of the Chirnside estate offered Mount William for sale in 1906. The property comprised approximately 56,985 acres, with around half already occupied by tenant farmers. Although there was strong lobbying for government acquisition and subdivision, the trustees successfully retained ownership through a reserved bidding arrangement. Subsequently, however, approximately 37,000 acres were sold to a Hamilton syndicate, which subdivided the land into farms and sold them to settlers.

Around 20,000 acres, including the homestead and woolshed, were retained for Russell Chirnside, who had expressed an interest in wool growing and sheep brereding. Although he spent some time at Mount William, he ultimately chose to settle at Carranballac, and the remaining estate was eventually sold to Hamilton pastoralist William Philp.

In 1919, shortly after returning from service on the Western Front with the 1st Regiment of Life Guards, Robert Barr Smith of Adelaide purchased Mount William from William Philp. The acquisition marked the beginning of a family association that continues into the present day. Soon after the purchase, disaster struck when the original homestead was destroyed by fire. Robert Barr Smith's wife, Eda Barr Smith (née Seeck), who had been born in Riga, Latvia (then part of the Russian Empire), oversaw the construction of a new Spanish-influenced homestead with a terracotta-tiled roof and established extensive gardens around it.

The gardens developed under Eda Barr Smith became one of the defining features of Mount William. Over time, they expanded into one of the largest homestead gardens in Victoria, requiring several full-time gardeners to maintain flower beds, orchards and kitchen gardens. The surviving landscape reflects both nineteenth-century and twentieth-century design influences and has been compared to compartmentalised English garden traditions seen at Sissinghurst and Hidcote.

During the 1920s, further agricultural development occurred as more than 2,000 acres (810 ha) were cultivated. Following Robert and Eda Barr Smith's retirement to Delamere on the Mornington Peninsula, the property passed to their son Robert Mitchell Barr Smith and his wife Elizabeth.

A notable development occurred during the 1960s when Robert Mitchell Barr Smith became interested in Charolais cattle after observing their success in arid regions during a visit to Mexico. In 1969 he was among the first Australian breeders to important Charolais semen, using it to improve existing Friesian, Shorthorn and Angus cattle. Within a decade Mount William had established one of Australia's leading Charolais studs.

One of the best-known employees associated with Mount William was Italian migrant Sergie Tognon, who arrived in Australia as a teenager and worked on the property for 47 years. Originally employed as a gardener, he maintained extensive grounds before later share-farming parts of the estate. His contribution is commemorated by a plaque in the homestead's rose garden.

In 1985, Robert Mitchell Barr Smith divided the remaining 15,000 acres (6,075 ha) among his four daughters. One of them, Anne Abbott (née Barr Smith), retained the homestead property and continued the family's involvement in sheep and cattle breeding. By the early twenty-first century, management had largely passed to the next generation of the family.

In February 2006, the Mount Lubra bushfire swept through the district and burned approximately 80% of Mount William. The fire destroyed 56–58 kilometres of fencing, killed around 200 sheep, and destroyed significant quantities of hay. Despite the scale of the disaster, the historic homestead and bluestone woolshed survived without major damage.

== See also ==
- Mokanger
- Carranballac Homestead
- Werribee Park
- Yarram Park
