= Thomas Chirnside =

Australian pastoralist (1815–1887)

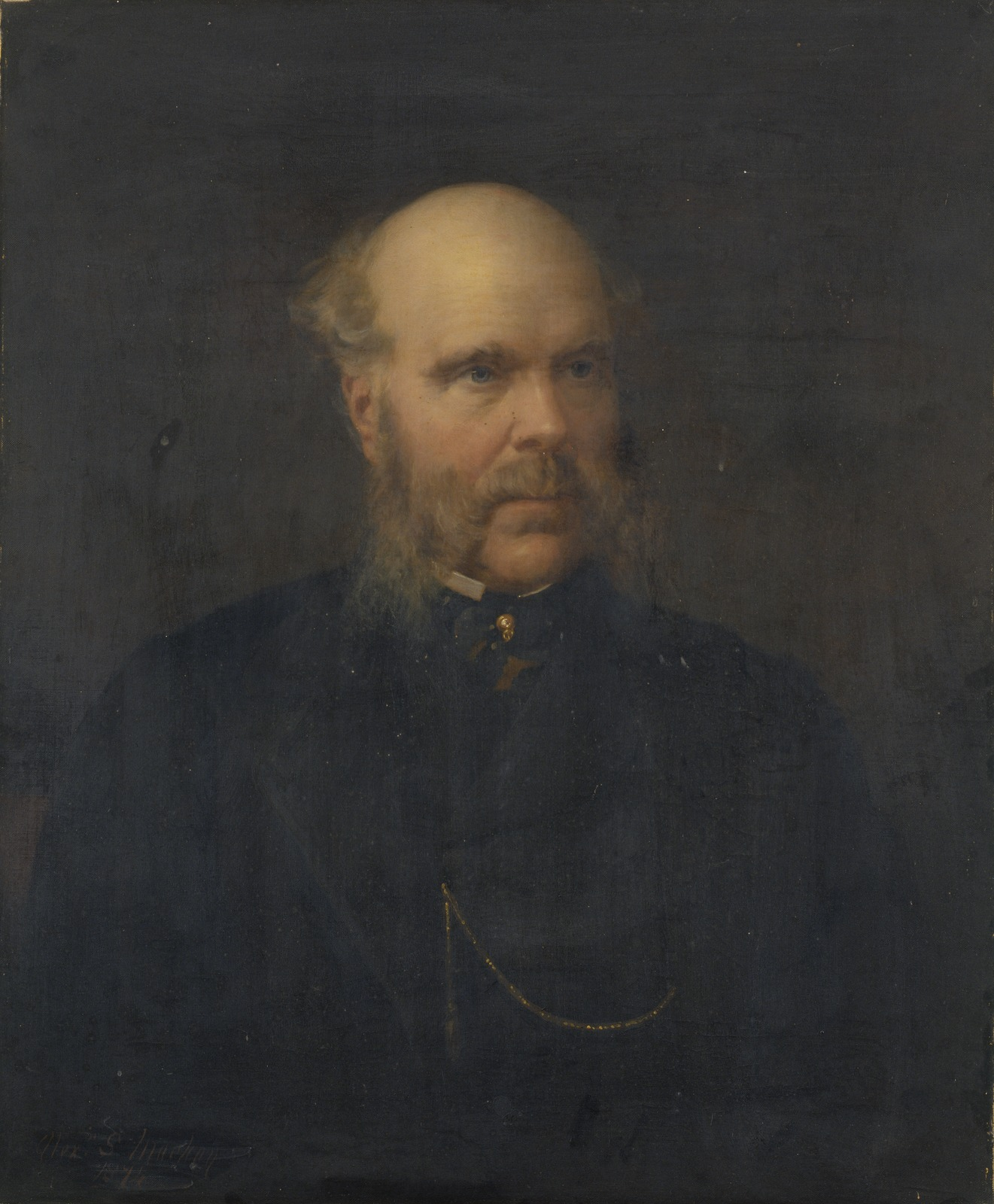
Thomas Chirnside

Thomas Chirnside (1815–1887) was a Scottish-born pastoralist, sportsman, and philanthropist who became one of the early European settlers in Victoria, Australia. Alongside his brother Andrew, he established a vast network of pastoral stations across the Western District and built a grand bluestone mansion on an 80,000-acre estate in Werribee. Renowned for breeding livestock, importing thoroughbred horses, and supporting local church and educational institutions, Chirnside suffered from severe illness and depression in his later years, ultimately taking his own life in 1887.

== Background ==
In 1815, Thomas Chirnside was born to Robert and Mary (née Fairs) Chirnside in the Scottish village of Cockburnspath. In the 1820s and the 1830s, thousands of Scots were spurred on by poverty and famine to try and make a living in colonial Australia. Scottish squatters and rural workers started farms. In January 1839, Thomas Chirnside arrived in Adelaide with a Bible from his mother and several hundred pounds from his father. Thomas had told his parents that he would only return home if he became a rich and respected man, before boarding the Bardaster in Liverpool.

Thomas was raising sheep on the Murrumbidgee by April, but drought forced him to abandon his flock. He joined his itinerant brother, Andrew, in Melbourne, and the two set about finding a good place to settle.

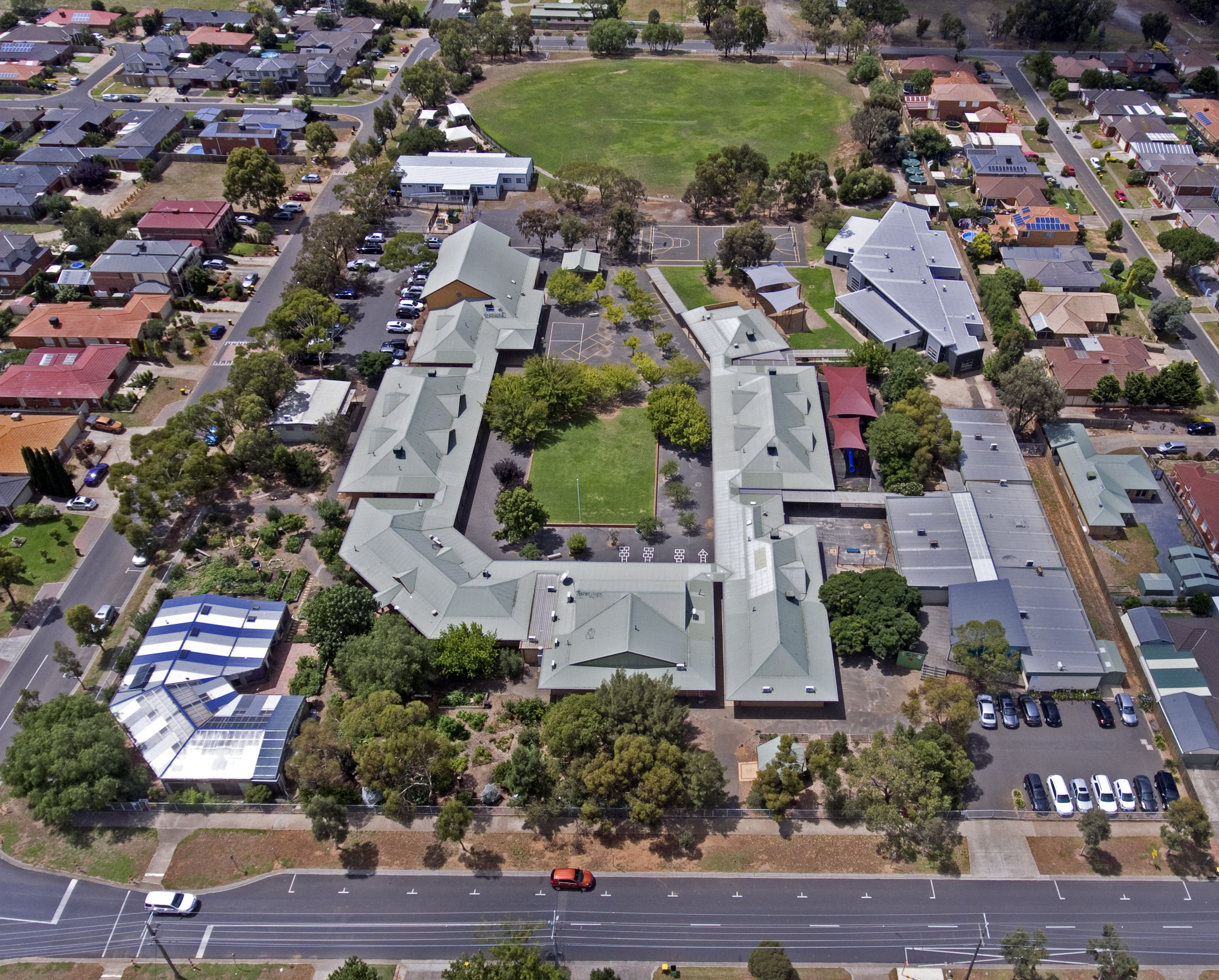
An aerial view of the Thomas Chirnside School in Werribee, 2018

In April 1842, the brothers established a station in the Grampians, and that same year Thomas acquired a station on the Wannon River, where he was one of the first to employ Aboriginal people. In the mid-1840s the brothers acquired a series of properties in the Western District of Victoria, including Mokanger, Carranballac and Mount William.

The elder Chirnside settled in Werribee, Victoria, just before the gold rushes, eventually buying 32,000 hectares (80,000 acres). He built a substantial bluestone house surrounded by a ha ha wall, and later, in the 1870s, the sandstone Italianate Werribee Park Mansion.

On 2 September 1853, he purchased, through a government grant, Section 14, in the Parish of Cut Paw Paw, County of Bourke. The allotment was 36 hectares (89 acres), which is now the Melbourne suburb of Kingsville.

From 1857 to 1859, Thomas Chirnside was a member of the Philosophical Institute of Victoria, and of the Royal Society of Victoria from 1860 to 1866. He was a strict Sabbatarian, allowing no work on his properties on Sundays. He donated four thousand square metres (one acre) and £100 for the first Presbyterian Church in Werribee and, in February 1884, he laid the foundation stone of the second one. He and his brother, Andrew Spencer Chirnside, gave £1,000 to Ormond College at the University of Melbourne. Thomas and his brother, Andrew Spencer Chirnside, bought Skibo Castle, located to the west of Dornoch in Sutherland, Scotland, and the surrounding 20,000 acres for £125,000 in 1868 and lived there until they sold it in 1871 for £130,000.

In 1887, suffering from depression, Thomas Chirnside committed suicide with a shotgun in the garden of the Werribee Park Mansion. Andrew Spencer Chirnside inherited the property, but died three years later.

A primary school in Werribee was named in Thomas's honour.
