= Werribee Park =

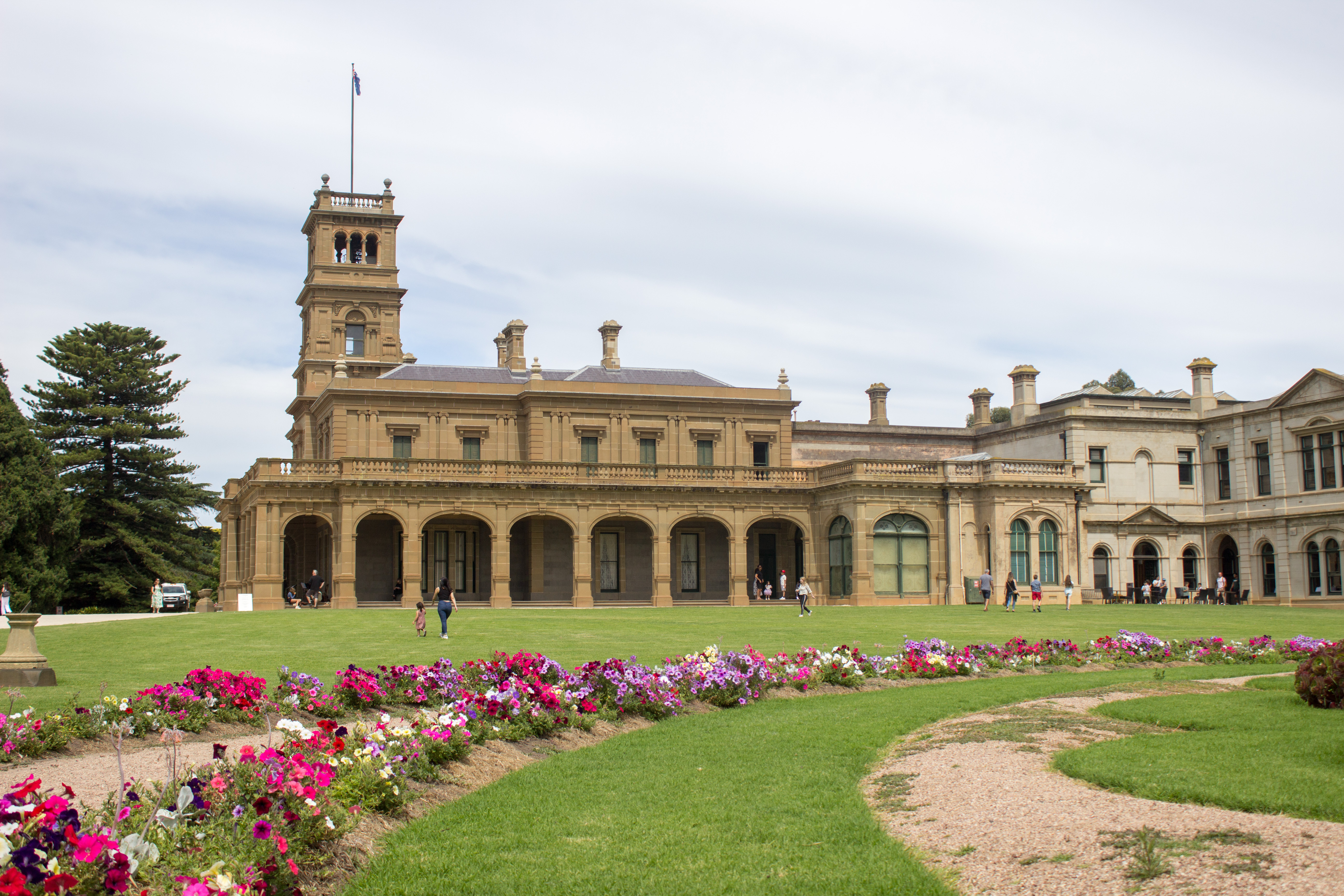
- Werribee Park mansion

- Location in greater Melbourne
- 37°55′52″S 144°40′12″E
- Type: Mansion, associated built facilities and grounds
- Location: Werribee, Victoria, Australia

History
- Built: 1874–1877
- Built for: Thomas Chirnside and family

Site notes
- Architectural style: Italianate
- Governing body: Parks Victoria
- Owner: Victoria State Government

Victorian Heritage Register
- Official name: Werribee Park
- Type: State heritage (built and natural)
- Designated: 1 April 1987
- Reference no.: 1207

Werribee Park is the estate of a historical building in Werribee, Victoria, Australia.

It includes Werribee Park Mansion, the Victoria State Rose Garden, formal gardens, the Werribee Park National Equestrian Centre, the Werribee Open Range Zoo, a contemporary sculpture walk and a natural riverine which is being grown with the plants of the Kurung Jang Balluk clan who lived on Werribee River. There is also the Mansion Hotel and Conference Centre. The Park was purchased by the Victoria State Government in 1973. It was opened as a tourist attraction in 1977. It is run by Parks Victoria. The mansion and associated built facilities and grounds were listed on the Victorian Heritage Register on 1 April 1987.

== Mansion ==
Werribee Park Mansion was built between 1874 and 1877 in the Italianate-style by the pioneering pastoralists Thomas Chirnside (1815-1887) and his brother Andrew Chirnside (1818-1890), from Scotland, founders of the "Chirnside Pastoral Empire". Its residential and working buildings supported a large farm workforce. The rooms open to the public include the billiard room, the main bedrooms, the reception rooms and part of the kitchen.

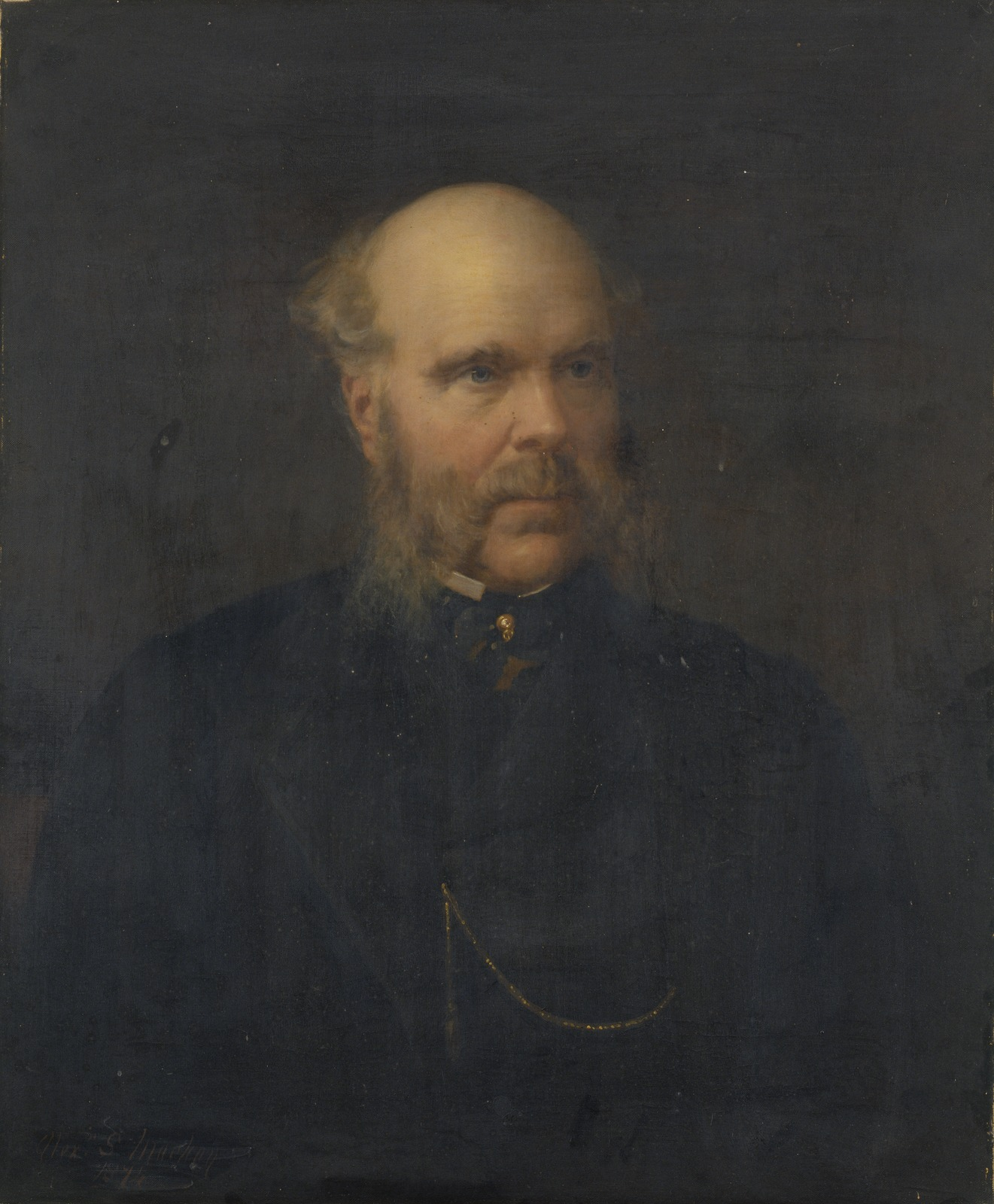
Thomas Chirnside

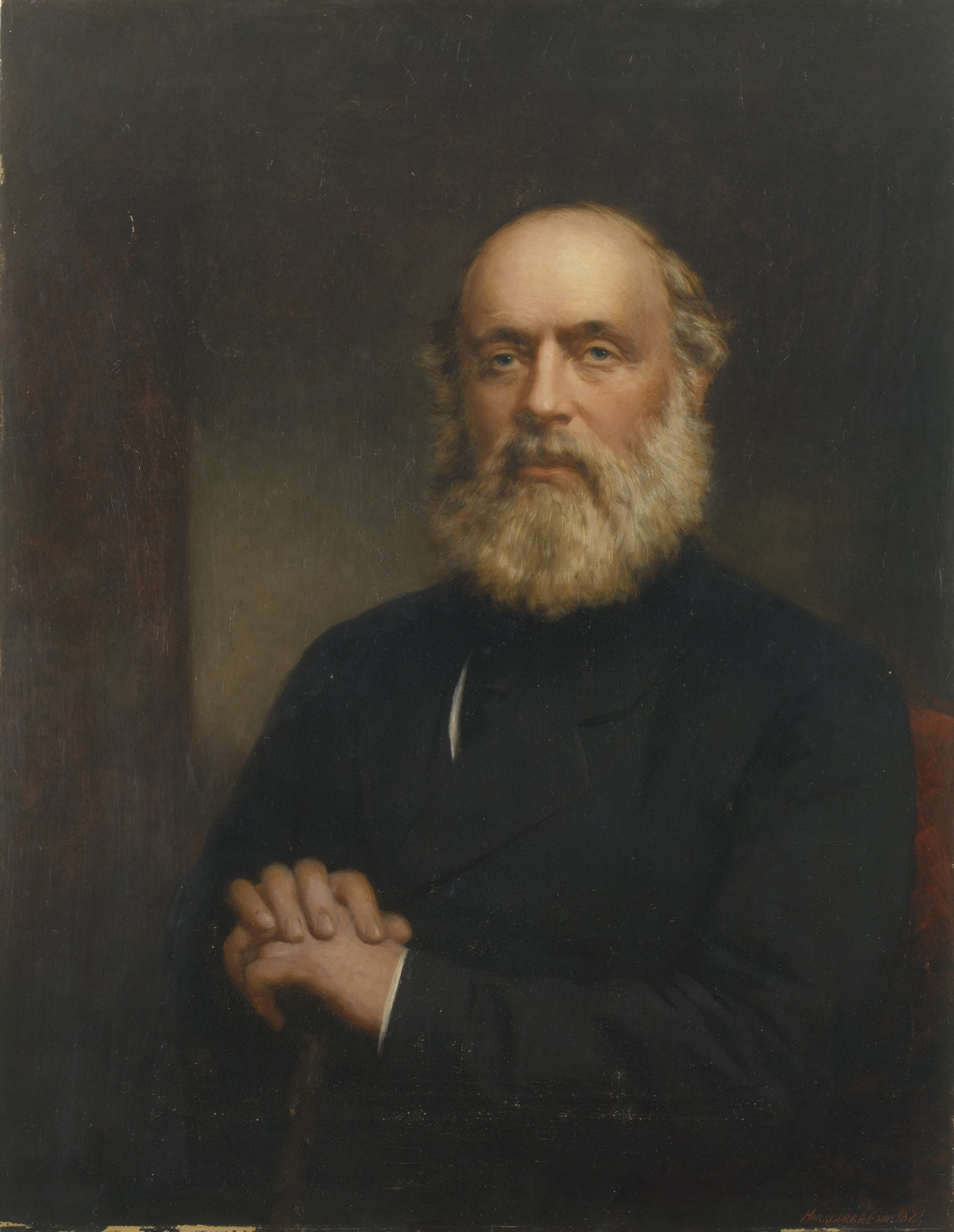
Andrew Chirnside

A local newspaper, "The Bacchus Marsh Express" of Saturday 14 October 1876 on page 2 stated that "here we may say that the contractor for the building — Mr. P. Colquhoun — has been the chief designer, assisted by Mr. Fox, architect, and by the Messrs. Chirnside themselves." P. Colquhoun was Parlane Colquhoun (1823-1877) and Mr Fox was James Henry Fox (1827-1900).

"The Bacchus Marsh Express" of Saturday 7 July 1877 on page 3 stated that "Mr. Huckson .... has had a good deal of the management of Mr. Chirnside's new house". Mr. Huckson was Robert Huckson (1824-1902) who was resident nearby in Wyndham at the time and who had constructed the walls and freestone ornamentation of the Treasury Building at Spring Street, Melbourne about 1860.

The Melbourne newspaper "The Age" of Saturday 15 Dec 1877 on page 5 stated "There is on exhibition, in the window of Mr. W. R; Stevens, 78 Swanston-street, a picture, which is indicative of the immense fortunes made by some of those who have been lucky or clever enough to aggregate large treats of land in this colony. It is a representation of a mansion erected by Messrs. T. and A. Chirnside on their estate at Werribee Park, which appears to be one of the finest buildings of the kind in Victoria. The building was commenced between three and four years ago, and was designed by Mr. James H. Fox, architect, of this city, who has also had the superintendence of the works. The structure is of brick, with solid Barrabool-hill freestone facings, and its cost has been about £60,000. The design is of the modern classic style, and reflects great credit on the architect, whose name is well known in connection with several other large houses, notably that of the late Mr. John Moffatt, at Chatsworth House, in the Western district."

After his death in November, 1877, the contracting equipment of Parlane Colquhoun was advertised for sale at Werribee Park in "The Age" of Tuesday 25 June 1878 on page 4.

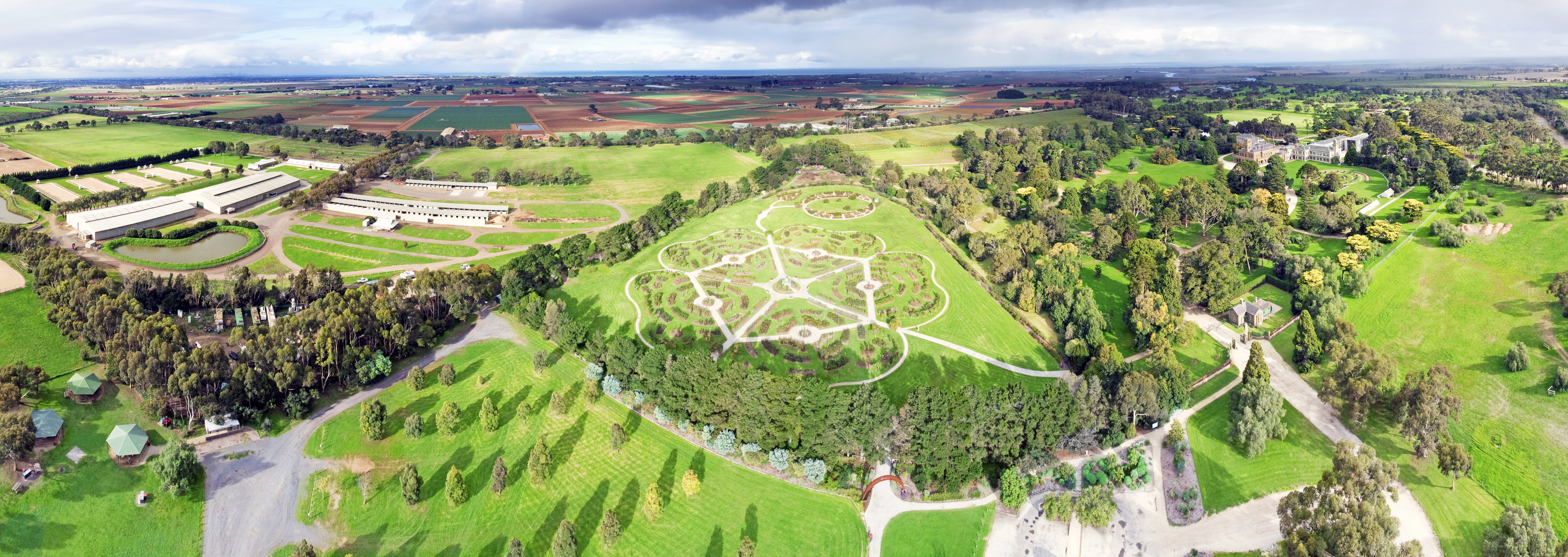
Aerial Panorama of Werribee Park and its surrounds

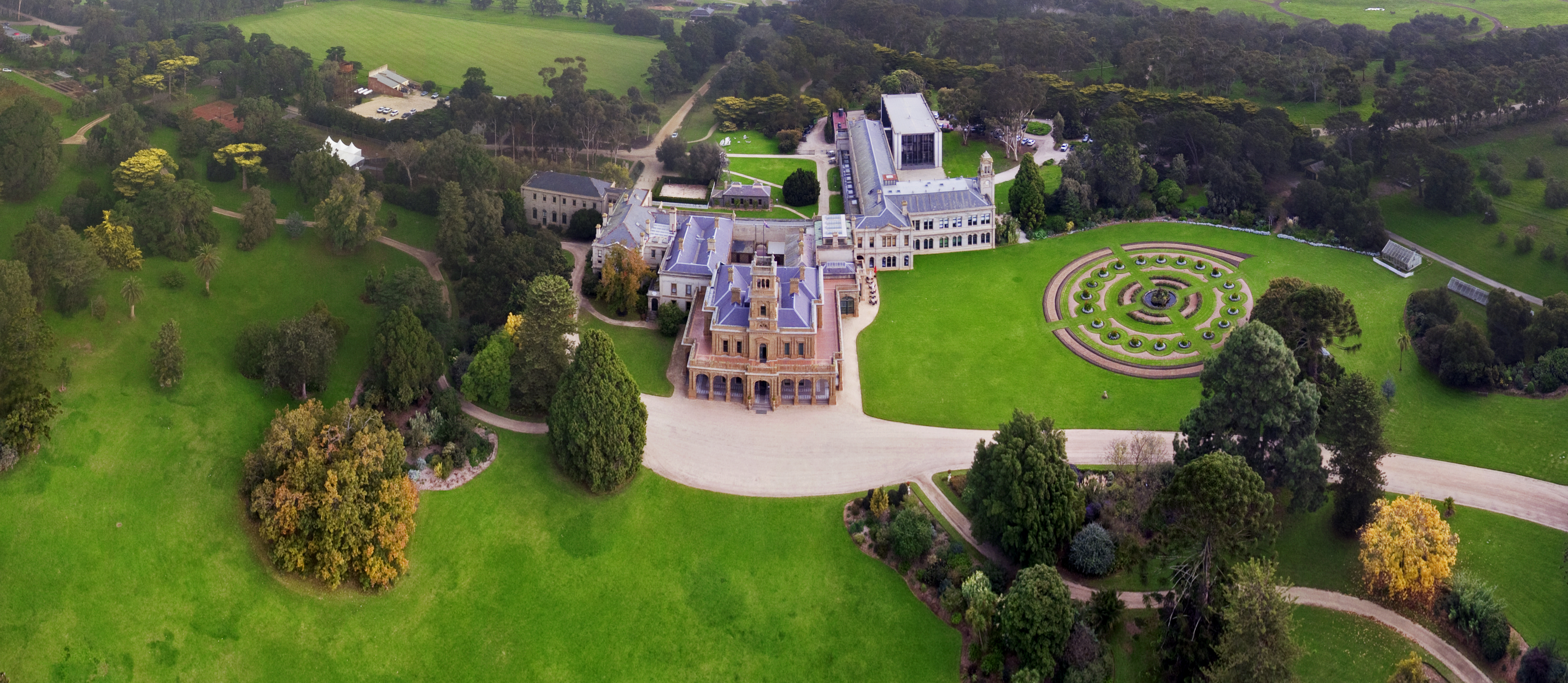
Werribee Park Mansion from above

In 1887, after Thomas Chirnside died by suicide, his brother Andrew Spencer Chirnside took over the running of the Werribee and all the holdings along with his sons. When Andrew Chirnside died in 1890 of heart disease, his jewellery and other personal items were left to his wife, Mary Chirnside (née Begbie), for the term of her life and then to his sons, George Thomas Chirnside and John Percy Chirnside. Andrew Chirnside also bequeathed to his wife a legacy of £10,000, and an annuity of £5000 during her life to be paid out to her every six months. Lastly, Andrew Chirnside devised to his sons his interest in the Werribee Park and Point Cook Estates and all the other property of the partnership firm of Andrew Chirnside & Sons. One son, George Chirnside, inherited Werribee Park Mansion and surrounding lands while the younger brother, John Percy, inherited the rocky stone land above the railway line. Not surprisingly, this led to ill feelings, and when Percy purchased land and had Hamilton build "The Manor" in 1895–1896, George took out a court order to prevent Percy from using the word "Werribee" when naming his new mansion.

From 1923 to 1973, Werribee Park Mansion was a Catholic seminary, Corpus Christi College. The wings, which are now the Mansion Hotel were added during that period.

In 1996 episodes set in England for the television series The Genie From Down Under were shot at the mansion. Rooms in the house were used for American-based film The Pirate Movie, starring Kristy McNichol and Christopher Atkins. The mansion was also used in the 1976 film The Devil's Playground.

In December 2007, the Werribee Park Mansion hosted two Elton John concerts as part of his Rocket Man Solo Tour.

Every year the Werribee Mansion Grounds are used to host the Werribee Christmas Carols event, the harvest festival, the polo championships and since 2013 on New Year's Day, the Let Them Eat Cake music festival.

== Heritage Orchard ==
Werribee Park Heritage Orchard is an antique orchard dating from the 1870s. It was renowned for its peaches, grapes, apples, quinces, pears, a variety of plums and several other fruits, as well as walnuts and olives. Over the past few decades the orchard was forgotten and - through neglect - fell into ruin. Recently this historic treasure was rediscovered. Some of the old heritage fruit varieties survive - mainly quince, pear and apple. In partnership with Parks Victoria a community group was formed in 2010 to look after the orchard.

The aims of Werribee Park Heritage Orchard are:

1. To provide support for and to foster public awareness of the orchard.
2. To assist with the preservation and enhancement of the orchard and with special projects selected by the group in consultation with Parks Victoria and other major stakeholders.
3. To involve people with an interest in the orchard.

== National Equestrian Centre ==
The Werribee Park National Equestrian Centre is an international standard sporting facility for equestrian events, including Equitana and the World Polo Championships. It was officially opened in 1984 as the designated State Centre for equestrian activity. Before 1992, it was operated by the Werribee Park Corporation and was used by the Victorian Polo Association and the Victorian branch of Equestrian Australia. In 1992, the facility was leased for 21 years to the Werribee Park National Equestrian Centre Inc. This association comprises representatives of these two bodies. King Charles III (then prince) once played polo at the Werribee Park National Equestrian Centre.

== Open Range Zoo ==
The Werribee Open Range Zoo is one of four zoos run by Zoos Victoria. It contains animals from Africa such as elephants, rhino, giraffe, antelope, zebra, lions and hippo, as well as Australian animals such as emu, koala and kangaroo, and animals from around the world, such as takhi - the Mongolian wild horse.

== Shadowfax Winery ==
Located on the grounds of Werribee Park, Shadowfax Vineyard and Winery produces a wide range of wines focused on their Macedon vineyards. They formerly made the One Eye Shiraz, a wine produced from the oldest Shiraz vines in Heathcote's Cambrian soil.

== See also ==
- Berrambool
- Chatsworth House
- Mokanger
- Mount William Homestead
