= List of places on the Victorian Heritage Register in the City of Melton =

This is a list of places on the Victorian Heritage Register in the City of Melton in Victoria, Australia. The Victorian Heritage Register is maintained by the Heritage Council of Victoria.

The Victorian Heritage Register, as of 2020, lists the following 10 state-registered places within the City of Melton:

Place name	Place #	Location	Suburb or Town	Co-ordinates	Built	State registered	Photo
Australian Beam Wireless Receiving Station	H2278	653-701 and 703-735 Greigs Rd	Fieldstone	37.750440°S 144.646080°E	1926	23 February 2012	
Deanside Homestead Complex	H0810	96-103 Reed Crt	Deanside	37.726570°S 144.697200°E	1864	5 September 1990	
Djerriwarrh Creek Bridge	H1658	disused section of Old Western Highway	Melton West and Long Forest	37.685600°S 144.516370°E	1858-59	20 August 1982	
Exford Homestead	H0316	355-455 Exford Rd	Weir Views	37.744361°S 144.573139°E	1843	9 October 1974	
Exford Shearing Shed	H2276	1182-1250 Exford Rd	Eynesbury	37.751700°S 144.572760°E	1850s	12 May 2011	
Eynesbury	H0362	Eynesbury Rd and Springhill Rd	Eynesbury	37.790040°S 144.565230°E	1872-75	9 October 1974	
Melton Viaduct	H2327	over Melton Reservoir	Brookfield, Exford and Weir Views	37.716660°S 144.541760°E	1886	8 August 2013	
Mowbray College Patterson Campus	H2319	102-112 Centenary Ave	Kurunjang	37.672640°S 144.581380°E	1983	23 January 2014	
Rockbank Inn Ruins	H1933	1902-1990 Western Highway	Aintree	37.711980°S 144.676850°E	1855	6 February 2003	
Strathtulloh	H0317	1402-1600 Greigs Rd and 439-735 Ferris Rd	Strathtulloh	37.747120°S 144.580850°E	1840	9 October 1974	
