= List of places on the Victorian Heritage Register in the City of Wyndham =

This is a list of places on the Victorian Heritage Register in the City of Wyndham in Victoria, Australia. The Victorian Heritage Register is maintained by the Heritage Council of Victoria.

The Victorian Heritage Register, as of 2020, lists the following 13 state-registered places within the City of Wyndham:

Place name	Place #	Location	Suburb or Town	Co-ordinates	Built	State registered	Photo
Callanan's Chemist	H1956	47 Watton St	Werribee	37.900920°S 144.662530°E	1939	6 December 2001	
Crossroads Uniting Church	H0628	19-21 Duncans Rd	Werribee	37.902630°S 144.662900°E	1884	1 October 1986	
Eynesbury	H0362	Eynesbury Rd and Springhill Rd	Eynesbury	37.790040°S 144.565230°E	1872-75	9 October 1974	
Geodetic Survey Baseline	H1957	Rear 301 Princes Hwy (Hoppers Crossing); 1245 Sayers Rd (Tarneit); off Springhill Rd (Eynesbury)	Hoppers Crossing; Tarneit; Eynesbury	37.885100°S 144.697520°E	1860s	15 October 2001	
Little River railway station	H1572	19-27 River St	Little River	37.962860°S 144.498980°E	1864	20 August 1982	
Main Outfall Sewer	H1932		from Laverton North to Werribee	37.821620°S 144.842470°E	1892-94	13 September 2001	
Point Cook Homestead and Stables	H1509	Point Cook Homestead Rd	Point Cook	37.925120°S 144.792180°E	c. 1857	9 October 1974	
Rothwell Bridge	H1454	Old Melbourne Rd over Little River	Little River	37.976880°S 144.508530°E	1866-67	20 August 1982	
State Research Farm	H1961	600 Sneydes Rd	Werribee	37.896200°S 144.683400°E	1912	14 February 2002	
Water Tank	H1416	Cocoroc Rd	Cocoroc	37.950710°S 144.633880°E	1854	20 August 1982	
Werribee Park	H1613	320 K Rd	Werribee South	37.896200°S 144.683400°E	1865	1 April 1987	
Werribee railway station	H1309	Comben St	Werribee	37.899700°S 144.660910°E	1857	17 April 1987	
Werribee Satellite Aerodrome	H1884	Princes Hwy	Werribee	37.910000°S 144.644350°E	1942	9 November 2000	
