= Results of the 2020 Victorian local elections in Western Melbourne =

2020 Victorian local elections (Western Melbourne)
← 2016	24 October 2020	2024 →

This is a list of results for the 2020 Victorian local elections in the Western Melbourne region.

Western Melbourne covers the local government areas (LGAs) of Brimbank, Hobsons Bay, Maribyrnong, Melton, Moonee Valley and Wyndham.

== Maribyrnong ==
2020 Victorian local elections: Maribyrnong
Party	Votes	%	Swing	Seats	Change
Independent	15,152	32.86		1	
Labor	13,746	29.82		3	
Greens	6,299	13.66		2	
Victorian Socialists	4,169	9.04		1	▲1
Independent Liberal	3,591	7.79		0	
Sustainable Australia	1,626	3.53		0	Steady
Democratic Labour	973	2.11		0	Steady
Progressives	547	1.19		0	Steady
Formal votes	46,103				

=== River ===
2020 Victorian local elections: River Ward
Party	Candidate	Votes	%	±%
Labor	Sarah Carter	3,525	26.53	
Victorian Socialists	Liz Walsh	1,409	10.61	+10.61
Independent	Matt McCaul	1,272	9.57	
Independent	Anthony Tran	1,073	8.08	
Greens	Toa Thredgold	1,031	7.76	
Democratic Labour	Thuy-Kim Le	973	7.32	
Independent	Chay Granger	906	6.82	
Independent	Andrew Tran	741	5.58	
Labor	Susan Yengi	641	4.82	
Independent	Yvonne Gu	599	4.51	
Independent	Huy Nguyen	555	4.18	
Independent	Duncan Foster	436	3.28	
Independent	Machi La	124	0.93	
Total formal votes		13,385		
Informal votes		884		
Turnout		14,169	74.74	
After distribution of preferences
Independent	Anthony Tran	4,985	37.52	
Labor	Sarah Carter	4,429	33.34	
Victorian Socialists	Liz Walsh	3,871	29.14	+29.14
Independent gain from Independent		Swing	N/A	
Labor hold		Swing	N/A	

=== Yarraville ===
2020 Victorian local elections: Yarraville Ward
Party	Candidate	Votes	%	±%
Labor	Michael Clarke	2,677	14.37	
Greens	Simon Crawford	2,651	14.23	
Independent Liberal	Angela Burmeister	1,895	10.17	
Labor	Martin Zakharov	1,887	10.13	
Victorian Socialists	Jorge Jorquera	1,632	8.76	+8.76
Sustainable Australia	Verity Webb	1,626	8.73	
Labor	Sara Coward	874	4.69	
Independent	Jeremie Nguyen	867	4.65	
Independent	Matt Waller	824	4.42	
Independent	Jo Canny	808	4.34	
Independent	Grace Girardi	728	3.91	
Independent	Miles Parnall-Gilbert	603	3.24	
Progressives	Peter Wingate	547	2.94	
Independent	Paul Nam Le	440	2.36	
Independent	Toan Nguyen	402	2.16	
Independent	Rufo Paredes	174	0.93	
Total formal votes		18,635		
Informal votes		1,351		
Turnout		19,986	78.31	
After distribution of preferences
Victorian Socialists	Jorge Jorquera	4,756	25.52	+25.52
Labor	Michael Clarke	4,659	25.00	
Greens	Simon Crawford	4,659	25.00	
Victorian Socialists gain from Independent		Swing	N/A	
Labor hold		Swing		
Greens hold		Swing		
