= Quandong, Victoria =

Quandong
- Town
- Interactive map of Quandong
- Coordinates: 37.845°S 144.522°E
- Country: Australia
- State: Victoria
- LGA: City of Wyndham
- Location: 40 km (25 mi) from Melbourne

Government
  - State electorate: Werribee
  - Federal division: Hawke

Population
  - Total: 0 (2021 census)
- Postcode: 3340
Localities around Quandong
Parwan	Eynesbury	Wyndham Vale
Balliang East	Quandong	Wyndham Vale
Little River	Little River	Mambourin

Quandong is a locality in Victoria, Australia, 40 km (25 mi) west of Melbourne's Central Business District, located within the City of Wyndham local government area. Quandong recorded no population at the 2021 census.

It shares its name with a number of wild bush plants and their edible fruits, and is also not to be confused with the locality of Quantong in the Rural City of Horsham.
