= Hopetoun Park, Victoria =

Hopetoun Park
- Suburb
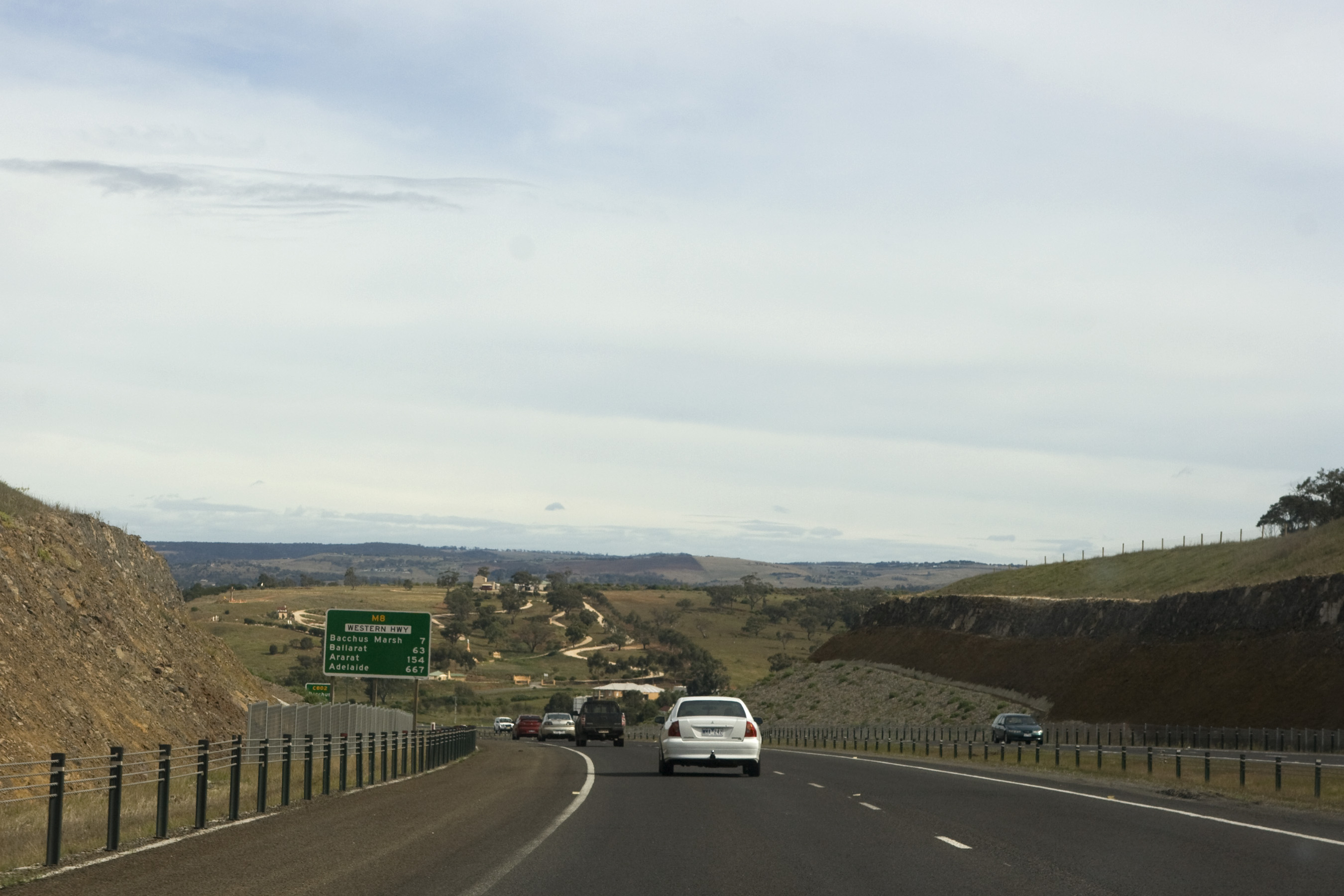
- The Western Freeway passing through Hopetoun Park

- Interactive map of Hopetoun Park
- Coordinates: 37°41′09″S 144°29′57″E
- Country: Australia
- State: Victoria
- City: Bacchus Marsh
- LGA: Shire of Moorabool
- Location: 51 km (32 mi) NW of Melbourne; 10 km (6.2 mi) W of Melton; 6 km (3.7 mi) E of Bacchus Marsh

Government
  - State electorate: Melton
  - Federal division: Hawke

Population
  - Total: 914 (2021 census)
- Postcode: 3340
Suburbs around Hopetoun Park
Merrimu	Long Forest	Melton West
Bacchus Marsh	Hopetoun Park	Brookfield
Parwan	Parwan	Exford

Hopetoun Park is a suburb of Bacchus Marsh, a peri-urban town in central Victoria, Australia. The locality consists of the area between the Bacchus Marsh urban area and Melton, north of the Werribee River (Melton Reservoir) and south of the Western Highway. It is in the Shire of Moorabool, 51 kilometres (32 mi) north west of the state capital, Melbourne.

At the 2021 census, Hopetoun Park had a population of 914.
