= City of Wyndham =

Coordinates: 37°54′S 144°40′E

- Local government area
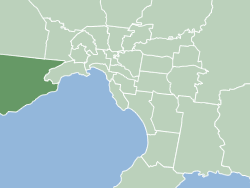
- Location of City of Wyndham within Melbourne.

- Interactive map of City of Wyndham
- Country: Australia
- State: Victoria
- Region: Greater Melbourne
- Established: 1862
- Council seat: Werribee

Government
  - Mayor: Cr Josh Gilligan
  - State electorates: Laverton; Point Cook; Tarneit; Werribee
  - Federal divisions: Corio; Gellibrand; Hawke; Lalor

Area
  - Total: 542 km^{2} (209 sq mi)

Population
  - Total: 292,011 (2021 census) (14th)
  - Density: 538.8/km^{2} (1,395.4/sq mi)
- County: Bourke, Grant
- Website: City of Wyndham
LGAs around City of Wyndham
Moorabool	Melton	Brimbank
Greater Geelong	City of Wyndham	Hobsons Bay
Greater Geelong	Port Phillip	Port Phillip

The City of Wyndham is a local government area in Victoria, Australia in the outer south-western suburbs of Melbourne, within the Melbourne Metropolitan Area, between Melbourne and the regional city of Geelong. It has an area of 542 square kilometres (209 sq mi). The city had a population of 292,011 as of the 2021 census. For the year to 2018 the City of Wyndham increased its population by 14,251, the largest number of any LGA in Victoria, as well as being the second most populous and the second fastest growing at a rate of 5.9 per cent.

== History ==
The Wyndham District was first incorporated as a local government entity on 6 October 1862. Under changes made to Local Government legislation, it became the Shire of Wyndham on 7 March 1864 and was renamed the Shire of Werribee on 15 December 1909.

With an initial size of 715 square kilometres (276 sq mi) and being largely rural in character, the shire ceded land to metropolitan Melbourne as suburban development encroached. On 6 January 1922 and 5 February 1941, the City of Footscray annexed two parcels of land totalling about 700 hectares. On 20 February 1957, the Altona Riding of the Shire of Werribee was severed and incorporated as the Shire of Altona, which became a City eleven years later. After this, the boundaries remained fairly stable, and on 20 March 1987 Werribee was proclaimed a City.

On 15 December 1994, during major restructuring of Victoria's local governments, Werribee changed less than most. It gained no new territory, and lost only some rural areas in its north-west (Balliang East to the Shire of Moorabool and Exford to the Shire of Melton) and residential areas on its eastern flank (Seabrook, the western half of Altona Meadows and the residential part of Laverton to the City of Hobsons Bay). After 85 years of being known as Werribee, the area's former name of Wyndham was restored.

The City of Werribee before the 1994 reforms (green) and the City of Wyndham's modern boundary (brown)

The Eynesbury development, approved in the 2000s, straddled the 1994 LGA boundary. On 1 July 2026, Wyndham's northern boundary was shifted southward so as to unite the entire urban-zoned area of Eynesbury in the City of Melton.

== Population ==
The City is home to numerous new housing estates in suburbs such as Williams Landing, Point Cook, Wyndham Vale, Truganina, Tarneit and Manor Lakes. The following table presents data from official census and other publications by the Australian Bureau of Statistics:

Year	Population	Annual growth rate
1871	1,476	
1933	7,853	7.0%
1954	9,414#	0.9%
1958	10,520*	2.9%
1961	13,629	9.9%
1966	18,369	7.0%
1971	25,116	7.3%
1976	31,790	5.3%
1981	40,555	5.5%
1986	52,458	5.9%
1991	60,563	3.1%
1996	73,691	4.3%
2001	84,861	3.0%
2006	112,695	6.6%
2011	161,575	8.7%
2016	217,122	6.9%
2021	292,011	6.9%

* Estimates in 1958, 1983 and 1988 Victorian Year Books.
# Excludes Altona Shire which was severed in 1957. Source: 1958 Victorian Year Book.
^ Based on 2011 Census data.

== Wards and councillors ==
The City of Wyndham is divided into three wards (Chaffey, Harrison and Iramoo) and is represented by eleven elected councillors. The Victorian Electoral Commission undertook a representation review in 2011–2012, which resulted in the former Truganina ward being renamed Harrison ward. Ward boundaries were also redrawn. The council has adopted a portfolio system for councillors from 2013 onward.

Victorian local government elections were last held in October 2024, and the following were elected as councillors:

Ward	Party	Councillor	Notes
Bemin	Liberal	Preet Singh	Mayor
Brinbeal	Labor	Robert Szatkowski	
Cheetham	Independent	Susan McIntyre	
Featherbrook	Independent	Jasmine Hill	Deupty Mayor
Grange	Independent	Shannon McGuire	
Heathdale	Independent	Jennie Barrera	
Iramoo	Independent	Maria King	
Quandong	Labor	Peter Maynard	
Werribee Park	Liberal	Mia Shaw	
Williams Landing	Labor	Larry Zhao	
Wimba	Labor	Josh Gilligan	

=== Mayors ===
- 2012–2013: Heather Marcus
- 2013–2014: Bob Fairclough
- 2014–2015: Peter Maynard
- 2015–2016: Adele Hegedich
- 2016–2017: Henry Barlow
- 2017–2018: Peter Maynard
- 2018–2019: Mia Shaw
- 2019–2020: Josh Gilligan
- 2020–2021: Adele Hegedich
- 2021-2022: Peter Maynard
- 2022-2023: Susan McIntyre
- 2023-2024: Dr. Jennie Barrera
- 2024-2025: Mia Shaw
- 2025-2026: Josh Gilligan (Cr Josh Gilligan's term as mayor ended early upon a one month suspension effective 25 February 2026)
- 2026-2026 Preet Singh

== Townships and localities ==
The 2021 census, the city had a population of 292,011 up from 217,122 in the 2016 census

Population
Locality	2016	2021
Cocoroc	0	0
Eynesbury^	2,577	2,838
Hoppers Crossing	38,701	37,216
Laverton^	4,915	4,760
Laverton North	73	119
Little River^	1,322	1,353
Mambourin	4	315
Manor Lakes	*	12,675
Mount Cottrell^	569	496
Point Cook	49,929	66,781
Quandong	0	5
Tarneit	34,562	56,370
Truganina^	20,687	36,305
Werribee	40,345	50,027
Werribee South	1,768	2,392
Williams Landing	6,646	9,448
Wyndham Vale	23,273	20,518

^ - Territory divided with another LGA
* - Not noted in 2016 Census

== Sister cities ==
- (China) Changzhou
- Costa Mesa, California, United States
- Chiryū, Aichi Prefecture, Chūbu region, Japan

== See also ==
- Wyndham City Council
- List of places on the Victorian Heritage Register in the City of Wyndham
- Wyndham City Libraries
