= Exford =

Exford may refer to:

- Exford, Victoria, a town in Australia
- Exford, Somerset, a village in England
