= Point Cook Town Centre =

Coordinates: 37°53′2″S 144°44′9″E

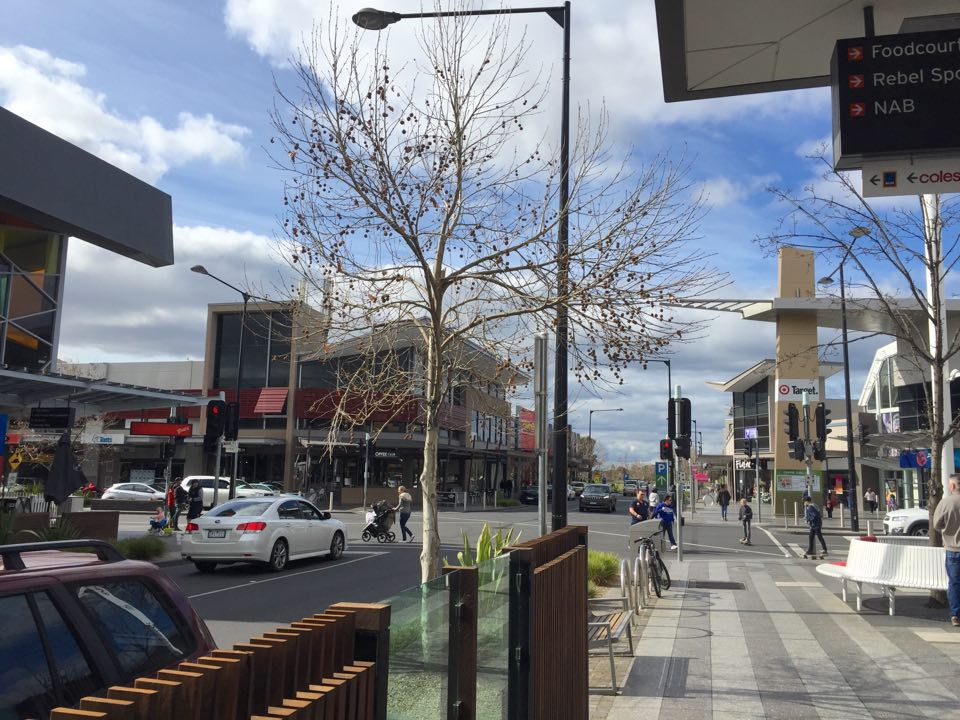
- Location: Melbourne, Victoria, Australia
- Address: Main Street and Murnong Street, Point Cook
- Opened: Stage 1, August 1, 2008, Stage 2, November 2010
- Developer: Walker Corporation and VicUrban, now Places Victoria
- Manager: Stockland
- Owner: Stockland
- Num. of stores: 150+
- Num. of anchor tenants: 4
- Floor area: ~25,000 m^{2} (270,000 sq ft)
- Floors: 3 (Ground and Level 1)
- Website: stockland-point-cook-town-centre

Point Cook Town Centre is a shopping centre in the centre of Point Cook in the west of Melbourne, Victoria, Australia. It currently contains 150 stores in total and 2 supermarkets, Coles, Woolworths , as well as a Target department store. Although the official name the centre is Stockland Point Cook, it is known locally as Point Cook Town Centre.

== Background ==
Point Cook has been subject to rapid growth. In 2001, Point Cook's population was 1,963 compared to the population in 2006, 14,735 and the expected population in 2015 being 45,805. Therefore, the need for a new shopping destination was essential to take the overflow off Pacific Werribee, Sanctuary Lakes Shopping Centre, Altona Gate and Central Square Shopping Centre. In June 2011, Stockland bought Point Cook Town Centre for $176 million.

== Construction ==
VicUrban and Walker Corporation constructed the $150 million Point Cook on a 10 hectare site located 23 kilometres south-west of Melbourne's CBD. The design for Point Cook shopping centre is a town centre with a ‘main street’ theme with both sides of the street having small retailers with an undercover walkway. Stage one of the construction was finished in mid-2008 with a Coles, Target, Aldi and a further 90 specialty stores and the cost was $90 million. Stage two of the construction was completed in November 2010 with a further Harris Scarfe (now closed), a food court, and over 40 speciality stores adding to the town centre. The cost of stage two of the shopping centre was $50 million and overall, it costed about $150 million. The neighbouring library and community centre was built roughly about the same time and is a one-minute walk from the shopping centre.

== Centre Layout ==
The area is split into 4 main precincts. The Coles precinct, including Coles and a few specialty stores and food and drink chains. The Target precinct, with a Target, EB Games Australia, Telstra, Centre Management and more. It also includes a few fashion stores. The Woolworths precinct, with a Woolworths, Rebel Sport, Food Court and other stores/facilities. Finally, there's another precinct, with a TK Maxx, Fresh Food market and Reject Shop. The centre also has a Library and Community Centre building. The centre is also surrounded by car parks, the Boardwalk Wetlands and Dunnings Road.

== Transport ==
Stockland Point Cook is approx 30 minutes drive time (27 km) from Melbourne along the Princes Freeway.
