= Melton Viaduct =

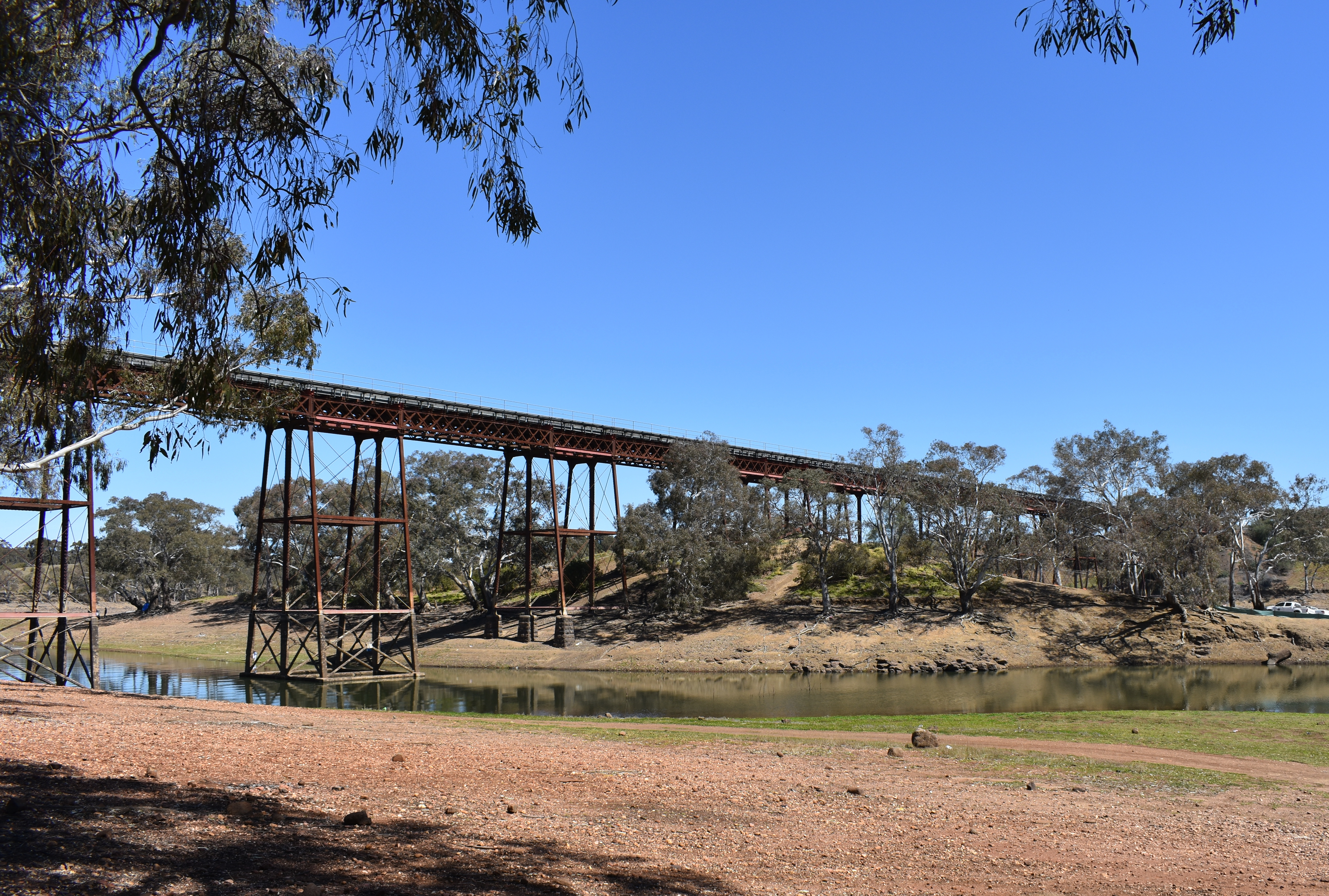
- The bridge from the left bank of the Werribee River

- Location within Victoria
- 37°43′00″S 144°32′30″E
- Location: Serviceton railway line, Brookfield, City of Melton, Victoria, Australia

History
- Built: 1885

Site notes
- Owner: Victorian Railways

Victorian Heritage Register
- Official name: Railway viaduct over Melton Reservoir
- Designated: 8 October 2013
- Reference no.: H2327

Melton Viaduct is a railway viaduct south west of the city of Melton in Victoria, Australia. The 375-metre (1,230 ft) viaduct carries the Serviceton railway line over the valley of the Werribee River, now dammed to create Melton Reservoir. The girder and trestle viaduct was built in 1885 by Victorian Railways to establish a direct rail route between the cities of Melbourne and Ballarat.

The viaduct was listed on the Victorian Heritage Register in 2013.
