= Simon Staughton =

Australian pioneer (1797–1863)

- Born: 1797
- Died: 1863 (aged 65–66); St Kilda, Victoria
- Occupation: Pastoralist
- Children: Samuel Thomas Staughton Sr.

Simon Staughton (1797–1863) was a pioneer of the district surrounding Exford, in Victoria, Australia.

== Biography ==
Staughton came to what is now Victoria (then part of the Colony of New South Wales) in 1841 with his wife Mary Susan, daughter Mary Susan and three sons, Simon Frederick, Samuel Thomas and Stephen George. After a long journey from England in the sailing ship Himalaya they landed at Liardet's Beach, now Port Melbourne. Their first home was in Little Collins Street near King Street, then known as Twopenny row. Later that year he purchased Eynesbury. He acquired the Brisbane Ranges and Exford runs, in the Exford district. By the 1850s he owned 60,000 sheep. Exford, Eynesbury, Lindisfern and Staughton Vale were parts of the earliest Port Phillip grazing runs. He was constantly improving his estates and carried the best stock. He also invested in city property, some of which is retained by his descendants.

The Staughton family became prominent in the time of Richard I when a member of the family received a large grant of land about 20 miles from Bedford, England. The family remained at Staughton Manor until 1823 when two brothers who owned Staughton Manor had what they thought was an unbeatable greyhound. The brothers backed their dog in an event with all the money they possessed and lost. The next day they backed the dog and lost again and were forced to sell the estate. Simon Staughton accumulated considerable wealth in the next few years by trading and brought 40,000 sovereigns to Australia.

He died in May 1863 at St Kilda, Victoria.
