= Balliang East =

Balliang East Victoria
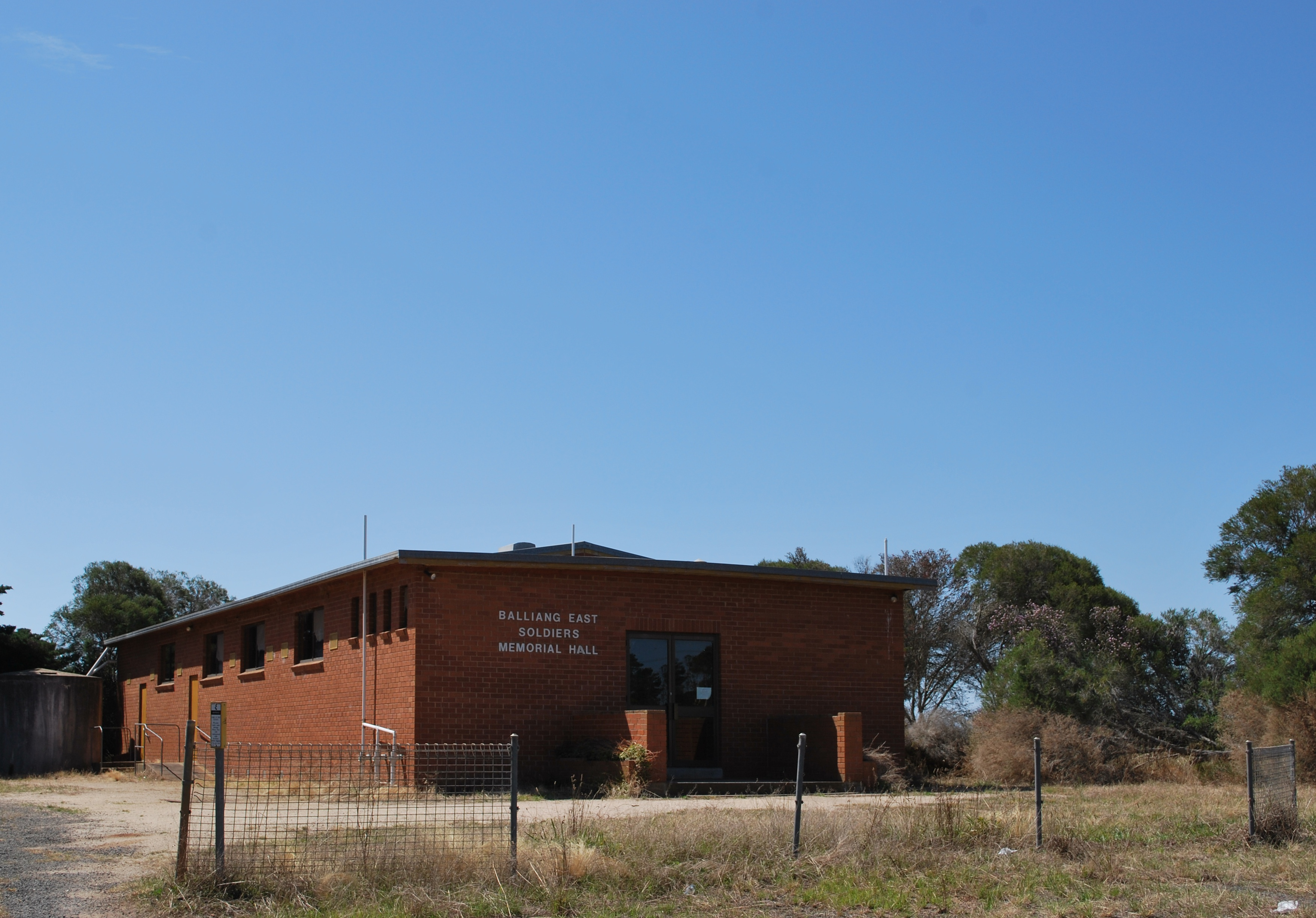
- Soldiers Memorial Hall at Balliang East

- Coordinates: 37°48′54″S 144°23′56″E
- Population: 199 (2021 census)
- Postcode(s): 3340
- Location: 45 km (28 mi) W of Melbourne
- LGA(s): Shire of Moorabool
- State electorate(s): Melton
- Federal division(s): Hawke
Localities around Balliang East:
Parwan; Balliang	Parwan	Parwan
Balliang	Balliang East	Eynesbury
Balliang	Balliang	Quandong

Balliang East is a locality 45 km west of Melbourne. The Local Government Area is the Shire of Moorabool while the population of the town is 199. Balliang East post office opened on the 1 August 1911 and closed on 24 November 1958. The people of Balliang East are mostly Catholic, Anglican while the majority of the rest have no religion.
