= Mambourin railway station =

Former railway station in Victoria, Australia

Mambourin

General information
- Other names: Pearce's Bros. Siding (1888–1892)
- System: Closed railway siding
- Line: Geelong
- Distance: 41.04 kilometres from Southern Cross

Other information
- Status: Closed

History
- Opened: November 1888; 137 years ago
- Closed: 1893; 133 years ago

Mambourin was a railway siding located on the Geelong line in Victoria, Australia. It was opened in 1888 and closed in 1893.

Since 2020, a proposal has existed to build a railway station in the newly developed suburb of Mambourin.

== History ==
The siding opened for operation in November 1888 as "Pearce's Bros. Siding" to serve a nearby quarry. It was renamed to Mambourin in 1892.

The siding was closed in 1893. The quarry was later served by a siding from Manor station, which was parallel with the main line, until it ceased operating around the 1930s.

== Future ==
In 2020, houses began to be constructed in Mambourin, which is being developed as a new suburb and experiencing rapid growth. The suburb was planned to be built around a new train station on the existing Regional Rail Link. As of December 2025, there have been no updates from the Victorian Government on the station's funding or development.

== See also ==
- List of closed railway stations in Melbourne
