= Samuel Thomas Staughton Sr. =

Australian politician (1838–1901)

Samuel Thomas Staughton (17 November 1838 – 29 August 1901) was an English-born pioneer of the district surrounding Melton, Victoria, Australia. He was also a long-time member of the Victorian Legislative Assembly.

== Biography ==
Samuel Thomas Staughton MLA, second son of Simon Staughton, was born on 17 November 1838 in Hertford, England. (Note: His date of birth is generally given as 17 November 1838, however his obituary in The Leader gives it as 9 November 1837.) He came to Australia with his family in around 1841. In 1863 he inherited a large share of his father's property including Eynesbury. He returned to England, aged 13 for schooling at Mill Hill Grammar School and later King's College London. He was called to the Bar at Lincoln's Inn in 1860, but did not practice.

He married Eliza Mary Ann Hopkins, daughter of John Rout Hopkins, on 23 April 1874. He had seven children. Through his eldest daughter Ellie Mary Seton Williams née Staughton, he was the grandfather of Veronica Seton-Williams, an Australian Archaeologist. He was president of the Shire of Werribee from 1884 to 1885 and a member of the Braybrook District Road Board.

He was member of the Victorian Legislative Assembly for West Bourke for over 20 years.

He died on 29 August 1901 (aged 62) at his home "St Neots" in Domain Road in South Yarra after suffering from influenza, which became bronchial asthma. He is buried in the Kew cemetery. His estate was valued at £116,000.

His son, also named Samuel Thomas, succeeded him as the member for West Bourke.

== Notes ==
Victorian Legislative Assembly
Preceded by Donald Cameron; John Smith; Mark King	Member for West Bourke; May 1880 – Jun 1880; With: Alfred Deakin / Robert Harper	Succeeded by Bryan O'Loghlen; Alfred Deakin
Preceded by Bryan O'Loghlen; Alfred Deakin	Member for West Bourke; 1883–1901	Succeeded by Samuel Staughton Jr.
