= Results of the 2024 Victorian local elections in Western Melbourne =

2024 Victorian local elections (Western Melbourne)
- October 2024

This is a list of results for the 2024 Victorian local elections in the Western Melbourne region.

Western Melbourne covers the local government areas (LGAs) of Brimbank, Hobsons Bay, Maribyrnong, Melton, Moonee Valley and Wyndham.

== Brimbank ==
2024 Brimbank City Council election
- October 2024

All 11 seats on Brimbank City Council 6 seats needed for a majority
Largest party before election
No overall control
Subsequent largest party
No overall control

Brimbank City Council is composed of eleven single-member wards. Prior to the 2024 election, it was composed of four multi-member wards (three three-member wards and one two-member ward), but the electoral structure has changed as a result of the Local Government Act 2020.

=== Brimbank results ===
2024 Victorian local elections: Brimbank
Party	Votes	%	Swing	Seats	Change
Independents	54,016	53.56		4	Steady
Independent Labor	26,186	25.97		5	Steady
Independent Liberal	11,373	11.28		1	▼1
Victorian Socialists	6,610	6.55		0	Steady
Greens	2,658	2.64		1	▲1
Formal votes	100,843	96.50			
Informal votes	3,662	3.50			
Total	104,505	100.00		11	Steady
Registered voters / turnout	126,621	79.64			

=== Albanvale ===
2024 Victorian local elections: Albanvale Ward
Party	Candidate	Votes	%	±%
Independent	Victoria Borg	5,166	60.83	
Independent Labor	Kristian Raspa	1,754	20.65	
Independent	Mariam Hussein	1,573	18.52	
Total formal votes		8,493	95.58	
Informal votes		393	4.42	
Turnout		8,886	82.35	
Independent win		(new ward)		

=== Cherry Creek ===
2024 Victorian local elections: Cherry Creek Ward
Party	Candidate	Votes	%	±%
Independent Labor	Kim Thien Truong	2,733	28.18	
Independent	Graeme Blore	2,443	25.19	
Independent	Thomas O'Reilly	2,002	20.64	
Independent	Andrea Markham	1,824	18.81	
Independent	Eiren Mendoza	697	7.19	
Total formal votes		9,699	97.43	
Informal votes		256	2.57	
Turnout		9,955	82.89	
Two-candidate-preferred result
Independent Labor	Kim Thien Truong	4,926	50.79	
Independent	Graeme Blore	4,773	49.21	
Independent Labor win		(new ward)		

=== Copernicus ===
2024 Victorian local elections: Copernicus Ward
Party	Candidate	Votes	%	±%
Independent Liberal	Maria Kerr	1,972	20.61	
Independent	Georgina Papafotiou	1,430	14.95	
Independent	Adrian Gauci	1,151	12.03	
Independent	Chien Duc Cao	1,050	10.97	
Independent Liberal	Dimitri Andreevski	851	8.89	
Independent	Margaret Giudice	798	8.34	
Independent	Aristea Havelas	668	6.98	
Independent	Sonja Nikolic	419	4.38	
Independent Liberal	Dianne Cappelli	404	4.22	
Independent	Stefan Christopher Koroneos	341	3.56	
Independent Labor	Draga Atanasovska	315	3.29	
Independent	Bhasker Reddy Bethi	169	1.77	
Total formal votes		9,568	94.28	
Informal votes		580	5.72	
Turnout		10,148	84.27	
Two-candidate-preferred result
Independent Liberal	Maria Kerr	5,667	59.23	
Independent	Georgina Papafotiou	3,901	40.77	
Independent Liberal win		(new ward)		

=== Delahey ===
2024 Victorian local elections: Delahey Ward
Party	Candidate	Votes	%	±%
Independent Labor	Katharine Nikolic	2,591	28.93	
Independent Liberal	Angelina Greenwood	1,659	18.53	
Independent	Don Vu	1,596	17.82	
Independent	Jason Acevski	1,111	12.41	
Independent	Poonam D. Singh	936	10.45	
Independent Liberal	Robert Galati	583	6.51	
Independent Labor	Vasko Naumovski	479	5.35	
Total formal votes		8,955	96.72	
Informal votes		304	3.28	
Turnout		9,259	83.87	
Two-candidate-preferred result
Independent Labor	Katharine Nikolic	5,279	58.95	
Independent Liberal	Angelina Greenwood	3,676	41.05	
Independent Labor win		(new ward)		

=== Grasslands ===
2024 Victorian local elections: Grasslands Ward
Party	Candidate	Votes	%	±%
Independent Labor	Thuy Dang	3,318	35.38	
Independent	Phung Hoa Lu	2,234	23.82	
Victorian Socialists	Leanna Nguyen	2,066	22.03	
Independent	Tauseef Ashraf	1,759	18.76	
Total formal votes		9,377	96.04	
Informal votes		387	3.96	
Turnout		9,764	81.82	
Two-candidate-preferred result
Independent Labor	Thuy Dang	5,317	56.70	
Independent	Phung Hoa Lu	4,060	43.30	
Independent Labor win		(new ward)		

=== Harvester ===
2024 Victorian local elections: Harvester Ward
Party	Candidate	Votes	%	±%
Independent Labor	Daniel Kruk	2,656	29.17	
Victorian Socialists	Liz Walsh	2,397	26.33	
Independent Labor	Ian Douglas	2,263	24.86	
Independent	Benoit Seligmann	1,788	19.64	
Total formal votes		9,104	97.16	
Informal votes		266	2.84	
Turnout		9,370	80.94	
Two-candidate-preferred result
Independent Labor	Daniel Kruk	4,842	53.19	
Victorian Socialists	Liz Walsh	4,262	46.81	
Independent Labor win		(new ward)		

=== Horseshoe Bend ===
2024 Victorian local elections: Horseshoe Bend Ward
Party	Candidate	Votes	%	±%
Independent	Virginia Tachos	3,991	39.83	
Independent	Fred Ackerman	3,426	34.19	
Independent	Rosa Bruno	1,517	15.14	
Independent	Lina Melhem	1,087	10.85	
Total formal votes		10,021	97.41	
Informal votes		266	2.59	
Turnout		10,287	86.01	
Two-candidate-preferred result
Independent	Virginia Tachos	5,401	53.90	
Independent	Fred Ackerman	4,620	46.10	
Independent win		(new ward)		

=== Kororoit Creek ===
2024 Victorian local elections: Kororoit Creek Ward
Party	Candidate	Votes	%	±%
Greens	Lucy Nguyen	2,658	33.73	
Independent Labor	Sam David	1,946	24.69	
Independent	Christopher O'Reilly	1,547	19.63	
Victorian Socialists	Paul Hollingworth	889	11.28	
Independent	Ben Bligh	841	10.67	
Total formal votes		7,881	96.79	
Informal votes		261	3.21	
Turnout		8,142	77.65	
Two-candidate-preferred result
Greens	Lucy Nguyen	4,371	55.46	
Independent Labor	Sam David	3,510	44.54	
Greens win		(new ward)		

=== Mount Derrimut ===
2024 Victorian local elections: Mount Derrimut Ward
Party	Candidate	Votes	%	±%
Independent	Joh Bauch	3,291	36.41	
Independent Labor	Tayla Vorgiatzidis	2,088	23.10	
Independent Liberal	Mark Bernhard Jekic	1,632	18.06	
Independent	Sam Charles Joseph Muscat	1,302	14.40	
Independent Labor	Les Tarczon	726	8.03	
Total formal votes		9,039	97.19	
Informal votes		261	2.81	
Turnout		9,300	82.04	
Two-candidate-preferred result
Independent	Joh Bauch	5,261	58.20	
Independent Labor	Tayla Vorgiatzidis	3,778	41.80	
Independent win		(new ward)		

=== Organ Pipes ===
2024 Victorian local elections: Organ Pipes Ward
Party	Candidate	Votes	%	±%
Independent Labor	Ranka Rasic	4,516	45.81	
Independent Liberal	Joe Cullia	1,689	17.13	
Independent Liberal	Joseph Camenzuli	1,550	15.72	
Independent Liberal	Peter Coventry	1,033	10.48	
Independent Labor	Frank Leo	801	8.13	
Independent	Srujan Reddy Chittedi	269	2.73	
Total formal votes		9,858	96.98	
Informal votes		307	3.02	
Turnout		10,165	85.14	
After distribution of preferences
Independent Labor	Ranka Rasic	5,239	53.14	
Independent Liberal	Joe Cullia	2,345	23.79	
Independent Liberal	Joseph Camenzuli	2,274	23.07	
Independent Labor win		(new ward)		

=== St Albans East ===
2024 Victorian local elections: St Albans East Ward
Party	Candidate	Votes	%	±%
Independent	Duyen Anh Pham	2,102	23.76	
Independent	Trinh Le	1,758	19.87	
Independent	Nghi Neil Ta	1,691	19.11	
Independent	Nick Tribe	1,633	18.46	
Victorian Socialists	Van Thanh Rudd	1,258	14.22	
Independent	Sajid Hussain	406	4.59	
Total formal votes		8,848	95.87	
Informal votes		381	4.13	
Turnout		9,229	80.20	
Two-candidate-preferred result
Independent	Duyen Anh Pham	4,964	56.10	
Independent	Nghi Neil Ta	3,884	43.90	
Independent win		(new ward)		

== Hobsons Bay ==
2024 Hobsons Bay City Council election
- October 2024

All 7 seats on Hobsons Bay City Council 4 seats needed for a majority
Largest party before election
Independents
Subsequent largest party
Independents

Hobsons Bay City Council is composed of seven single-member wards. Prior to the 2024 election, it was composed of three multi-member wards (two two-member wards and one three-member ward), but the electoral structure has changed as a result of the Local Government Act 2020.

=== Hobsons Bay results ===
2024 Victorian local elections: Hobsons Bay
Party	Votes	%	Swing	Seats	Change
Independent	34,781	66.88		5	Steady
Independent Labor	9,089	17.48		2	▲1
Greens	4,043	7.77		0	▼1
Libertarian	1,581	3.04		0	Steady
Animal Justice	1,055	2.03		0	Steady
Independent Liberal	825	1.59		0	Steady
Victorian Socialists	629	1.21		0	Steady
Formal votes	52,003	97.27			
Informal votes	1,460	2.73			
Total	53,463	100.00		7	Steady
Registered voters / turnout	64,932	82.34			

=== Altona ===
2024 Victorian local elections: Altona Ward
Party	Candidate	Votes	%	±%
Independent	Daria Kellander	3,513	43.46	
Independent	Tim R. Rippon	1,911	23.64	
Animal Justice	Irene Brown	1,055	13.05	
Independent	Phillip Paull	975	12.06	
Victorian Socialists	Susan Miller	629	7.78	
Total formal votes		8,083	97.56	
Informal votes		202	2.44	
Turnout		8,285	83.07	
After distribution of preferences
Independent	Daria Kellander	4,085	50.54	
Independent	Tim R. Rippon	2,459	30.42	
Animal Justice	Irene Brown	1,539	19.04	
Independent win		(new ward)		

=== Altona Meadows ===
2024 Victorian local elections: Altona Meadows Ward
Party	Candidate	Votes	%	±%
Independent	Diana Grima	4,402	53.87	
Libertarian	Liam Roche	1,581	19.35	
Independent	Ranbir Lambra	1,126	13.78	
Independent	Matthew Phelan	1,063	13.01	
Total formal votes		8,172	97.56	
Informal votes		204	2.44	
Turnout		8,376	84.73	
Independent win		(new ward)		

=== Altona North ===
2024 Victorian local elections: Altona North Ward
Party	Candidate	Votes	%	±%
Independent Labor	Rayane Hawli	2,941	42.59	
Independent	Alexandra Damasoliotis	1,980	28.67	
Greens	Rowena Joske	1,107	16.03	
Independent	Ryan Thistlethwaite	878	12.71	
Total formal votes		6,906	98.08	
Informal votes		135	1.92	
Turnout		7,041	80.57	
Two-candidate-preferred result
Independent Labor	Rayane Hawli	3,748	54.27	
Independent	Alexandra Damasoliotis	3,158	45.73	
Independent Labor win		(new ward)		

=== Laverton ===
2024 Victorian local elections: Laverton Ward
Party	Candidate	Votes	%	±%
Independent Labor	Paddy Keys-Macpherson	4,170	59.28	
Independent	Tori Mikula	2,864	40.72	
Independent	Paula Morgan (ineligible) (Note: Candidate was ineligible to contest the election after not completing mandatory candidate training. They still appeared on the ballot as they were only "retired" by the Victorian Electoral Commission after ballot papers had been printed, however they could not serve as a councillor and their votes were distributed to other candidates according to voters' preferences.)	N/A	N/A	
Total formal votes		7,034	96.89	
Informal votes		226	3.11	
Turnout		7,260	79.22	
Independent Labor win		(new ward)		

=== Spotswood ===
2024 Victorian local elections: Spotswood Ward
Party	Candidate	Votes	%	±%
Independent Labor	Rosa McKenna	1,978	26.78	
Independent	Omar Baarini	1,815	24.57	
Independent	Kristin Bishop	1,558	21.09	
Independent	Daniel Kade	1,294	17.52	
Independent	Hayley Royal	742	10.04	
Total formal votes		7,387	97.27	
Informal votes		207	2.73	
Turnout		7,594	81.99	
Two-candidate-preferred result
Independent	Kristin Bishop	3,917	53.03	
Independent Labor	Rosa McKenna	3,470	46.97	
Independent win		(new ward)		

=== Williamstown ===
2024 Victorian local elections: Williamstown Ward
Party	Candidate	Votes	%	±%
Independent	Lisa Bentley	3,954	57.39	
Greens	Ingrid Magtengaard	2,936	42.61	
Total formal votes		6,890	96.66	
Informal votes		238	3.34	
Turnout		7,128	83.03	
Independent win		(new ward)		

=== Williamstown North ===
2024 Victorian local elections: Williamstown North Ward
Party	Candidate	Votes	%	±%
Independent	Michael Disbury	4,073	54.08	
Independent	Alexander Ansalone	1,742	23.13	
Independent	Nicholas Norton	891	11.83	
Independent Liberal	Wajde Ghazi Assaf	825	10.95	
Total formal votes		7,531	96.81	
Informal votes		248	3.19	
Turnout		7,779	83.43	
Independent win		(new ward)		

== Maribyrnong ==
2024 Maribyrnong City Council election
- 26 October 2024

All 7 seats on Maribyrnong City Council 4 seats needed for a majority
- Registered: 59,078
- Turnout: 78.32%

	First party	Second party
		IND
Party	Community Labor	Independents
Last election	3 seats	1 seat
Seats before	4	0
Seats won	3	1
Seat change	▼1	▲1
First preference vote	15,914	11,161
Percentage	35.35%	24.79%
Swing	▲5.53	▼8.07
	Third party	Fourth party
		VS
Party	Greens	Socialists
Last election	2 seats	1 seat
Seats before	2	1
Seats won	3	0
Seat change	▲1	▼1
First preference vote	9,947	5,718
Percentage	22.10%	12.70%
Swing	▲8.44	▲3.66
Largest party before election
Labor
Subsequent largest party
No overall control

Maribyrnong City Council is composed of seven single-member wards. Prior to the 2024 election, it was composed of three multi-member wards (two two-member wards and one three-member ward), but the electoral structure has changed as a result of the Local Government Act 2020.

On 6 August 2024, Labor councillor and former mayor Sarah Carter died. No countback was held in River Ward because of the proximity of the 2024 election.

The Labor Party, which endorsed six candidates in 2020, did not recontest Maribyrnong. A group of Labor members known as "Community Labor for Maribyrnong" endorsed 11 candidates.

=== Maribyrnong results ===
2024 Victorian local elections: Maribyrnong
Party	Votes	%	Swing	Seats	Change
Community Labor	15,914	35.35	+5.53	3	Steady
Independents	10,190	22.74	−10.12	1	Steady
Greens	9,947	22.10	+8.43	3	▲1
Victorian Socialists	5,718	12.70	+3.67	0	▼1
Independent Labor	1,438	3.19	+3.19	0	Steady
Ind. Democratic Labour	926	2.05	-0.06	0	Steady
Independent Liberal	837	1.86	−5.93	0	Steady
Formal votes	45,015	97.28			
Informal votes	1,255	2.72			
Total	46,270	100.00		7	Steady
Registered voters / turnout	59,078	78.32			

=== Bluestone ===
2024 Victorian local elections: Bluestone Ward
Party	Candidate	Votes	%	±%
Independent	Catherine Cumming	1,857	27.25	
Community Labor	Pradeep Tiwari	1,465	21.50	
Greens	Pierre Vario	1,337	19.62	
Community Labor	Wallace Huang	1,311	19.24	
Victorian Socialists	Brad Reich	845	12.40	
Total formal votes		6,815	97.93	
Informal votes		144	2.07	
Turnout		6,959	80.67	
Two-candidate-preferred result
Community Labor	Pradeep Tiwari	3,716	54.53	
Independent	Catherine Cumming	3,099	45.47	
Community Labor win		(new ward)		

=== Braybrook ===
2024 Victorian local elections: Braybrook Ward
Party	Candidate	Votes	%	±%
Community Labor	Cuc Lam	3,199	46.83	
Greens	Chris Wilson	1,339	19.60	
Victorian Socialists	Catherine Robertson	1,328	19.44	
Independent	Lochlann Hamish Clarke	965	14.13	
Total formal votes		6,831	96.85	
Informal votes		222	3.15	
Turnout		7,053	78.41	
After distribution of preferences
Community Labor	Cuc Lam	3,547	51.93	
Greens	Chris Wilson	1,793	26.25	
Victorian Socialists	Catherine Robertson	1,491	21.83	
Community Labor win		(new ward)		

=== Burndap ===
2024 Victorian local elections: Burndap Ward
Party	Candidate	Votes	%	±%
Independent	Mohamed Semra	1,142	17.78	
Victorian Socialists	Jorge Jorquera	1,080	16.82	
Ind. Democratic Labour	Thuy-Kim Le	926	14.42	
Community Labor	Pete Thomas	886	13.80	
Independent Liberal	Minh Quan Nguyen	837	13.03	
Independent	Fletcher Bubb	806	12.55	
Greens	Sally Walshe	745	11.60	
Total formal votes		6,422	97.07	
Informal votes		194	2.93	
Turnout		6,616	76.93	
Two-candidate-preferred result
Independent	Mohamed Semra	3,433	53.46	
Ind. Democratic Labour	Thuy-Kim Le	2,989	46.54	
Independent win		(new ward)		

=== River ===
2024 Victorian local elections: River Ward
Party	Candidate	Votes	%	±%
Community Labor	Susan Yengi	1,832	27.93	
Community Labor	Anthony Tran	1,464	22.32	
Independent	Cameron McDonald	1,428	21.77	
Greens	Danny Cash	713	10.87	
Independent	Ken Betts	428	6.53	
Independent	Edward Merrifield	383	5.84	
Victorian Socialists	Brendan Laws	311	4.74	
Total formal votes		6,559	97.26	
Informal votes		185	2.74	
Turnout		6,744	78.73	
Two-candidate-preferred result
Community Labor	Susan Yengi	3,491	53.22	
Independent	Cameron McDonald	3,068	46.78	
Community Labor win		(new ward)		

=== Saltwater ===
2024 Victorian local elections: Saltwater Ward
Party	Candidate	Votes	%	±%
Greens	Samantha Meredith	1,647	27.40	
Independent Labor	John Cumming	1,438	23.93	
Community Labor	Aman Gaur	1,106	18.40	
Independent	Jenny Harrison	857	14.26	
Victorian Socialists	Lucinda Kelly	635	10.57	
Independent	Terri Soumilas	327	5.44	
Total formal votes		6,010	96.97	
Informal votes		188	3.03	
Turnout		6,198	76.51	
Two-candidate-preferred result
Greens	Samantha Meredith	3,366	56.01	
Independent Labor	John Cumming	2,644	43.99	
Greens win		(new ward)		

=== Sheoak ===
2024 Victorian local elections: Sheoak Ward
Party	Candidate	Votes	%	±%
Greens	Bernadette Thomas	2,231	37.58	
Community Labor	Paul Nam Le	1,769	29.80	
Community Labor	Ari Casanova	1,092	18.39	
Victorian Socialists	Oskar Martin	845	14.23	
Total formal votes		5,937	97.06	
Informal votes		180	2.94	
Turnout		6,117	76.63	
Two-candidate-preferred result
Greens	Bernadette Thomas	3,660	61.65	
Community Labor	Paul Nam Le	2,277	38.35	
Greens win		(new ward)		

=== Wattle ===
2024 Victorian local elections: Wattle Ward
Party	Candidate	Votes	%	±%
Independent	Miles Parnall-Gilbert	2,042	31.70	
Greens	Elena Pereyra	1,935	30.04	
Community Labor	Michael Clarke	1,515	23.52	
Victorian Socialists	Julien Macandili	674	10.46	
Community Labor	Clint Lingard	275	4.27	
Total formal votes		6,441	97.84	
Informal votes		142	2.16	
Turnout		6,583	80.20	
Two-candidate-preferred result
Greens	Elena Pereyra	3,275	50.85	
Independent	Miles Parnall-Gilbert	3,166	49.15	
Greens win		(new ward)		

== Melton ==
2024 Melton City Council election
- October 2024

All 10 seats on Melton City Council 6 seats needed for a majority
Largest party before election
No overall control
Subsequent largest party
No overall control

Melton City Council is composed of ten single-member wards. The council increased from nine members to ten prior to the 2024 election; members had previously been elected across three wards (one two-member, one three-member and one four-member).

=== Melton results ===
2024 Victorian local elections: Melton
Party	Votes	%	Swing	Seats	Change
Independents	52,864	54.03		5	▲2
Independent Labor	25,144	25.70		4	▲1
Independent Liberal	15,046	15.38		1	▼2
Ind. Democratic Labour	2,515	2.57		0	Steady
Greens	2,279	2.33		0	Steady
Formal votes	97,848	96.25			
Informal votes	3,809	3.75			
Total	101,657	100.00		10	▲1
Registered voters / turnout	125,619	80.92			

=== Bullum Bullum ===
2024 Victorian local elections: Bullum Bullum Ward
Party	Candidate	Votes	%	±%
Independent Labor	Steve Abboushi	5,666	53.55	
Independent	Keegan Hand-Howden	3,616	34.18	
Independent	Steve Galevski	1,298	12.27	
Total formal votes		10,580	97.07	
Informal votes		319	2.93	
Turnout		10,899	84.35	
After distribution of preferences
Independent Labor win		(new ward)		

=== Cambrian ===
2024 Victorian local elections: Cambrian Ward
Party	Candidate	Votes	%	±%
Independent	Bob Turner	4,922	50.71	
Independent	Ken Hardy	2,887	29.74	
Greens	Aamer Kiani	929	9.57	
Independent	Kubir Khanal	522	5.38	
Independent Liberal	George Palackalody	447	4.60	
Total formal votes		9,707	96.51	
Informal votes		351	3.49	
Turnout		10,058	78.85	
After distribution of preferences
Independent win		(new ward)		

=== Coolibah ===
2024 Victorian local elections: Coolibah Ward
Party	Candidate	Votes	%	±%
Independent	Roderick Borg	1,900	23.06	
Independent	Brandi Morris	1,678	20.37	
Greens	Veronika Levchenkova	1,350	16.39	
Independent	Md Omor Faruq	1,014	12.31	
Independent	Jasmeen Kaur Grewal	768	9.32	
Independent	Nasim Uddin	561	6.81	
Independent	Andrew Majdlik	366	4.44	
Independent	Victor Ikeh	249	3.02	
Independent	Gurjant Singh	228	2.77	
Independent	Affan Hashmi	124	1.51	
Total formal votes		8,238	94.14	
Informal votes		513	5.86	
Turnout		8,751	77.63	
Two-candidate-preferred result
Independent	Brandi Morris	4,466	54.21	
Independent	Roderick Borg	3,772	45.79	
Independent win		(new ward)		

=== Hilltop ===
2024 Victorian local elections: Hilltop Ward
Party	Candidate	Votes	%	±%
Independent Liberal	Andrew Deeming	3,422	35.55	
Independent	John Verdon	3,017	31.34	
Independent Labor	Ujjala Camilleri	2,011	20.89	
Independent	Julian Cugliari	1,176	12.22	
Total formal votes		9,626	96.98	
Informal votes		300	3.02	
Turnout		9,926	84.52	
Two-candidate-preferred result
Independent	John Verdon	5,106	53.04	
Independent Liberal	Andrew Deeming	4,520	46.96	
Independent win		(new ward)		

=== Jackwood ===
2024 Victorian local elections: Jackwood Ward
Party	Candidate	Votes	%	±%
Independent Labor	Ashleigh Vandenberg	4,399	38.66	
Independent Liberal	Goran Kesic	2,757	24.23	
Independent	Melanie Jones	1,507	13.24	
Independent	Mandip Singh	802	7.05	
Independent	Jasmeet Singh Pannu	688	6.05	
Independent	Lokesh Makkar	477	4.19	
Independent	Satinder Singh	419	3.68	
Independent	Wally Harpreet Singh Walia	331	2.91	
Total formal votes		11,380	96.95	
Informal votes		358	3.05	
Turnout		11,738	82.88	
Two-candidate-preferred result
Independent Labor	Ashleigh Vandenberg	6,918	60.79	
Independent Liberal	Goran Kesic	4,462	39.21	
Independent Labor win		(new ward)		

=== Lake Caroline ===
2024 Victorian local elections: Lake Caroline Ward
Party	Candidate	Votes	%	±%
Independent	Kathy Majdlik	4,110	37.08	
Independent	Sarah O'Neill	2,018	18.21	
Independent	Iris Du	2,009	18.13	
Independent Liberal	Mimmie Claudine Watts	1,195	10.78	
Independent	Jake Krohn	1,013	9.14	
Independent Labor	Ajay Pasupulate	738	6.66	
Total formal votes		11,083	96.91	
Informal votes		353	3.09	
Turnout		11,436	83.26	
Two-candidate-preferred result
Independent	Kathy Majdlik	6,358	57.37	
Independent	Iris Du	4,725	42.63	
Independent win		(new ward)		

=== Mount Atkinson ===
2024 Victorian local elections: Mount Atkinson Ward
Party	Candidate	Votes	%	±%
Independent Labor	Phillip Zada	3,458	40.12	
Independent	Matt Pearse	2,290	26.57	
Independent	Harpreet Singh Marwaha	947	10.99	
Independent Labor	Ranjit Singh	946	10.97	
Independent	Golam Haque	573	6.65	
Independent	Rohit Reddy Rampur	406	4.71	
Total formal votes		8,620	96.30	
Informal votes		331	3.70	
Turnout		8,951	78.26	
Two-candidate-preferred result
Independent Labor	Phillip Zada	5,353	62.10	
Independent	Matt Pearse	3,267	37.90	
Independent Labor win		(new ward)		

=== Stringybark ===
2024 Victorian local elections: Stringybark Ward
Party	Candidate	Votes	%	±%
Independent Liberal	Julie Shannon	3,970	43.98	
Independent Labor	Stephen Waddell	1,553	17.20	
Independent Liberal	Chander Sharma	1,265	14.01	
Independent	Nib De Santis	1,187	13.15	
Independent	Ravinder Kaur	712	7.89	
Independent	Sushma Nagaraj	340	3.77	
Total formal votes		9,027	95.53	
Informal votes		422	4.47	
Turnout		9,449	78.10	
After distribution of preferences
Independent Liberal	Julie Shannon	4,825	53.45	
Independent Labor	Stephen Waddell	2,107	23.34	
Independent Liberal	Chander Sharma	2,095	23.21	
Independent Liberal win		(new ward)		

=== Sugar Gum ===
2024 Victorian local elections: Sugar Gum Ward
Party	Candidate	Votes	%	±%
Independent Labor	Lara Carli	6,373	57.20	
Ind. Democratic Labour	Daniel Toncic	2,515	22.57	
Independent	Bill Au	2,254	20.23	
Total formal votes		11,142	96.60	
Informal votes		392	3.40	
Turnout		11,534	84.50	
Independent Labor win		(new ward)		

=== Watts ===
2024 Victorian local elections: Watts Ward
Party	Candidate	Votes	%	±%
Independent	Sophie Ramsey	2,524	29.89	
Independent Liberal	Graham Watt	1,990	23.56	
Independent	Ashleigh Warren	1,684	19.94	
Independent	Ted Caruana	632	7.48	
Independent	George D. Rozario	458	5.42	
Independent	Michael Tat	452	5.35	
Independent	Merrick Price	304	3.60	
Independent	Kulwant Singh Bhambra	244	2.89	
Independent	Vincent Fasulo	157	1.86	
Total formal votes		8,445	94.73	
Informal votes		470	5.27	
Turnout		8,915	75.28	
Two-candidate-preferred result
Independent	Sophie Ramsey	4,987	59.05	
Independent Liberal	Graham Watt	3,458	40.95	
Independent win		(new ward)		

== Moonee Valley ==
2024 Moonee Valley City Council election
- 26 October 2024

All 9 seats on Moonee Valley City Council 5 seats needed for a majority
- Registered: 89,755
- Turnout: 83.12%
	First party	Second party	Third party
	IND		IND
Party	Independent	Labor	Ind. Liberal
Last election	7 seats	2 seats	0 seats
Seats before	6	3	0
Seats won	3	4	2
Seat change	▼3	▲1	▲2
First preference vote	36,708	19,389	8,316
Percentage	50.68%	26.76%	11.48%
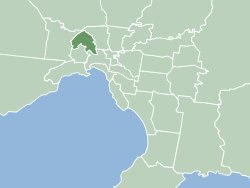
Largest party before election
Independents
Subsequent largest party
No overall control

Moonee Valley City Council is composed of nine single-member wards. Prior to the 2024 election, it was composed of three multi-member wards electing three members each, but the electoral structure has changed as a result of the Local Government Act 2020.

In March 2024, Buckley Ward councillor Cam Nation resigned from council. He was replaced by Jessica O'Neil via countback on 29 April 2024.

The Labor Party endorsed a total of seven candidates. This included Myrnong Ward councillor Rose Iser, who was elected as an independent in 2020 but joined Labor ahead of the 2024 election.

=== Moonee Valley results ===
2024 Victorian local elections: Moonee Valley
Party	Votes	%	Swing	Seats	Change
Independents	36,708	50.68		3	▼3
Labor	19,389	26.76		4	▲2
Independent Liberal	8,316	11.48		2	▲2
Greens	4,725	6.52		0	Steady
Libertarian	1,853	2.55		0	Steady
Victorian Socialists	1,447	1.99		0	Steady
Formal votes	72,438	97.09			
Informal votes	2,169	2.91			
Total	74,607	100.0		9	
Registered voters / turnout	89,755	83.12			

=== Airport ===
2024 Victorian local elections: Airport Ward
Party	Candidate	Votes	%	±%
Independent Liberal	Hamish Jones	2,296	28.44	
Labor	Jan Chantry	2,278	28.22	
Independent	Mark Harris	1,475	18.27	
Independent	Simon Shamoon	1,377	17.06	
Independent	David Wright	646	8.00	
Total formal votes		8,072	97.61	
Informal votes		198	2.39	
Turnout		8,270	84.76	
Two-candidate-preferred result
Independent Liberal	Hamish Jones	4,319	53.51	+53.51
Labor	Jan Chantry	3,753	46.49	+46.49
Independent Liberal win		(new ward)		

=== Buckley ===
2024 Victorian local elections: Buckley Ward
Party	Candidate	Votes	%	±%
Independent Liberal	John Barnes	2,233	26.60	
Independent	Narelle Sharpe	2,002	23.84	
Independent Liberal	Christian Martinu	1,414	16.84	
Victorian Socialists	Madeline Curkovic	969	11.54	
Independent	Sean O'Neill	935	11.14	
Independent	Megan Stapleton	843	10.04	
Total formal votes		8,396	97.37	
Informal votes		227	2.63	
Turnout		8,623	85.49	
Two-candidate-preferred result
Independent Liberal	John Barnes	4,790	57.05	+57.05
Independent	Narelle Sharpe	3,606	42.95	+42.95
Independent Liberal win		(new ward)		

=== Canning ===
2024 Victorian local elections: Canning Ward
Party	Candidate	Votes	%	±%
Labor	Paula Theocharides	3,672	40.76	
Independent	Jacob Hvezda	3,270	36.30	
Independent	Armando Pianese	2,067	22.94	
Total formal votes		9,009	96.95	
Informal votes		283	3.05	
Turnout		9,292	85.40	
Two-candidate-preferred result
Labor	Paula Theocharides	4,509	50.05	
Independent	Jacob Hvezda	4,500	49.95	
Labor win		(new ward)		

=== Fairbairn ===
2024 Victorian local elections: Fairbairn Ward
Party	Candidate	Votes	%	±%
Labor	Phil Burn	4,140	62.32	
Greens	Dylan McGinness	2,503	37.68	
Total formal votes		6,643	94.55	
Informal votes		383	5.45	
Turnout		7,026	78.72	
Labor win		(new ward)		

=== Milleara ===
2024 Victorian local elections: Milleara Ward
Party	Candidate	Votes	%	±%
Independent	John Sipek	4,213	48.12	
Independent	Jessica O'Neil	3,480	39.74	
Labor	Joe Cerritelli	1,063	12.14	
Total formal votes		8,756	97.88	
Informal votes		190	2.12	
Turnout		8,946	86.45	
Two-candidate-preferred result
Independent	John Sipek	4,688	53.54	+53.54
Independent	Jessica O'Neil	4,068	46.46	+46.46
Independent win		(new ward)		

=== Myrnong ===
2024 Victorian local elections: Myrnong Ward
Party	Candidate	Votes	%	±%
Labor	Rose Iser	3,452	45.92	
Greens	Jodie Kinnersley	1,406	18.70	
Libertarian	Cameron Smith	1,194	15.88	
Independent	Juno Robertson	987	13.13	
Victorian Socialists	James Gallagher	478	6.36	
Total formal votes		7,517	97.69	
Informal votes		178	2.31	
Turnout		7,695	78.29	
After distribution of preferences
Labor	Rose Iser	3,853	51.26	+51.26
Greens	Jodie Kinnersley	2,124	28.26	+28.26
Libertarian	Cameron Smith	1,540	20.49	+20.49
Labor win		(new ward)		

=== Queens Park ===
2024 Victorian local elections: Queens Park Ward
Party	Candidate	Votes	%	±%
Independent	Ava Adams	3,541	45.90	
Independent	Jacob Bettio	957	12.40	
Greens	Owen Parris	816	10.58	
Independent	David Bartl	787	10.20	
Independent	David Garotti	737	9.55	
Independent	Peter Vasilogiannacopoulos	555	7.19	
Independent	Spencer Kassimir	322	4.17	
Total formal votes		7,715	96.44	
Informal votes		285	3.56	
Turnout		8,000	81.08	
After distribution of preferences
Independent	Ava Adams	4,294	55.66	
Independent	Jacob Bettio	1,238	16.05	
Independent	David Bartl	1,101	14.27	
Independent	David Garotti	1,082	14.02	
Independent win		(new ward)		

=== Steele Creek ===
2024 Victorian local elections: Steele Creek Ward
Party	Candidate	Votes	%	±%
Independent	Samantha Byrne	2,891	33.28	
Labor	Pierce Tyson	2,483	28.58	
Independent	Tania Piccolo	1,839	21.17	
Independent Liberal	Stefano Emodi	816	9.39	
Libertarian	David Liistro	659	7.59	
Total formal votes		8,688	97.97	
Informal votes		180	2.03	
Turnout		8,868	83.91	
Two-candidate-preferred result
Independent	Samantha Byrne	5,333	61.38	
Labor	Pierce Tyson	3,355	38.62	
Independent win		(new ward)		

=== Woodlands ===
2024 Victorian local elections: Woodlands Ward
Party	Candidate	Votes	%	±%
Labor	Fran Cosgriff	2,301	30.11	
Independent	Jason Stuart Bryant	1,457	19.07	
Independent	Lachlan Taylor	1,213	15.87	
Independent Liberal	Tommy Le Deux	930	12.17	
Independent	Abby McCurdy	735	9.62	
Independent Liberal	Mark A. Errichiello	627	8.20	
Independent	Nino Piscitelli	379	4.96	
Total formal votes		7,642	96.89	
Informal votes		245	3.11	
Turnout		7,887	83.06	
Two-candidate-preferred result
Labor	Fran Cosgriff	4,339	56.78	
Independent	Jason Stuart Bryant	3,303	43.22	
Labor win		(new ward)		

== Wyndham ==
2024 Wyndham City Council election
- October 2024

All 11 seats on Wyndham City Council 6 seats needed for a majority
Largest party before election
Independents
Subsequent largest party
Independents

Wyndham City Council is composed of eleven single-member wards. Prior to the 2024 election, it was composed of three multi-member wards (two four-member wards and one three-member ward), but the electoral structure has changed as a result of the Local Government Act 2020.

=== Wyndham results ===
2024 Victorian local elections: Wyndham
Party	Votes	%	Swing	Seats	Change
Independents	81,183	62.42		6	▼1
Independent Labor	23,918	18.10		3	Steady
Independent Liberal	16,202	12.26		2	▲1
Greens	7,667	5.80		0	Steady
Victorian Socialists	1,875	1.42		0	Steady
Libertarian	1,313	1.00		0	Steady
Formal votes	132,158	96.15			
Informal votes	5,291	3.85			
Total	137,449	100.00		11	Steady
Registered voters / turnout	169,311	81.18			

=== Bemin ===
2024 Victorian local elections: Bemin Ward
Party	Candidate	Votes	%	±%
Independent Liberal	Preet Singh	2,412	23.20	
Independent	Nick Ladbrooke	1,417	13.63	
Independent	Jazeer Nijamudeen	1,380	13.28	
Independent Labor	Nusrat Islam	887	8.53	
Independent	Ramesh Suthar	724	6.96	
Independent	Ian Ruxton	552	5.31	
Independent	Cesar De Castro	551	5.30	
Independent	Linda Cron	412	3.96	
Independent	Gursharan Singh	372	3.58	
Independent	Sadra Saeed	321	3.09	
Independent	Rav Sri Panditharathne	320	3.08	
Independent	Janette Diep	314	3.02	
Independent Labor	Syeda Bahadur	310	2.98	
Independent	Geet Gaba	273	2.63	
Independent	Rufo Paredes	150	1.44	
Total formal votes		10,395	93.75	
Informal votes		693	6.25	
Turnout		11,088	81.59	
Two-candidate-preferred result
Independent Liberal	Preet Singh	5,851	56.29	
Independent	Nick Ladbrooke	4,544	43.71	
Independent Liberal win		(new ward)		

=== Brinbeal ===
2024 Victorian local elections: Brinbeal Ward
Party	Candidate	Votes	%	±%
Independent Labor	Robert Szatkowski	3,218	26.04	
Independent	Rifai A. Raheem	2,745	22.21	
Independent	Rishi Prabhakar	1,922	15.55	
Independent Labor	Kishaun Thiruchelvam	1,800	14.56	
Independent	Virpal Kaur	923	7.47	
Independent	Peter Hili	911	7.37	
Victorian Socialists	Ian Devapura	435	3.52	
Independent	Aijaz Moinuddin	406	3.28	
Total formal votes		12,360	95.93	
Informal votes		524	4.07	
Turnout		12,884	82.32	
Two-candidate-preferred result
Independent Labor	Robert Szatkowski	7,043	56.98	
Independent	Rifai A. Raheem	5,317	43.02	
Independent Labor win		(new ward)		

=== Cheetham ===
2024 Victorian local elections: Cheetham Ward
Party	Candidate	Votes	%	±%
Independent	Susan McIntyre	4,905	43.93	
Independent Liberal	Angela Newhouse	3,776	33.82	
Greens	Emi Neville	996	8.92	
Independent Liberal	Shyam Vishwanathan	746	6.68	
Independent	Kamran Javed	508	4.55	
Independent	Satnam Singh	235	2.10	
Total formal votes		11,166	97.63	
Informal votes		271	2.37	
Turnout		11,437	80.92	
Two-candidate-preferred result
Independent	Susan McIntyre	6,063	54.30	
Independent Liberal	Angela Newhouse	5,103	45.70	
Independent win		(new ward)		

=== Featherbrook ===
2024 Victorian local elections: Featherbrook Ward
Party	Candidate	Votes	%	±%
Independent	Jasmine Hill	4,279	35.26	
Independent	Tony Hooper	2,535	20.89	
Independent Liberal	Raja Reddy	1,723	14.20	
Independent Labor	Tully Smith	1,261	10.39	
Independent	Kelvin Small	578	4.76	
Independent Labor	Hasan Naim	568	4.68	
Independent	Vladimir Molotsky	515	4.24	
Greens	Aneez Rehman	417	3.44	
Independent	Arthur Fernandes	259	2.13	
Total formal votes		12,135	96.33	
Informal votes		462	3.67	
Turnout		12,597	81.57	
Two-candidate-preferred result
Independent	Jasmine Hill	7,435	61.27	
Independent	Tony Hooper	4,700	38.73	
Independent win		(new ward)		

=== Grange ===
2024 Victorian local elections: Grange Ward
Party	Candidate	Votes	%	±%
Independent	Shannon McGuire	4,406	35.41	
Victorian Socialists	Beth Jackson	1,440	11.57	
Independent	Marcel John Mahfoud	1,419	11.40	
Libertarian	Patrizia Barcatta	1,313	10.55	
Independent	Melba Waugh	1,252	10.06	
Independent	Lillian O'Connor	744	5.98	
Independent	Tushar Kumar	587	4.72	
Independent	Sophie Melhem	570	4.58	
Independent	Malik Ahmad	453	3.64	
Independent	Azhar Habib	258	2.07	
Total formal votes		12,442	95.45	
Informal votes		593	4.55	
Turnout		13,035	83.41	
After distribution of preferences
Independent	Shannon McGuire	6,628	53.27	
Victorian Socialists	Beth Jackson	3,052	24.53	
Independent	Marcel John Mahfoud	2,762	22.20	
Independent win		(new ward)		

=== Heathdale ===
2024 Victorian local elections: Heathdale Ward
Party	Candidate	Votes	%	±%
Independent	Jennie Barrera	5,925	49.42	
Independent	Andrew Elsbury	3,178	26.51	
Greens	Jack Boddeke	2,886	24.07	
Total formal votes		11,989	97.08	
Informal votes		360	2.92	
Turnout		12,349	77.82	
Two-candidate-preferred result
Independent	Jennie Barrera	7,865	65.60	
Independent	Andrew Elsbury	4,124	34.40	
Independent win		(new ward)		

==== 2026 Heathdale Ward by-election ====
2026 Heathdale Ward by-election (13–31 July 2026)
Party	Candidate	Votes	%	±%
Independent Labor	Kim McAliney	5,985	52.59	+52.59
Independent	Pippa Pace	3,153	27.70	+27.70
Independent	Marcel Mahfoud	2,243	19.71	+19.71
Total formal votes		11,381	97.01	−0.07
Informal votes		351	2.99	+0.07
Turnout		11,732	74.33	−3.49
Independent Labor gain from Independent		Swing	N/A	

- By-election held after the resignation of sitting councillor Jennie Barrera.

=== Iramoo ===
2024 Victorian local elections: Iramoo Ward
Party	Candidate	Votes	%	±%
Independent	Lisa Markovic	2,732	22.63	
Independent	Maria King	2,572	21.30	
Independent Labor	Monica Sharma Raizada	2,118	17.54	
Independent	Nurul Khan	1,641	13.59	
Independent	Jade Austin	1,291	10.69	
Independent	David Kirby	1,289	10.68	
Independent	Prashant Tandon	430	3.56	
Total formal votes		12,073	95.96	
Informal votes		508	4.04	
Turnout		12,581	80.22	
Two-candidate-preferred result
Independent	Maria King	6,697	55.47	
Independent	Lisa Markovic	5,376	44.53	
Independent win		(new ward)		

=== Quandong ===
2024 Victorian local elections: Quandong Ward
Party	Candidate	Votes	%	±%
Independent Labor	Peter John Maynard	6,813	58.12	
Independent Labor	Amanpreet Miglani	1,536	13.10	
Independent	Monica Dewhurst	1,216	10.37	
Independent	Poly Kiyaga	871	7.43	
Independent	Vikas Joshi	809	6.90	
Independent Liberal	Muneet Narang	478	4.08	
Total formal votes		11,723	96.76	
Informal votes		392	3.24	
Turnout		12,115	79.32	
After distribution of preferences
Independent Labor win		(new ward)		

=== Werribee Park ===
2024 Victorian local elections: Werribee Park Ward
Party	Candidate	Votes	%	±%
Independent Liberal	Mia Frances Shaw	5,464	43.21	
Independent	Heather Marcus	3,812	30.15	
Greens	Thomas Curkowskyj	3,368	26.64	
Total formal votes		12,644	97.78	
Informal votes		287	2.22	
Turnout		12,931	80.87	
Two-candidate-preferred result
Independent Liberal	Mia Frances Shaw	7,573	59.89	
Independent	Heather Marcus	5,071	40.11	
Independent Liberal win		(new ward)		

- Ashok Sherwal nominated to contest the election, but was found to be ineligible after not completing mandatory candidate training. He was "retired" as a candidate on 20 September 2024 and did not appear on the ballot paper.

=== Williams Landing ===
2024 Victorian local elections: Williams Landing Ward
Party	Candidate	Votes	%	±%
Independent	Larry Zhao	2,548	19.40	
Independent	Adele Albina Hegedich	2,360	17.97	
Independent	Aaron An	1,696	12.91	
Independent	Patrick Joseph Madigan	1,442	10.98	
Independent	Sayeed Aslam	970	7.39	
Independent Labor	Luke Faraci	854	6.50	
Independent	Sahana Ramesh	713	5.43	
Independent	Adrian Abdulovski	611	4.65	
Independent Liberal	Ali Hashmi	558	4.25	
Independent	Rahima Ahmed	535	4.07	
Independent	Jagdish Patra	456	3.47	
Independent	Inshu Misra	391	2.98	
Total formal votes		13,134	94.98	
Informal votes		694	5.02	
Turnout		13,828	82.21	
Two-candidate-preferred result
Independent	Larry Zhao	6,736	51.29	
Independent	Adele Albina Hegedich	6,398	48.71	
Independent win		(new ward)		

=== Wimba ===
2024 Victorian local elections: Wimba Ward
Party	Candidate	Votes	%	±%
Independent Labor	Josh Gilligan	3,054	25.25	
Independent Labor	Kim McAliney	1,499	12.39	
Independent	Paul Hopper	1,062	8.78	
Independent Liberal	Venkat Ram Upparlapalle	1,045	8.64	
Independent	Henry Barlow	977	8.08	
Independent	Shaikh Rahman	976	8.07	
Independent	Navpreet Singh Sandhu	782	6.46	
Independent	Satish Patel	678	5.60	
Independent	Ketan Patel	577	4.77	
Independent	Kieran Ives	537	4.44	
Independent	Deepak Bansal	526	4.35	
Independent	Paul Mayen Malual	384	3.17	
Total formal votes		12,097	95.98	
Informal votes		507	4.02	
Turnout		12,604	82.76	
Two-candidate-preferred result
Independent Labor	Josh Gilligan	6,891	56.96	
Independent Labor	Kim McAliney	5,206	43.04	
Independent Labor win		(new ward)		

== See also ==
- Results of the 2024 Victorian local elections in Eastern Melbourne
- Results of the 2024 Victorian local elections in Inner Melbourne
- Results of the 2024 Victorian local elections in Northern Melbourne
- Results of the 2024 Victorian local elections in South-Eastern Melbourne
