= Mambourin =

- Town
- Interactive map of Mambourin
- Coordinates: 37.912°S 144.549°E
- Country: Australia
- State: Victoria
- LGA: City of Wyndham
- Location: 38 km (24 mi) from Melbourne; 10 km (6.2 mi) from Werribee

Government
  - State electorate: Werribee
  - Federal divisions: Corio; Lalor

Population
  - Total: 315 (2021 census)
- Postcode: 3024
Localities around Mambourin
Balliang	Quandong	Wyndham Vale
Little River	Mambourin	Werribee
Little River	Cocoroc	Cocoroc

Mambourin is a newly developed suburb in Victoria, Australia, 38 km (24 mi) south-west of Melbourne's Central Business District, located within the City of Wyndham local government area. Mambourin recorded a population of 315 at the 2021 census. The population of Mambourin is experiencing rapid growth, as evidenced by the construction of several thousand new homes annually.

The proposed suburb is a result of two major house and land projects in the area - Country Garden Australia's Windermere project (4,700 lots) and Frasers Property's Mambourin project (1,200 lots). Based on an average population of 3.1 people per household in the Wyndham LGA in the 2016 census, this will make the suburb's future population in excess of 18,000 persons. This population forecast, when compared to the current population count of 315 from the 2021 census, would result in a predicted growth of roughly 5,600% over the next few years.

Mambourin will be built around a planned new railway station on the existing Regional Rail Link, allowing the suburb's residents to commute directly to the Melbourne CBD. In addition, Mambourin will also have local convenience shopping, including a supermarket, up to 50 specialty stores and an entertainment precinct, as well as two public primary schools and one public secondary school.

== Urban planning ==
The Mambourin East precinct, located within Melbourne's Western Growth Corridor, has been designated as a regionally significant industrial area. Covering approximately 561 hectares, it is bounded by the future Bayview precinct to the north, Black Forest Road South to the east, the Melbourne–Geelong railway line to the south, and the proposed Outer Metropolitan Ring Road corridor to the west. Under the Victorian Government's ten-year greenfield planning programme, preparation of its precinct structure plan is scheduled to begin between 2029–30 and 2033–34.
