= Wyndham City Libraries =

Wyndham City Libraries provide a range of public library services at five branches in the Melbourne outer metropolitan City of Wyndham local government area. Its nine branch libraries are located at the Werribee Plaza shopping centre, in the Werribee city centre, at Point Cook Town Centre, and in Wyndham Vale and Tarneit and Williams Landing and Truganina Truganina, Victoria near a neighborhood.

== Branches ==
=== Plaza Library ===
The Plaza Library (formerly called the Heaths Road Library) is the largest library in the service and acts as the main branch library. Management of Wyndham City Libraries is coordinated at the Plaza branch. Originally, the central branch of the Wyndham (then Werribee) Library Service was located at the Civic Centre on Princes Highway, Werribee. The library opened at the Werribee Plaza Shopping Centre in 1993, was renovated in stages in the mid-2000s, and was updated in late 2010 with the integration of RFID technology.

In January 2015, the Plaza Library moved to a new location in the redeveloped Werribee Plaza Shopping Centre.

=== Point Cook Library ===
The Point Cook Library opened in September 2009 as part of the Point Cook Community Learning Centre (located within the Point Cook Town Centre). The library covers approximately 950m². The Point Cook branch was the first Wyndham branch library to use RFID technology in its stock management.

In its first two months of operation, the Point Cook Library had almost 45,000 unique visitors and recorded almost 78,000 loans.

=== Werribee Library ===
The Werribee Library (previously called the CBD Library, as in Central Business District) opened in its current location, at the Wyndham Cultural Centre on Watton Street, in 2001. Previously it had operated from a smaller site on Barnes Place. The library underwent a major renovation in October 2010. A number of 'boutique'-style shelving areas were installed to promote browsing, to highlight general interest material and to improve both stock management and use.

=== Manor Lakes Library ===
The Manor Lakes Library is part of the Manor Lakes Community Learning Centre, and opened on 4 July 2011, originally named Wyndham Vale Library. Its official opening on 10 November 2011 by then-local member and Prime Minister Julia Gillard was the only official opening of a public library by Gillard during her term as prime minister.

The design of the Manor Lakes Community Learning Centre echoes that of the Point Cook Community Learning Centre, and indicates a strategy that partners public libraries with allied local government services, including kindergartens and child health services. The Manor Lakes Library hosted a visit from Victorian and interstate library professionals in 2012 as a site of "best practice" for Australian library and local government community facilities.

=== Julia Gillard Library Tarneit ===
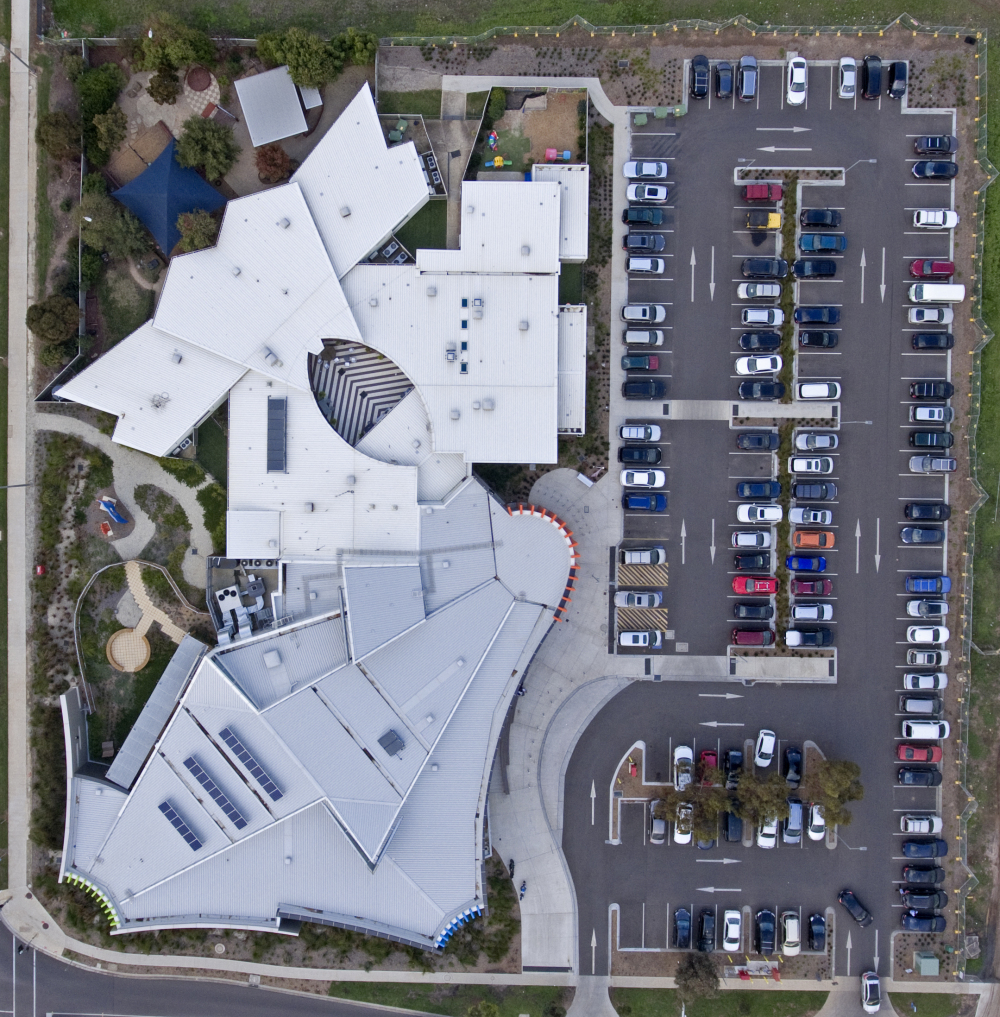
Top-down aerial perspective of Tarneit Library. Taken in 2017

A library has been built in the Tarneit Community Learning Centre. The library is named in honour of former Member of Parliament for Lalor and Prime Minister Julia Gillard. The new library was funded by a mixture of state and local government funds, and the then-mayor Cr Heather Marcus indicated in August 2013 that Wyndham City intended for the library to serve the populations of Tarneit and Williams Landing. The Tarneit Library was opened on 14 December 2015.

=== Williams Landing Library Lounge and Williams Landing box locker ===
On November 25, 2021, The Wyndham Council placed a new locker for returning books; its intended purpose is when you loan a book, you get it at a locker like package storage. A year later on February 21, 2022, there was maintenance at the box locker and only the lounge is open. The lockers located at Everton Road, the locker is at the shopping center and the lounge is on 101 Overton Road.

=== Truganina Library Lounge ===
It first opened on May 6, 2024, on the corner of Woods Road and Everton Road (1 Everton Road) as Truganina wanted a new library with its growing population.

=== Pop-up-vans and some pop-up-libraries ===
Usually they would show up at Wyndham Events or for special events, for example when the Point Cook library was closed because of the redevelopment of the plaza and currently there is one at Salt Water in Point Cook.

== See also ==
- Libraries in Melbourne
