= Parwan, Victoria =

Parwan
- Town
- Interactive map of Parwan
- Coordinates: 37°43′S 144°27′E
- Country: Australia
- State: Victoria
- LGAs: Shire of Moorabool; City of Melton
- Location: 45 km (28 mi) NW of Melbourne; 56 km (35 mi) SW of Ballarat

Government
  - State electorate: Melton
  - Federal division: Hawke

Population
  - Total: 188 (2021 census)
- Postcode: 3340
Localities around Parwan
Maddingley	Bacchus Marsh	Hopetoun Park; Brookfield
Rowsley	Parwan	Eynesbury; Exford
Balliang	Balliang East	Eynesbury

Parwan is a locality in Victoria, Australia, 45 km (28 mi) west of Melbourne's Central Business District, located within the City of Melton and the Shire of Moorabool local government areas. Parwan recorded a population of 188 at the 2021 census.

Predominantly Parwan lies within the local government area (LGA) of the Shire of Moorabool, but some of Parwan lies within the LGA of the City of Melton.

== History ==
Parwan railway station opened on the Ararat railway line in 1886 and closed in the 1980s.

Parwan Railway Station Post Office opened on 1 September 1886, was renamed Parwan in 1914 and closed in 1962.

== Parwan Valley ==
The Parwan Valley lies between the Brisbane Ranges, Werribee Gorge State Park and the You Yangs. Its nearest town is Bacchus Marsh. The Valley was used as farming land from the mid-1850s onwards, but after several decades of agricultural abuse the soils became extremely saline causing erosion all around the valley. By 1948 it was estimated that erosion in the valley had reduced the holding capacity of the nearby Melton Reservoir by 20%. The Victorian Government compulsorily acquired the land and has been attempting to rescue the valley ever since.

At the center of the valley is White Elephant Ridge, which demonstrates the effects of soil erosion. The valley was originally a seabed. 250 million years ago after the sea receded volcanic activity caused the valley to fault and drop down leaving two large escarpments on either side. Two creeks run through the valley; Parwan Creek to the west and Spring Creek to the east.

== See also ==
- Shire of Bacchus Marsh – Parwan was previously within this former local government area.
