= Weir Views =

- Suburb
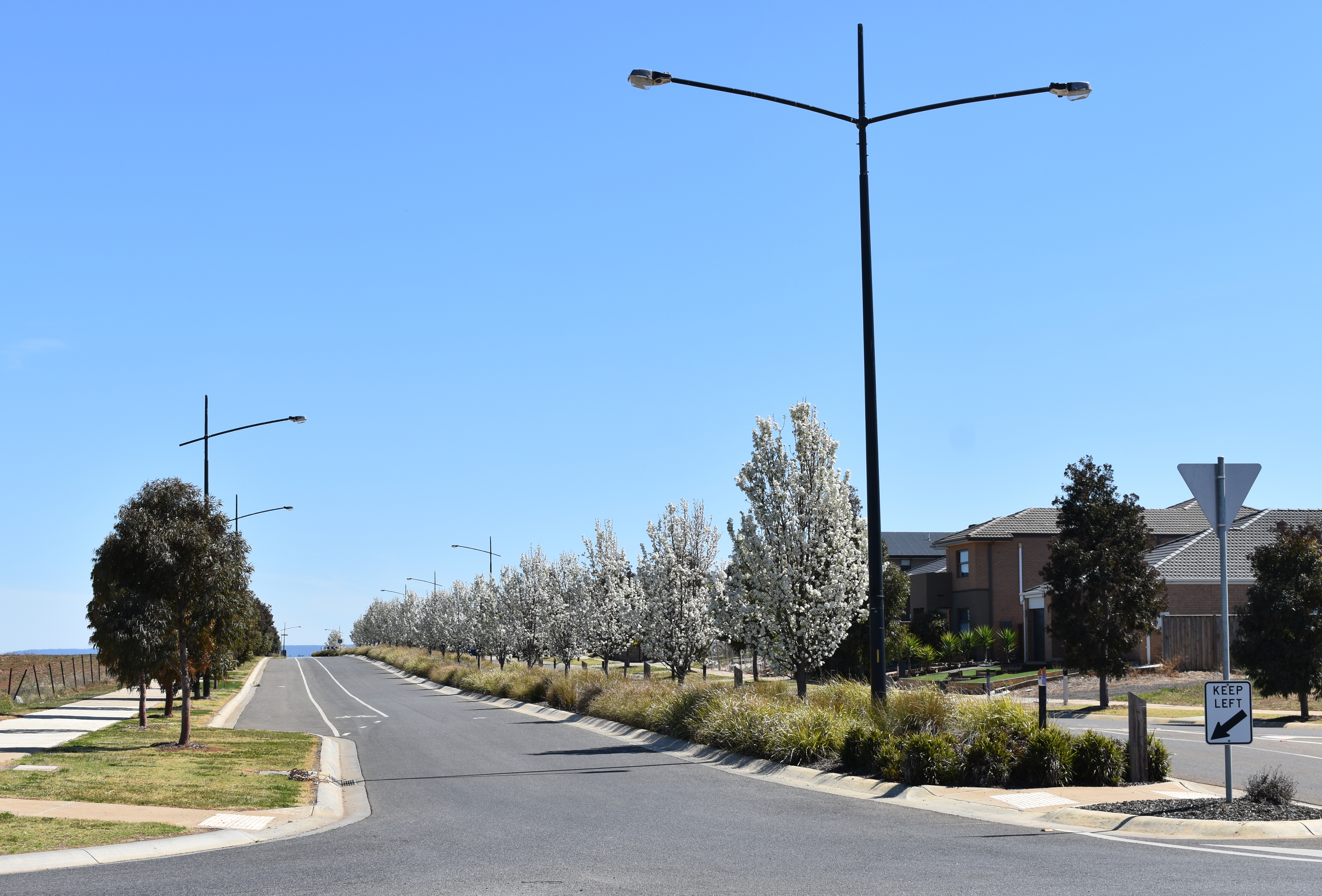
- Waterway Boulevard, Weir Views

- Interactive map of Weir Views
- Coordinates: 37°43′45″S 144°34′15″E
- Country: Australia
- State: Victoria
- City: Melbourne
- LGA: City of Melton
- Location: 35 km (22 mi) W of Melbourne; 4 km (2.5 mi) S of Melton
- Established: 2017

Government
  - State electorate: Melton
  - Federal division: Hawke

Population
  - Total: 4,390 (2023)
- Postcode: 3338
Suburbs around Weir Views
Brookfield	Melton South	Strathtulloh
Exford	Weir Views	Strathtulloh
Exford	Eynesbury	Mount Cottrell

Weir Views is a suburb located in the City of Melton, 35 km (22 mi) west of Melbourne's Central Business District. Weir Views recorded a population of 4,348 at the 2021 census. But in 2023 there might be up to 4,375 to 4,390 people.

The suburb was gazetted by the Office of Geographic Names on 9 February 2017, following a proposal for eleven new suburbs by the City of Melton. Before the suburb's creation, the area was part of Melton South. The traditional owners of the land are the Wurundjeri people.

Weir Views consists of four housing estates: Seventh Bend, Exford Waters, Opalia, and Toolern Waters. The estate of Exfort Waters contains the St Lawrence of Brindisi Catholic Primary School, which is a branch of St Anthony's of Padua Catholic Primary School.

The estate of Opalia has a small shopping centre named Opalia Plaza, containing a Woolworths supermarket, a Chemist Warehouse pharmacy, a McDonald's restaurant, and several speciality stores and cafes.
