= Cocoroc =

- Town
- Interactive map of Cocoroc
- Coordinates: 37.967°S 144.622°E
- Country: Australia
- State: Victoria
- LGA: City of Wyndham
- Location: 37 km (23 mi) from Melbourne

Government
  - State electorate: Werribee
  - Federal division: Corio

Population
  - Total: 0 (2021 census)
- Postcode: 3030
Localities around Cocoroc
Mambourin	Werribee	Werribee
Little River	Cocoroc	Werribee South
Point Wilson	Port Phillip	Port Phillip

Cocoroc is a locality in Victoria (Australia), 37 km (23 mi) south-west of Melbourne's Central Business District, located within the City of Wyndham local government area. Cocoroc recorded no population at the 2021 census.

== History ==
In 1892 the Melbourne and Metropolitan Board of Works established the Metropolitan Sewage Farm on the western bank of the Werribee River, to treat the effluent from Melbourne's new sewerage system. This area was isolated and too far from Melbourne, so a village was built to house the workers, which became the town of Cocoroc.

In 1910 Cocoroc had a population of 300. It developed further in the 1920s, with the area including a public hall and three primary schools, the first one having been opened in 1894.

As of 2018, the town has almost disappeared, with the name Cocoroc encompassing the area of what is now called the Western Treatment Plant, which covers around 10,500 hectares and treats about 60% of Melbourne's sewage.

In 2015, there was a temporary public art installation held at various locations across the Western Treatment Plant, this included installations held at some of the remaining structures from the former town of Cocoroc such as the old football oval and swimming pools. The installation was called Treatment featuring on-location works by six artists (Catherine Bell, Bindi Cole, Shane McGrath, Techa Noble, Megan Evans and Spiros Panigarakis), with free bus tours linking the artworks on a 90-minute journey through varied experiences including live performances, exhibitions, sensory and multimedia experiences.
