= Werribee South =

- Town
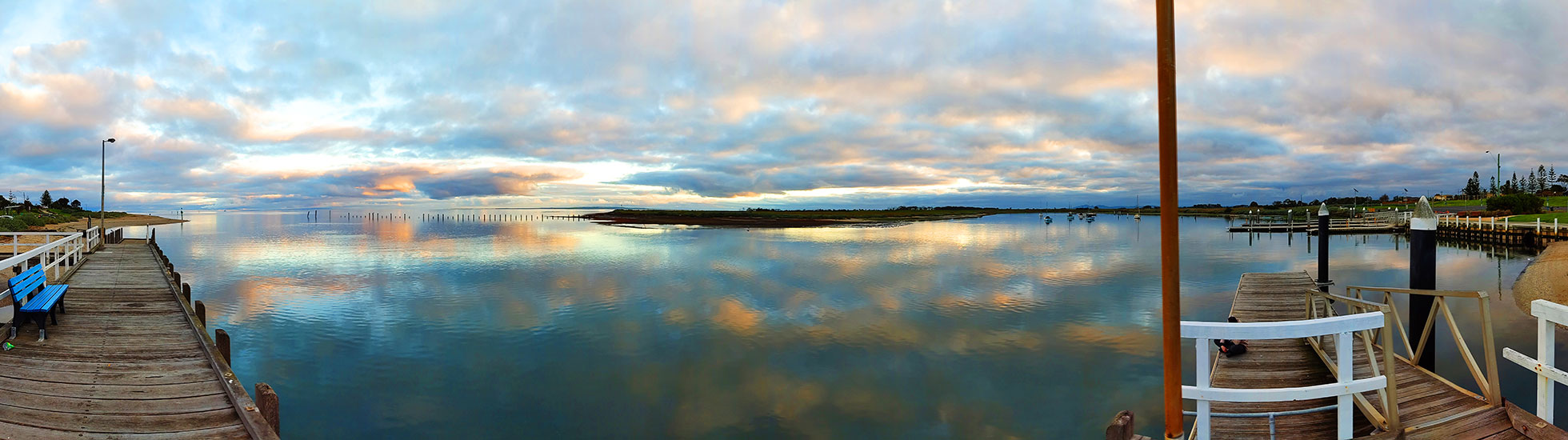
- Werribee South pier and boat ramp panorama

- Interactive map of Werribee South
- Coordinates: 37.937°S 144.697°E
- Country: Australia
- State: Victoria
- LGA: City of Wyndham
- Location: 32 km (20 mi) from Melbourne; 11 km (6.8 mi) from Werribee

Government
  - State electorate: Point Cook
  - Federal division: Lalor

Area
  - Total: 36.48 km^{2} (14.09 sq mi)
- Elevation: 13 m (43 ft)

Population
  - Total: 2,392 (2021 census)
  - Density: 65.570/km^{2} (169.83/sq mi)
- Postcode: 3030
Localities around Werribee South
Werribee	Hoppers Crossing	Point Cook
Cocoroc	Werribee South	Port Phillip
Cocoroc	Port Phillip	Port Phillip

Werribee South is a locality in Victoria, Australia, 32 km (20 mi) southwest of Melbourne's Central Business District, located within the City of Wyndham local government area. Werribee South recorded a population of 2,392 at the 2021 census.

Werribee South is a rural-urban suburb located just outside of the Melbourne metropolitan area.

== History ==
The Post Office opened on 15 May 1916 as Duncans Road, was renamed Werribee South in 1926 and closed in 1973.

=== Present-day ===
Werribee South covers an area of 3,000 hectares. The locality is almost conterminous with the Werribee Irrigation District, home to around 150 vegetable farms producing lettuce, broccoli, cauliflower, fennel, and artichoke. Around 70% of Australia's lettuces are sourced from Werribee South. The district receives its irrigation supply from the Werribee River, as well as recycled water, which was first provided in 2007.

Werribee South borders Point Cook and contains Werribee Park. Werribee South's streets originally were named by letters. This was changed by the Wyndham City Council, and the only remaining lettered street is K Road. Along K Road, the Werribee Park Mansion, Werribee Open Range Zoo and the National Equestrian Centre can be found.

A sports oval (primarily used for Australian rules football), playgrounds, community services, and food facilities can be found along the beach of Werribee South, at the main population hub of the area. The area is popular with recreational fishers, and developments include a boat launch and a marina.

Werribee South is also home to the Diggers Road Memorial Hall, which is the rehearsal venue for the Werribee Concert Band. The Diggers Road Memorial Hall was built to commemorate Australia's participation in the First World War and is located at the corner of Diggers Road and Whites Road.
