= Places Victoria =

Australian urban renewal agency

- Places Victoria Logo
- Company type: Government Authority
- Industry: Property development
- Headquarters: Melbourne, Australia
- Area served: Victoria, Australia
- Key people: Gregory Anderson - Chief Executive Officer Tony DeDomenico - Chairman
- Number of employees: ca.100
- Website: www.places.vic.gov.au

Places Victoria, was the Victorian Government's property development agency delivering urban renewal. Based in Melbourne, Australia, Places Victoria developed surplus government land. In April 2017, Places Victoria combined with Major Projects Victoria to form Development Victoria.

Places Victoria attracted private sector investment to revitalise neighbourhoods and was responsible for delivering projects in Melbourne and regional Victoria, including:

- Melbourne Docklands
- Revitalising Central Dandenong
- Junction Place, Wodonga

Places Victoria has a long history of urban revitalisation and land development in Melbourne and regional Victoria.

== Governance ==
Places Victoria was governed by a Board of Directors, chaired by Tony DeDomencio. Places Victoria's CEO was Gregory Anderson.

== History ==
Places Victoria was born from two government land organisations - the Urban and Regional Land Corporation, which played a key role in the development of Melbourne's growth corridors, and the Docklands Authority, which was set up in the early 1990s to oversee the development of Melbourne's Docklands. In August 2003, the Docklands Authority and the Urban and Regional Land Corporation merged to become VicUrban. In late 2011, Places Victoria evolved from VicUrban with a mandate to deliver urban renewal.
