= City of Melton =

Coordinates: 37°40′58″S 144°34′27″E

- Local government area
- Interactive map of City of Melton
- Location of Melton within the metropolitan council map
- Country: Australia
- State: Victoria
- Region: Greater Melbourne
- Established: 16 September 1862
- Council seat: Melton

Government
  - Mayor: Cr Steve Abboushi
  - State electorates: Kororoit; Melton; Sunbury; Sydenham
  - Federal divisions: Gorton; Hawke

Area
  - Total: 528 km^{2} (204 sq mi)

Population
  - Total: 178,960 (2021 census)
  - Density: 338.9/km^{2} (877.8/sq mi)
- County: Bourke
- Website: City of Melton
LGAs around City of Melton
Macedon Ranges	Macedon Ranges	Hume
Moorabool	City of Melton	Brimbank
Moorabool	Wyndham	Wyndham

The City of Melton is a local government area in Victoria, Australia, on Melbourne's western rural–urban fringe.

It covers 528 square kilometres (203.9 sq mi), and as of the 2021 census, Melton had a population of 178,960.

It is governed by the Melton City Council. The seat of local government and administrative offices are located at Council headquarters in Melton, the settlement after which the city takes its name which lies at the western end of the LGA and is currently its largest urban area with a population of over 54,000.

City of Melton has a rapid population growth rate, ranked 3rd fastest among LGAs in Victoria in 2010. It was granted city status in 2012.

== History ==
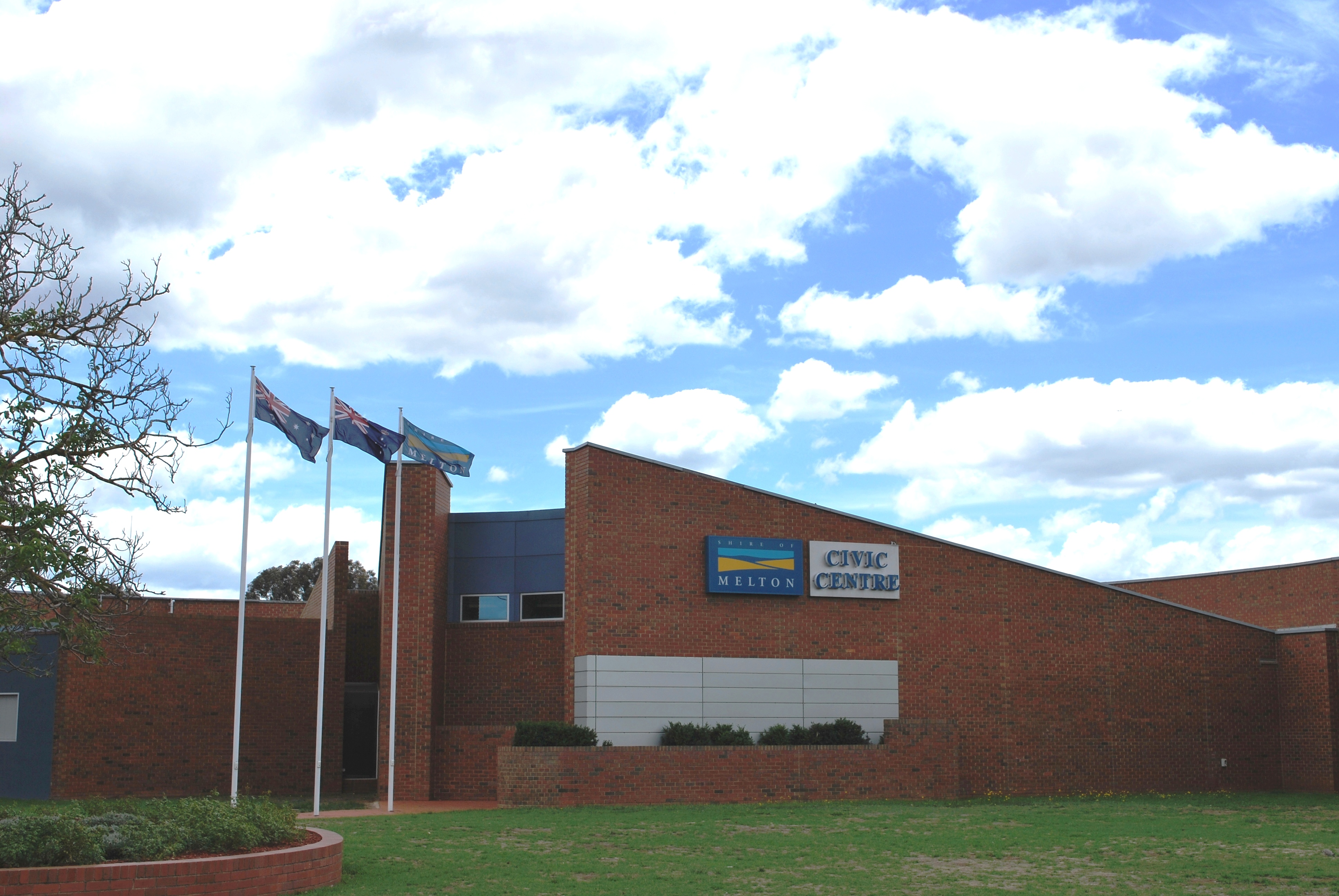
Civic centre

Melton was first incorporated as a district on 16 September 1862, and became a shire on 24 May 1871. Parts of the north and south ridings of the Shire of Braybrook (later City of Sunshine) were annexed to Melton as the Rockbank Riding on 24 May 1916, and this was added to in 1951. Other minor boundary adjustments with Bulla and Keilor occurred in May 1959. The Shire had a total area of 450.4 square kilometres (173.9 sq mi).

In 1994, following large-scale statewide local government reform, Melton acquired the Exford district from the City of Werribee, growing to its present size.

Since the early 1970s the Shire had undergone tremendous population growth and as of 2006, Melton was one of Victoria's fastest-growing local government areas along with neighbouring Wyndham.

After several years of community consultation to defer applying for city status until it had reached 150,000, the council nevertheless reversed the decision and city status was granted in September 2012. The first elected Mayor under the 'City" status was Kathy Majdlik.

In the 2020 Local Government elections, Melton had its first Aboriginal Councillor elected, Cr Ashleigh Vandenberg (a Wiradjuri woman, the first Aboriginal Councillor in Melbourne's western suburbs).

The 1994 boundary between Melton and the City of Wyndham cut through the land set aside for urban development at Eynesbury. On 1 July 2026, the City of Melton's southern boundary was shifted outwards so as to unite this land in a single LGA.

== Art and culture ==
Bush ballad "Click Go the Shears" was first published in 1891 in a local newspaper by "C.C. of Eynesbury". Eynesbury was a homestead and grazing property owned by Samuel Staughton.

CS Gallery is a contemporary exhibition space located at Caroline Springs Library and Learning Hub. It provides opportunities for artists and groups to exhibit and does not charge fees or commission. Melton Library and Learning Hub provides a number of hanging walls for the presentation of visual art and community exhibitions.

== Administration ==
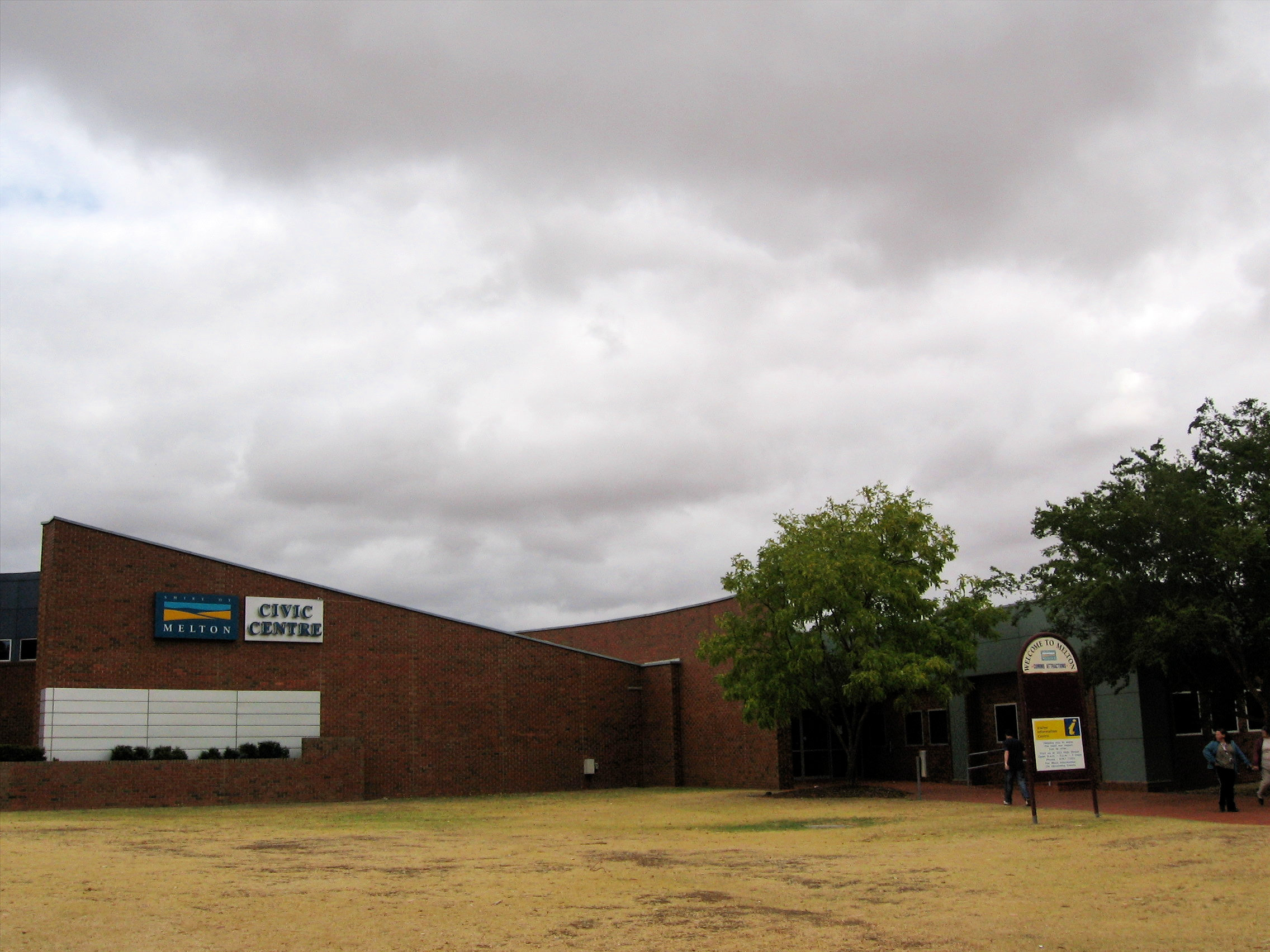
Melton City Council offices

=== Council ===
2024 ward boundaries. Expand the map and click on a ward to see the ward name.

The city's area is divided into ten wards, each electing a single member. The Councillors elect a mayor from among the council's members.

Following the 2024 local election, the current councillors are:

Ward	Party	Councillor	Notes
Bullum Bullum	Independent Labor	Steve Abboushi	Mayor
Cambrian	Independent	Bob Turner	
Coolibah	Independent	Brandi Morris	
Hilltop	Independent Labor	John Verdon	
Jackwood	Independent Labor	Ashleigh Vandenberg	
Lake Caroline	Independent	Kathy Majdlik	
Mount Atkinson	Independent Labor	Phillip Zada	
Stringybark	Independent Liberal	Julie Shannon	
Sugar Gum	Independent Labor	Lara Carli	Deputy Mayor
Watts	Independent	Sophie Ramsey	

== Townships and localities ==
The city had a population of 178,960 at the 2021 census, up from 135,443 recorded at the 2016 census.

Population
Locality	2016	2021
Aintree	*	7,982
Bonnie Brook	*	333
Brookfield	9,216	10,782
Burnside	4,751	5,800
Burnside Heights	6,072	6,377
Caroline Springs	24,205	24,488
Cobblebank	*	3,601
Deanside	*	654
Diggers Rest^	2,763	5,669
Exford	107	133
Eynesbury^	2,577	2,838
Fieldstone	*	#
Fraser Rise	*	9,097
Grangefields	*	132
Harkness	*	12,463
Hillside^	193	290
Kurunjang	10,070	10,711
Melton	8,069	7,953
Melton South	11,517	11,362
Melton West	17,589	8,784
Mount Cottrell^	569	496
Parwan^	170	188
Plumpton	4,324	79
Ravenhall	1,157	2,295
Rockbank	1,536	2,583
Strathtulloh	*	3,997
Taylors Hill	14,921	15,419
Thornhill Park	*	3,066
Toolern Vale^	724	818
Truganina^	20,687	36,305
Weir Views	*	4,398

^ - Territory divided with another LGA
* - Not noted in 2016 Census
# - Not noted in 2021 Census

== Population ==
Year	Population	Annual Growth (%)
1954	1,424	N/A
1958	1,580	2.63
1961	1,804	4.52
1966	2,542	7.10
1971	5,974	18.64
1976	13,856	18.32
1981	21,300	8.98
1986	29,500	6.73
1991	35,695	3.89
1996	39,109	1.84
2001	51,685	5.73
2006	78,448	8.70
2011	109,259	7.86
2016	135,443	
2021	178,960	

== Residential estates ==
Recent large housing projects include:

- Atherstone, within the new suburbs of Cobblebank and Strathtulloh. ($1.2 billion).
- Eynesbury Township.
- Waterford Estate, in the suburb of Weir Views.
- Woodlea, within the new suburb of Aintree.
- Seventh Bend, within the new suburb of Weir Views.

== See also ==
- List of places on the Victorian Heritage Register in the City of Melton
