= Electoral district of Melton =

State electoral district of Victoria, Australia

Melton Victoria—Legislative Assembly
- Interactive map of electoral district boundaries from the 2022 state election
- State: Victoria
- Created: 1992
- MP: Steve McGhie
- Party: Labor
- Electors: 53,306 (2018)
- Area: 332 km^{2} (128.2 sq mi)
- Demographic: Outer metropolitan
Electorates around Melton:
Eureka	Macedon	Sunbury
Eureka	Melton	Sydenham
Eureka	Werribee	Kororoit

The electoral district of Melton is an electoral district of the Victorian Legislative Assembly. It contains the towns of Brookfield, Cobblebank, Exford, Harkness, Hopetoun Park, Kurunjang, Melton, Melton South, Melton West, Merrimu, Strathtulloh, Thornhill Park, Toolern Vale, Weir Views, as well as parts of Eynesbury, Grangefields, Mount Cottrell and Parwan.

== Members for Melton ==
Member	Party	Term
David Cunningham	Labor	1992–1999
Don Nardella	Labor	1999–2017
Don Nardella	Independent	2017–2018
Steve McGhie	Labor	2018–2026

== Election results ==
2022 Victorian state election: Melton
Party	Candidate	Votes	%	±%
Labor	Steve McGhie	14,193	37.7	+3.3
Liberal	Graham Watt	9,155	24.3	+7.9
Independent	Ian Birchall	3,403	9.1	−4.2
Independent	Jarrod James Bingham	2,186	5.8	+0.8
Greens	Praise Morris	1,711	4.6	0.0
Shooters, Fishers, Farmers	Paul Blackborrow	1,682	4.5	+4.5
Democratic Labour	Ashley Alp	1,629	4.3	+1.5
Family First	Richard Brunt	946	2.5	+2.5
Animal Justice	Fiona Adin-James	743	2.0	−0.8
Freedom	Tony Dobran	717	1.9	+1.9
Justice	Samantha Jane Donald	663	1.8	+1.8
New Democrats	Jasleen Kaur	242	0.6	+0.6
Health Australia	Lucienne Ciappara	219	0.6	+0.6
Independent	Jason Spencer Perera	130	0.3	+0.3
Total formal votes		37,619	88.9	–1.1
Informal votes		4,716	11.1	+1.1
Turnout		42,335	84.4	+7.2
Two-party-preferred result
Labor	Steve McGhie	20,538	54.6	−0.4
Liberal	Graham Watt	17,081	45.4	+0.4
Labor hold		Swing	−0.4	
