= Eynesbury, Victoria =

Eynesbury
- Town
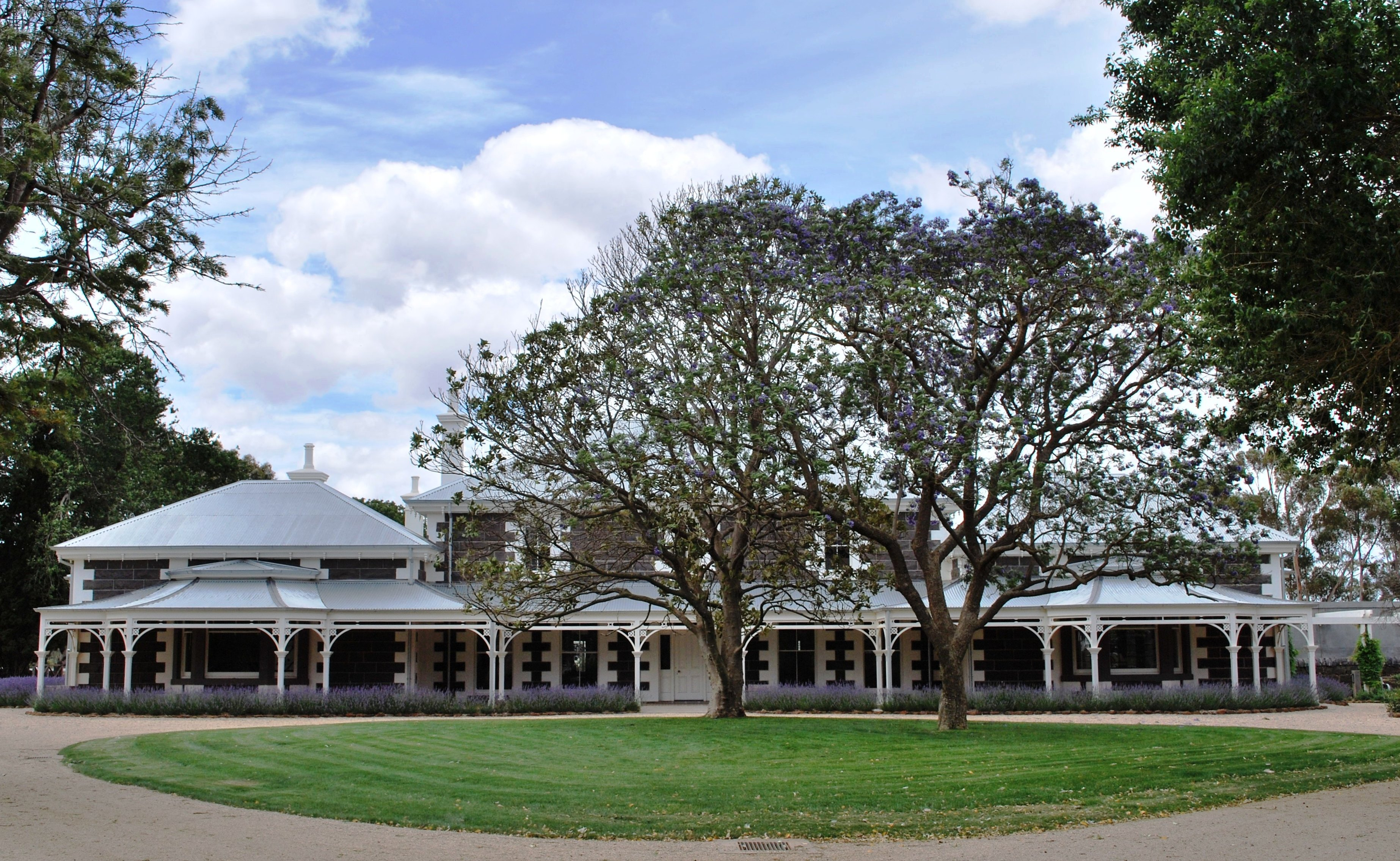
- The Eynesbury Station Homestead, now a club and function room

- Interactive map of Eynesbury
- Coordinates: 37°46′8″S 144°34′8″E
- Country: Australia
- State: Victoria
- City: Melbourne
- LGAs: City of Melton; City of Wyndham
- Location: 44 km (27 mi) W of Melbourne; 12 km (7.5 mi) S of Melton; 15 km (9.3 mi) NW of Werribee; 64 km (40 mi) NE of Geelong

Government
  - State electorate: Melton
  - Federal division: Hawke
- Elevation: 89 m (292 ft)

Population
  - Total: 2,838 (2021 census)
- Postcode: 3338
Localities around Eynesbury
Parwan	Exford	Weir Views
Parwan	Eynesbury	Mount Cottrell
Balliang East	Quandong	Wyndham Vale

Eynesbury is a town in Victoria, Australia, 44 km (27 mi) west of Melbourne's Central Business District, located within the Cities of Melton and Wyndham local government areas. Eynesbury recorded a population of 2,838 at the 2021 census.

== History ==
Eynesbury was named after a town in the United Kingdom (north of London) where Simon Staughton was born (1797). Mr Staughton moved with his family to Australia in 1841 and settled on 101,000 acres which was subsequently subdivided in 1852.

The township of Melton was created from the 30,600 acre subdivision. When Mr Staughton died in 1863 his four sons and one daughter inherited his holdings of 70,400 acres. In 1870 the property was divided into four lots: Exford; Nerowie; Staughton Vale and Eynesbury – each station apart from Eynesbury had its own Homestead.

The Eynesbury Homestead constructed by Samuel Thomas Staughton Sr. in 1872 was the grandest of the four homesteads. Samuel Staughton inherited the 20,000 acre Eynesbury property from his father Simon. It has been restored and is listed as a Place of State Significance by the Heritage Council Victoria. This also includes the Bluestone Men's Quarters (now the Golf Club locker rooms); coach house and stables (now the Golf Club pro-shop).

The Eynesbury Station complex has 60 buildings and structures dating from 1870 to the 1940s including a shearing complex, manager's quarters and two unique Myer "Kit" homes.

In 1947, Eynesbury Station was purchased by M. L. & J. M. Baillieu. Former Premier of Victoria, Ted Baillieu, moved the family assets into a separate account to avoid accusations of a conflict of interest during the 2010 Victorian state election. The family later sold their interests in 2014.

== Eynesbury residential development ==
A $400 million residential subdivision called 'Eynesbury Township' was controversially approved in 2002 by the Victorian Government after planning documents were lodged in 2000. Its total land area is 7,896 ha, with 1,224 ha (or 16 percent) allocated to development with approximately 4,500 lots. All residential lots became part of the Eynesbury Owners Corporation PS543210K.

=== Controversy ===
132 environmental and community groups criticised the approval of a large residential development in a 'Green Wedge Zone', a planning control intended to protect and conserve existing flora and fauna in and around Greater Melbourne. Concerns in particular were raised about the ecologically significant grey box forest, which is home to several endangered species.

A coalition of legal, community and environmental groups appealed to the Commonwealth Government to overturn the development approval. The grounds for the appeal were that the development would threaten several endangered species, including the golden sun moth, southern brown bandicoot and growling grass frog. An independent consultant's report found significant populations of these species. The Prime Minister of Australia, John Howard, referred it to the Federal Minister for the Environment, Ian Campbell. He ascertained that the project did not require approval from the Commonwealth and allowed the development to proceed.

=== Development ===
In 2007, Woodhouse Developments Pty Ltd and Villa World (Vic) Pty Ltd lodged documentation to commence construction.

Eynesbury houses a wedding reception centre, using the restored Eynesbury Homestead, and an 18-hole golf course. All buildings are connected to Class A recycled water. This supply is delivered via a controlled 'third pipe' system, completely separate from the regular drinking water. The recycled water system can be used to supply toilets, laundries, wash cars, and irrigate parks and gardens.

As of late 2020, Eynesbury had approximately 948 lots, with additional lots in Stages 4 and 11 and the new Stage 5 set to title in the second or third quarter of the financial year.

=== Financial issues ===
Eynesbury has gone through several changes of ownership and finance. Both of the original companies, Woodhouse Developments Pty Ltd and Villa World, disposed of their interests in the development over the course of its construction.

Several years after construction commenced, Villa World negotiated to sell undeveloped land parcels in the development to Hyde Property Group. The $60 million agreement was made in 2013 but Hyde Property Group defaulted twice on its payments. It took until 2017 before the dispute was resolved.

Hyde Property Group soon attempted to subdivide and sell off the estate. However, the company was declared insolvent after it allegedly failed to pay consultants for completed work. Another company, Fucheng Group, also pursued Hyde Property Group in a separate dispute over the sale of land on which the Eynesbury Homestead is located. A settlement was reached on the first dispute just before it was due for hearings before the Supreme Court of Victoria, but the dispute with Fucheng Group has continued and is due to be heard in the Supreme Court of Victoria.

Soon afterwards in November 2018, another development company, Resimax Group, announced that it would partner with Hyde Property Group to continue the Eynesbury development.

== Geography ==
=== Biodiversity ===
It is home to one of Victoria's largest remaining grey box forests which is registered with the National Estate and is included within the Melton City Natural Heritage Overlay. The forest is bisected by the main road to Eynesbury and contains native flora and fauna including the endangered migratory swift parrot, the diamond firetail, the native barking owl. It is also home to the threatened tree species including the buloke. Other animals living in the area include the brown treecreeper (a bird of state significance), kangaroos, emus, blue wrens and speckled warblers. A number of walking trails have been built through the forest

These endangered flora and fauna have been threatened by increased human activity in the area, such as road construction and housing development for Eynesbury.

=== Bushfire risk ===
Eynesbury has been classified as an area of high bushfire risk by the Country Fire Authority, Melton City Council and the Department of Environment, Land, Water and Planning (DELWP).

Several fires have threatened Eynesbury, including in 2013 and 2017. The location and design of the Estate has its fire risk.

== Recreation ==
The Eynesbury Recreational Reserve was constructed and open for use in 2021. It was jointly funded by local, state and federal governments, as well as AFL Victoria and is the home ground of the Eynesbury Cricket Club and Eynesbury Football Club (both nicknamed the 'Eagles')

== Transport ==
=== Road ===
There are only three roads that connect Eynesbury to other towns. Mount Mary Road runs south to Quandong and Wyndham City, whilst Eynesbury Road and Green Hill Road connect north to Exford and the City of Melton.

=== Bus ===
One bus route has serviced Eynesbury since 2024, connecting the town to V/Line services on the Ararat and Ballarat lines:

- 452 : Melton Station – Eynesbury via Weir Views. Operated by Christians Bus Co.
