= Brookfield, Victoria =

Brookfield
- Suburb
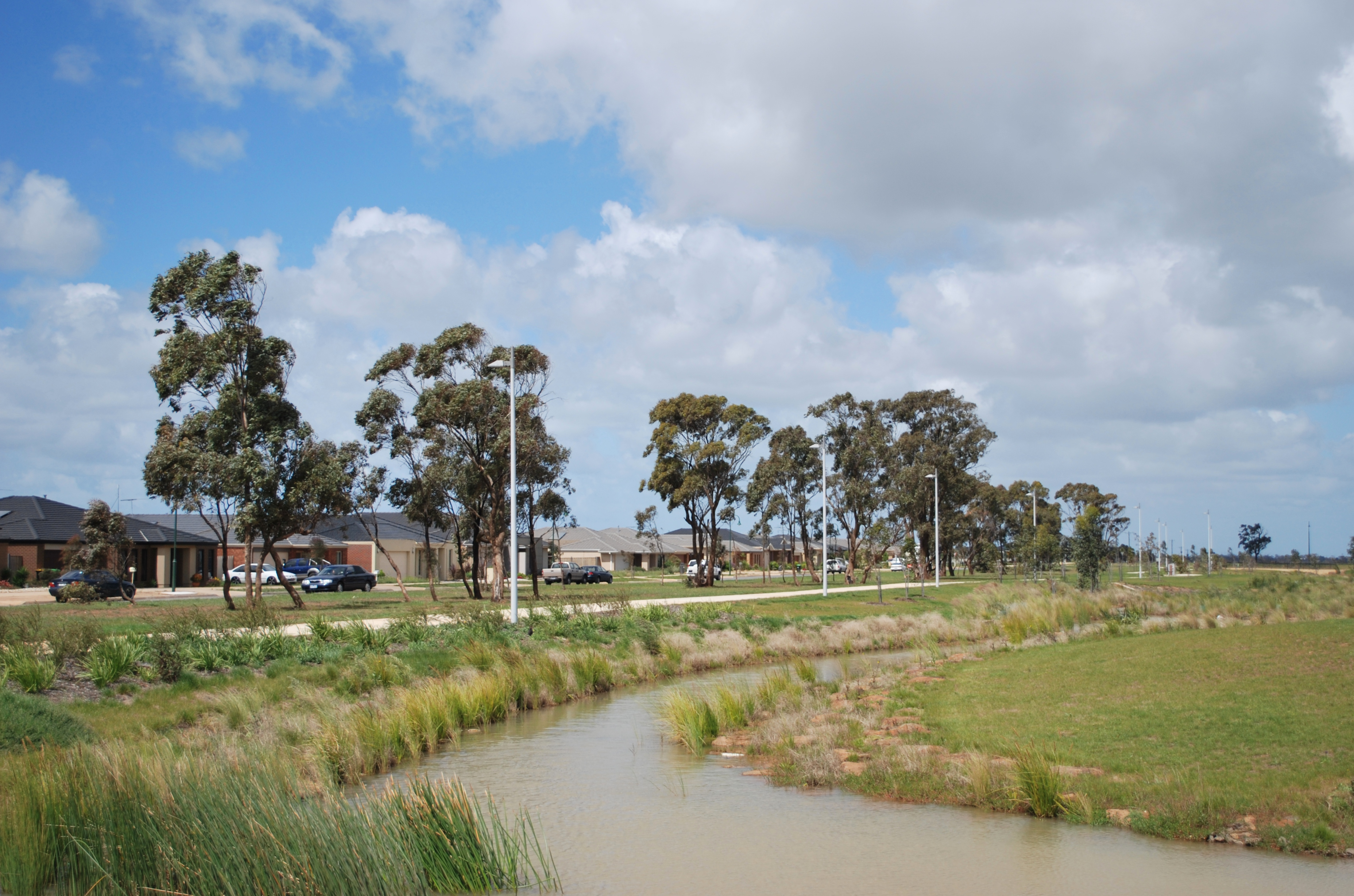
- The Botanica Springs estate

- Interactive map of Brookfield
- Coordinates: 37.675°S 144.525°E
- Country: Australia
- State: Victoria
- LGA: City of Melton
- Location: 39 km (24 mi) W of Melbourne; 2 km (1.2 mi) SW of Melton

Government
  - State electorate: Melton
  - Federal division: Hawke

Population
  - Total: 10,782 (2021 census)
- Postcode: 3338
Suburbs around Brookfield
Long Forest	Melton West	Melton
Hopetoun Park	Brookfield	Melton South
Parwan	Exford	Weir Views

Brookfield is a suburb in Victoria, Australia, 39 km (24 mi) west of Melbourne's Central Business District, located within the City of Melton local government area. Brookfield recorded a population of 10,782 at the 2021 census.

Brookfield was first established as Brookfield Estates by Oliver Hume Real Estate in the early 1980s to 1990s during the Melton area's rapid expansion. Since then, it has also expanded into the new estates of Madison Gardens, Botanica Springs and Silverdale.
