= Exford, Victoria =

Exford
- Town
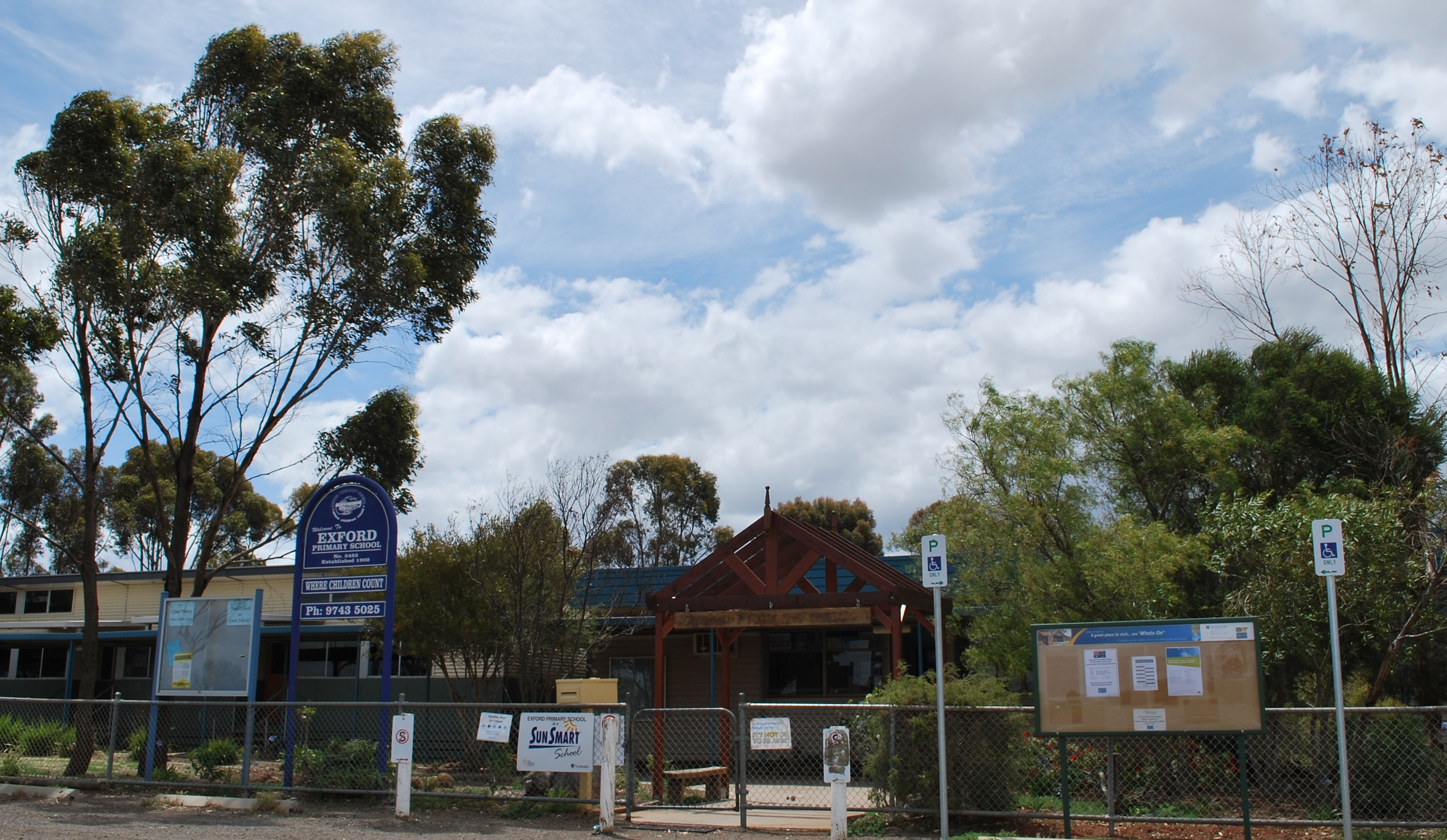
- Exford Primary School

- Interactive map of Exford
- Coordinates: 37°44′42″S 144°33′32″E
- Country: Australia
- State: Victoria
- LGA: City of Melton
- Location: 39 km (24 mi) W of Melbourne; 6 km (3.7 mi) SW of Melton

Government
  - State electorate: Melton
  - Federal division: Hawke
- Elevation: 92 m (302 ft)

Population
  - Total: 133 (2021 census)
- Postcode: 3338
Localities around Exford
Brookfield	Weir Views	Weir Views
Parwan	Exford	Weir Views
Parwan	Eynesbury	Mount Cottrell

Exford is a town in Victoria, Australia, 39 km (24 mi) west of Melbourne's Central Business District, located within the City of Melton local government area. Exford recorded a population of 133 at the 2021 census.

The town is located on the west and south bank of the Melton Reservoir, which was completed in 1916 to supply the Werribee Irrigation District, and also functions as a recreation site with barbecue and picnic facilities. Exford Post Office opened on 1 September 1911 and closed in 1964.

Exford is home to the Melbourne Runabout and Speedboat Club. A primary school with 200 students is also based in Exford. On Tuesday May 16 2023, a bus carrying 46 children from the school was involved in an accident with a truck at a nearby intersection with 18 children rushed to hospital.
