= Melton Highway =

Highway in Victoria, Australia

Melton Highway Victoria
- Coordinates: 37.695420°S 144.603876°E (West end); 37.701839°S 144.801928°E (East end)

General information
- Type: Highway
- Length: 18.9 km (12 mi)
- Route number(s): C754 (1998–present) Entire route; Concurrencies: C801 (1998–present) (through Melton)
- Former route number: Metro Route 54 (1989–1998)

Major junctions
- West end: Ferris Road; Melton, Melbourne
- Western Freeway; High Street; Federation Drive; Kings Road; Sunshine Avenue
- East end: Calder Freeway; Taylors Lakes, Melbourne

Location(s)
- Major suburbs: Plumpton, Bonnie Brook, Hillside, Sydenham, Taylors Lakes

Highway system
- Highways in Australia; National Highway • Freeways in Australia; Highways in Victoria

Melton Highway (formerly Keilor–Melton Road) links Melbourne's outer north-western suburbs of Melton and Taylors Lakes (western Keilor as the old name suggests), connecting the Western Freeway and Calder Freeway to provide a more-direct route between Ballarat and Melbourne and Essendon airports; it has a Victorian route designation of C754/A82.

== Route ==
Melton Highway commences at the diamond interchange with Western Freeway and heads north as a four-lane, dual-carriageway road, intersecting shortly afterwards with High Street through central Melton, and then Gisborne-Melton Road, before narrowing back to a dual-lane, single-carriageway road heading east, sign-posted at 70 km/h as the road bends and dips to cross Kororoit Creek, increases to 80 km/h. The speed limit remains at 80 km/h approaching Hillside, where the road widens to a four-lane, dual-carriageway and continues east through Sydenham and Taylors Lakes, past Watergardens Town Centre, to eventually terminate at the intersection with Sunshine Avenue in Keilor. Increases in traffic has seen the road upgraded with many overtaking lanes, and increasing residential levels at the eastern (Sydenham) end has seen further duplication of carriageways and reconstruction of the railway crossing just north of Sydenham (Watergardens) station.

== History ==
The alignment of Keilor–Melton Road was altered at both ends through the 1980s:

- its eastern end in Keilor, originally terminating with the Calder Highway (today Old Calder Highway) in northern Keilor, was truncated to terminate at Sunshine Avenue to provision new ramps to the Calder Freeway when the Keilor bypass opened in 1984; the former alignment is now known as Old Calder Highway
- its western end in Melton, originally terminating with the Western Highway (today High Street) in central Melton, was re-aligned to terminate at a new interchange with the Western Freeway when the Melton bypass opened in 1987; the former alignment is now known as Melton Valley Drive and Sherwin Court

Keilor–Melton Road was signed as Metropolitan Route 54 between Melton and Keilor in 1989; with Victoria's conversion to the newer alphanumeric system in the late 1990s, this was replaced with route C754. As of early 2026, new upgrades at intersection of Melton Highway and Leakes road include the addition of a traffic-light controlled intersection. New signposting at said intersection reads ‘Melton Highway - A82’, suggesting the intention of retiring the C754 route designation to better align with the road’s importance, higher use and the road’s conditions, which now align with the standards of A classification roads.

The passing of the Transport Act 1983 (itself an evolution from the original Highways and Vehicles Act 1924) provided for the declaration of State Highways, roads two-thirds financed by the State government through the Road Construction Authority (later VicRoads). The State Highway (Keilor-Melton Road) was declared a State Highway in November 1989, from Western Freeway in Melton to Sunshine Avenue in Taylors Lakes where it meets the ramps to the Calder Freeway, then re-declared as the Melton Highway just over a year later in December 1990, within the same alignment.

The passing of the Road Management Act 2004 granted the responsibility of overall management and development of Victoria's major arterial roads to VicRoads: in 2004, VicRoads re-declared Melton Highway (Arterial #6040) from Western Freeway in Melton to Sunshine Avenue in Taylors Lakes.

In September 2018, the former level crossing through the Sunbury/Bendigo railway line was replaced by a new 6-lane bridge overpass, with new bike lanes and footpaths on each side, and new paths underneath. The railway carries more than 200 trains each weekday and the road carries 38,000 vehicles per day.

== Intersections ==
LGA	Location	km	mi	Destinations	Notes
Melton	Cobblebank–Melton boundary	0.0	0.0	Ferris Road – Cobblebank	Western terminus of highway and routes C754/C801, continues south as Ferris Road
Melton	Cobblebank–Melton boundary	0.0	0.0	Western Freeway (M8) – Ballarat, Bacchus Marsh, Deer Park	
Melton	Melton	0.5	0.31	High Street (C801) – Melton	Eastern terminus of concurrency with route C801
Melton	Melton	1.2	0.75	Federation Drive (Gisborne-Melton Road) (C705) – Toolern Vale, Gisborne	
Melton	Plumpton–Bonnie Brook boundary	6.3	3.9	Leakes Road – Plumpton, Rockbank	
Melton	Plumpton–Bonnie Brook boundary	9.5	5.9	Plumpton Road – Plumpton, Bonnie Brook	
Melton	Hillside	13.7	8.5	The Parks (north) – Hillside; Gourlay Road (south) – Taylors Hill	
Melton–Brimbank boundary	Hillside–Sydenham boundary	14.7	9.1	Calder Park Drive – Calder Park, Taylors Hill	
Brimbank	Sydenham–Taylors Lakes boundary	15.9	9.9	Bendigo railway line	
Brimbank	Taylors Lakes	17.0	10.6	Kings Road (Metro Route 77) – Keilor North, Deer Park, to Calder Freeway (M79 west) – Bendigo	
Brimbank	Taylors Lakes–Keilor Lodge–Keilor tripoint	18.9	11.7	Sunshine Avenue (Metro Route 41) – Keilor Lodge, Sunshine, Altona	
Brimbank	Taylors Lakes–Keilor Lodge–Keilor tripoint	18.9	11.7	Calder Freeway (M79 east) – Essendon, City, Melbourne Airport	Eastern terminus of highway and route C754
1.000 mi = 1.609 km; 1.000 km = 0.621 mi: Concurrency terminus; Route transition

== See also ==
- Highways in Australia
- Highways in Victoria
- List of highways in Melbourne
