= Western suburbs (Melbourne) =

The Western Suburbs is the metropolitan area directly west of the Melbourne Central Business District in Melbourne, Victoria, Australia.

== Municipalities ==
There are five main municipalities ("cities" or "councils") in the western suburbs. These are:

- City of Brimbank
- City of Hobsons Bay
- City of Maribyrnong
- City of Melton
- City of Wyndham

== Major suburbs, satellite cities and commercial areas ==
The western suburbs of Melbourne boast some of the oldest landmarks and housing in Melbourne, while also introducing new suburbs and a large portion of Melbourne's proud multicultural community. Suburbs include:

=== City of Brimbank ===
- Sunshine
- St Albans
- Taylors Lakes
- Deer Park
- Albion
- Sunshine North
- Albanvale
- Kings Park
- Delahey
- Cairnlea
- Kealba
- Derrimut
- Keilor Downs
- Sydenham
- Keilor
- Hillside
- Sunshine West
- Keilor Lodge
- Ardeer
- Keilor Park

=== City of Maribyrnong ===
- Footscray
- Maribyrnong
- Braybrook
- West Footscray
- Maidstone
- Tottenham
- Seddon
- Kingsville
- Yarraville

=== City of Melton ===
- Melton
- Caroline Springs
- Melton West
- Melton South
- Brookfield
- Kurunjang
- Aintree
- Harkness
- Rockbank
- Thornhill Park
- Cobblebank
- Weir Views
- Strathtulloh
- Taylors Hill
- Hillside
- Fraser Rise
- Burnside
- Burnside Heights

=== City of Wyndham ===
- Werribee
- Tarneit
- Point Cook
- Truganina
- Laverton
- Manor Lakes
- Hoppers Crossing
- Wyndham Vale
- Mambourin
- Williams Landing
- Werribee South

=== City of Hobsons Bay ===
- Williamstown
- Altona
- Newport
- Seaholme
- Williamstown North
- South Kingsville
- Spotswood
- Altona North
- Brooklyn
- Altona Meadows
- Seabrook

== Road Setup ==
The western suburbs have relied for years on the transportation directly from famous long stretches of road that have now been connected to large freeways for easy access to Melbourne's CBD and neighbouring suburbs.

Major roads are:

- Anderson Road
- Ballarat Road
- Derrimut Road
- Heaths Road
- M80 Ring Road (formally as Western Ring Road)
- Melton Highway (C754)
- Sayers Road
- Station Road
- West Gate Bridge
