= Electoral district of Keilor =

Former state electoral district of Victoria, Australia

Keilor Victoria—Legislative Assembly
- State: Victoria
- Created: 1976
- Abolished: 2014
- MP: Natalie Hutchins
- Party: Labor Party
- Electors: 52,853 (2010)
- Area: 70 km^{2} (27.0 sq mi)
- Demographic: Metropolitan

The Electoral district of Keilor was a metropolitan electorate approximately 15 kilometres north-west of Melbourne, Australia in Victoria's Legislative Assembly.

The Keilor District covered an area of 70 square kilometres, including the suburbs of Hillside, Keilor Downs, Keilor Lodge, Taylors Hill and Sydenham and parts of the suburbs of Caroline Springs, Keilor and Plumpton.

It was abolished in 2014 and replaced by Sydenham.

== Members for Keilor ==
Member	Party	Term
Jack Ginifer	Labor	1976–1982
George Seitz	Labor	1982–2010
Natalie Hutchins	Labor	2010–2014

== Election results ==
2010 Victorian state election: Keilor
Party	Candidate	Votes	%	±%
Labor	Natalie Hutchins	22,943	49.84	−8.61
Liberal	Damon Ryder	14,367	31.21	+6.32
Greens	Lisa Asbury	3,625	7.88	−0.58
Family First	Scott Amberley	2,627	5.71	−2.49
Independent	Harpreet Walia	2,468	5.36	+5.36
Total formal votes		46,030	92.93	−0.78
Informal votes		3,502	7.07	+0.78
Turnout		49,532	93.72	−0.12
Two-party-preferred result
Labor	Natalie Hutchins	27,788	60.33	−9.08
Liberal	Damon Ryder	18,269	39.67	+9.08
Labor hold		Swing	−9.08	

== See also ==
- Parliaments of the Australian states and territories
- List of members of the Victorian Legislative Assembly
