= Prefabricated building, Keilor Park =

Heritage-listed house in Melbourne, Victoria, Australia

Prefabricated building
- Location of the cottage in Greater Metropolitan Melbourne
- Alternative names: Keilor Police Hut

General information
- Status: Completed
- Type: Cottage
- Architectural style: Old Colonial
- Location: 152 Harrick Road, Keilor Park, City of Brimbank, Melbourne, Victoria, Australia
- Coordinates: 37°43′14″S 144°50′48″E
- Completed: c.1850; 176 years ago
- Relocated: 2021
- Renovated: 2021
- Client: Victoria Police
- Owner: City of Brimbank

Technical details
- Structural system: Prefabricated
- Material: Corrugated iron sheets; timber

Renovating team
- Architect: Andronas Conservation Architecture
- Awards: AIA (Victoria): Architecture Award for Heritage – Conservation (2022)

Victorian Heritage Register
- Official name: Prefabricated building
- Type: Registered place
- Designated: 14 February 2002
- Reference no.: H1971
- Heritage overlay no.: HO14
- Category: Law Enforcement

The prefabricated building, also called the Keilor Police Hut, is a prefabricated cottage located at 152 Harrick Road, (Note: The cottage is not the same as Harricks Cottage, Harrick Road, built on allotments 15 and 41 in the Town of Keilor, Parish of Doutta Galla, in the County of Bourke, also a wrought iron and timber cottage, that was added to the non-statutory and now defunct Register of the National Estate on 27 October 1998. A report published by the City of Brimbank in 2000, lists the two properties separately, with different descriptions – in summary format – and locations, prior to its 2021 restoration and relocation. Also, the 2023 news story and the 2022 conservation award clearly indicate that the cottages are co-located, but not the same structures.) in Keilor Park, in the City of Brimbank, in the western suburbs of Melbourne, in Victoria, Australia. The prefabricated cottage is a prefabricated building imported to Victoria in the early gold rush period, most probably from England.

Erected from the c. 1850s – c. 1860s on the traditional lands of the Wurundjeri people, the cottage was added to the Victorian Heritage Register on 14 February 2002 in recognition of its historical and scientific (technological) significance; and was also added to a non-statutory list by the City of Brimbank.

== History ==
=== Colonial settlement of the area ===
In 1840 William Taylor, a pioneer Scottish-born pastoralist, arrived in the District of Port Phillip in the company of Dugald McPherson and together they took up several pastoral runs in the Wimmera region. In 1849, Taylor established another pastoral run at Overnewton on the Salt Water River, close to the ford crossing. A small settlement including one of the first inns erected in the district grew up in an ad hoc manner at this crossing place. The village of Keilor was gazetted as a township in 1850 and, during the Victorian gold rush period, thousands of diggers used the crossing place on the Salt Water River at Keilor on their way to the Central Victorian goldfields. The infant township burgeoned in the 1850s and agriculturists set up small farms on the alluvial flats to provide fresh produce to the miners. Many of the first settlers were Irish immigrants who had fled Ireland after the potato famine of 1846 or who were later attracted to the Victorian colony by the prospect of striking it rich on the Victorian goldfields.

In order to accommodate rapid population growth, as a result of the gold rush in Victoria and the shortfall in building stock, large-scale importation of prefabricated buildings, including for domestic and government use, was widespread during the 1850s.

=== Site history ===
There is circumstantial evidence that the cottage may have been part of the Keilor Plains police station, which was established approximately five kilometres (three miles) along the road to the goldfields from Keilor in 1853. That station is known to have included corrugated iron and timber and iron buildings, and must have been located within close distance of the site of the cottage. The police moved to a site in the township of Keilor in 1858, taking a number of the buildings with them. If the cottage was part of that complex, it is unlikely that it was left on the Keilor Plains site. The station was moved again to a site next to the courthouse in 1862–1863, and was closed in 1873. The cottage now stands in the scattered remains of a later homestead complex, with the only other standing building a twentieth century stables/shed.

== Description ==
The Old Colonial-style cottage is rectangular in plan with external walls and arch roof of galvanised corrugated wrought iron, with a thirteen-centimetre (five-inch) pitch. The structural frame comprises horizontal wrought iron angle top and bottom plates bolted to vertical cast iron corner angles and intermediate supports. The cast iron pilasters have slightly recessed panels terminating in semicircular arches. The interior is lightly framed in timber to take the windows and a timber or fabric lining. Internally there are large hand painted numerals on various components likely to have aided in assembly. The framing, windows, and two fireplace openings indicate that the building was probably used for residential purposes.

=== Relocation and restoration ===
In the latter part of the twentieth century, the cottage fell into a state of disrepair; and, c. 2015, it was relocated from its former location near the Calder Freeway; off Oaklands Avenue, in Keilor North, and reconstructed at 152 Harrick Road, on a site owned by the City of Brimbank. In 2021, the cottage was restored, and the restoration and conservation project won the Australian Institute of Architects Victorian Chapter 2022 Architecture Award for Heritage – Conservation. As part of the restoration and conservation, most of the structure was retained with interpretive interventions that included the structure placed on a concrete slab, the introduction of tensile restraints, the replacement of lost fenestration, and a partial reline of the interior.

== See also ==
- Architecture of Melbourne
- List of places on the Victorian Heritage Register in the City of Brimbank
