= Keilor Botanic Gardens =

Botanical gardens in Melbourne, Australia

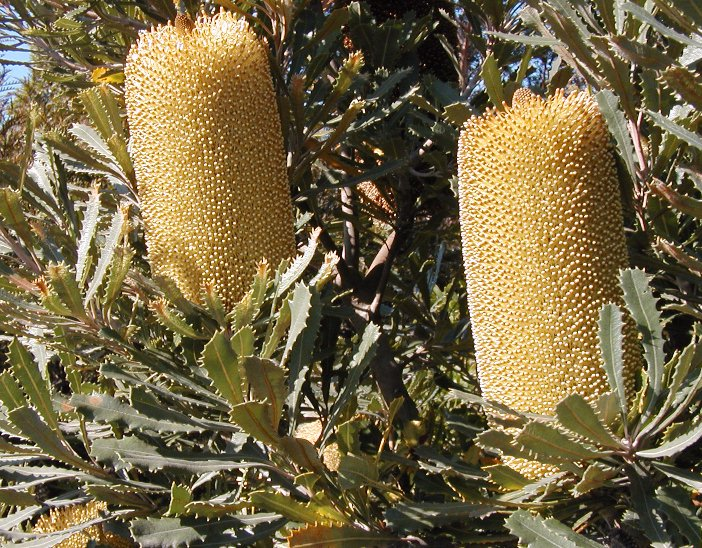
- Banksia media inflorescences in the gardens

- Location within Melbourne
- Interactive map of Keilor Botanic Gardens
- Type: Botanical garden
- Location: Keilor, Melbourne, Victoria
- Coordinates: 37°42′46″S 144°51′31″E
- Area: 10 ha (25 acres)
- Opened: 1982; 44 years ago
- Operator: City of Brimbank
- Status: Open
- Vegetation: Australian native plants

The Keilor Botanic Gardens is a 10-hectare (25-acre) botanical garden located in Keilor Park, a north-western suburb of Melbourne, in Victoria, Australia. Created in 1982, the gardens are entirely devoted to Australian native flora and are managed by the City of Brimbank as part of Keilor Park Reserve and Botanic Gardens.

== Gallery ==
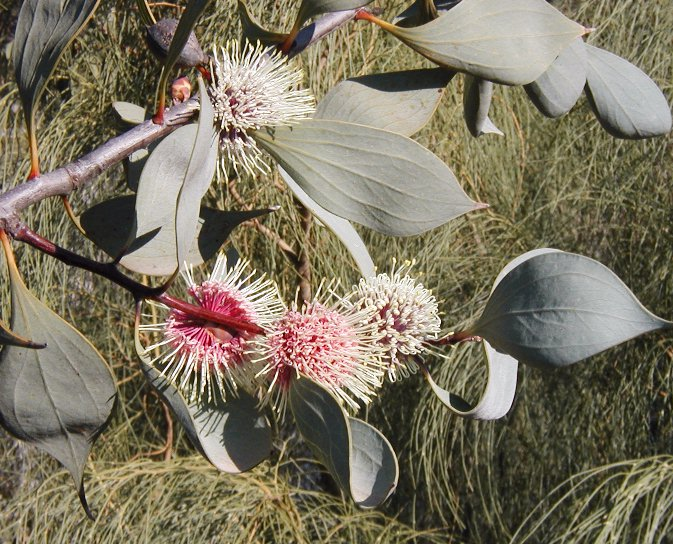
Hakea petiolaris inflorescences

== See also ==
- Parks and gardens of Melbourne
- List of botanical gardens in Victoria
