= Keilor Hotel =

Heritage-listed hotel in Melbourne, Victoria, Australia

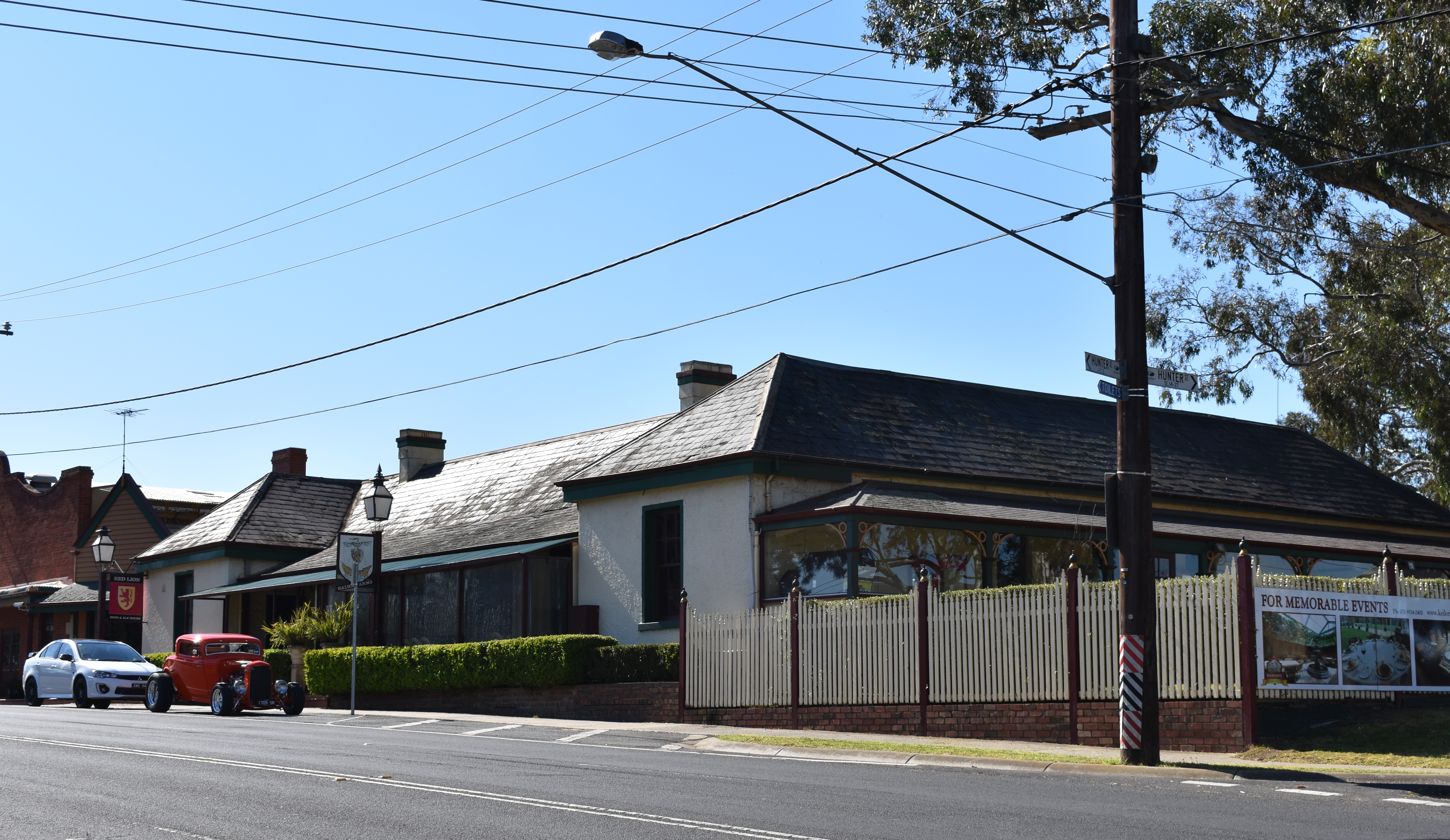
- The hotel in 2018

- Location of the hotel in Greater Metropolitan Melbourne
- Interactive map of the Keilor Hotel area
- Former names: Galway Arms Tavern; Red Lion

General information
- Status: Completed
- Type: Hotel
- Architectural style: Old Colonial Georgian
- Location: 670–674 Old Calder Highway, Keilor, City of Brimbank, Melbourne, Victoria, Australia
- Coordinates: 37°43′11″S 144°50′11″E
- Completed: 1848; 178 years ago
- Owner: Dodd and Goudie families (since 1862)

Technical details
- Material: Bluestone; slate

Website
- keilorhotel.com.au

Victorian Heritage Register
- Official name: Keilor Hotel
- Type: Registered place
- Designated: 14 February 2002
- Reference no.: H1974
- Heritage overlay no.: HO12
- Category: Recreation and Entertainment

Register of the National Estate
- Official name: Keilor Hotel
- Type: Defunct register
- Designated: undated
- Reference no.: 103747

The Keilor Hotel is a hotel located at 670–674 Old Calder Highway, in Keilor, in the City of Brimbank, in the western suburbs of Melbourne, in Victoria, Australia.

Built in 1848 on the traditional lands of the Wurundjeri people, the hotel was added to the Victorian Heritage Register on 14 February 2002 in recognition of its historical and architectural significance; and was also added to the non-statutory and now defunct Register of the National Estate on an unknown date.

== Description ==
The Keilor Hotel is an Old Colonial Georgian-style single storey bluestone building with a slate roof and two projecting hipped bays on either side of a recessed verandah. The bluestone walls were subsequently rendered and the hotel has retained its original form and, as of 2022, was still in operation.

The hotel, believed to have been constructed in 1848, is located on the main road to Macedon, now called the Old Calder Highway, a site chosen so as to attract passing trade, and was an important stopping place for travellers enroute to squatting runs to the north and west of Melbourne, and later to the Central Victorian goldfields. In 1854, Cobb & Co began running their coaches to the goldfields of Castlemaine and Bendigo, with Keilor as their first main stop. Their practice was to arrange the journey in stretches of approximately sixteen kilometres (ten miles) each, and to change horses at the end of each stretch. The Keilor Hotel was approximately that distance from the Melbourne town centre, and was therefore became a regular coach stop.

Called the Galway Arms Tavern in 1853, and then the Red Lion, the name of the pub was changed to the Keilor Hotel in 1862 when Mathew Goudie bought the hotel for £1,000; and it has been retained in the Dodd and Goudie families since 1862 – and as of November 2020, the hotel was owned by Ray Dodd. The pub claims to be Australia's oldest family-owned hotel.

== See also ==
- Architecture of Melbourne
- List of places on the Victorian Heritage Register in the City of Brimbank
