= Hillside, Victoria =

Hillside
- Suburb
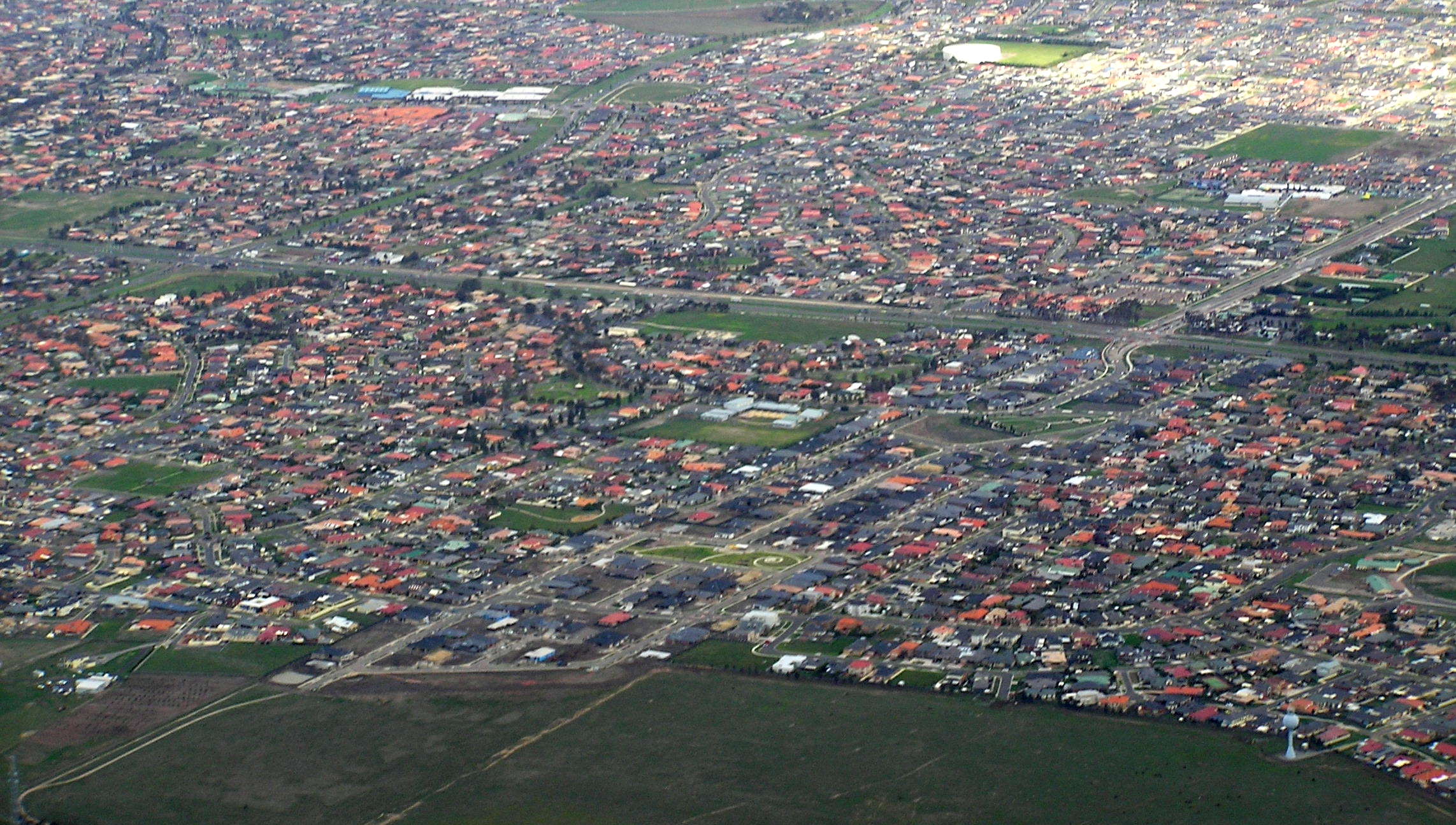
- Aerial view of Hillside from north west

- Interactive map of Hillside
- Coordinates: 37.687°S 144.743°E
- Country: Australia
- State: Victoria
- City: Melbourne
- LGAs: City of Brimbank; City of Melton
- Location: 24 km (15 mi) from Melbourne

Government
  - State electorate: Sydenham
  - Federal divisions: Gorton; Hawke

Area
  - Total: 8.1 km^{2} (3.1 sq mi)

Population
  - Total: 17,331 (2021 census)
  - Density: 2,140/km^{2} (5,540/sq mi)
- Postcode: 3037
Suburbs around Hillside
Plumpton	Diggers Rest	Calder Park
Plumpton	Hillside	Sydenham
Caroline Springs		Taylors Hill

Hillside is a suburb in Melbourne, Victoria, Australia, 24 km (15 mi) north-west of Melbourne's Central Business District, located within the Cities of Brimbank and Melton local government areas. Hillside recorded a population of 17,331 at the 2021 census.

There is another locality in Victoria named Hillside, a small rural district near Bairnsdale.

The suburb of Hillside was previously part of the neighbouring suburb of Sydenham, however its name was changed to Hillside approximately 18 years ago. It has estates with names of Cypress Rise, Banchory Grove, Parkwood Green, Bellevue Hill, Sugargum Estate, Hillside 2000 and Regency Rise. A large water tower (known as "The Golf Ball" by locals) exists in the estate of The Bellevue, which can be seen from several kilometres around and, along with the large radio transmission towers in nearby Delahey, is a major landmark of the outer north-western suburban area.

== Transport ==
=== Road ===
The Melton Highway connects Hillside to the Melbourne CBD via the Calder Freeway and EastLink. Drivers can also access the Calder Freeway from Calder Park Drive.

=== Rail ===
There are no railway stations in Hillside; the closest railway station is Watergardens station, on the Sunbury line. Some Bendigo line services also stop at Watergardens.

The proposed Calder Park station would be located in Hillside.

=== Buses ===
Three bus routes service Hillside:

460 : Watergardens station – Caroline Springs station via Caroline Springs Town Centre. Operated by CDC Melbourne.

462 : Watergardens station – Caroline Springs Station via CS Square. Operated by CDC Melbourne.

463 : Watergardens station – Hillside. Operated by CDC Melbourne.

== Shopping ==
Watergardens Town Centre is located in nearby Taylors Lakes, with 197 shops. The Banchory Grove Shopping Centre is also located in Hillside, with Woolworths and The Reject Shop as anchor tenants.

Further shopping areas exist on Wattle Valley Drive in the north of Hillside, and on the eastern edge of Hillside, along the Melton Highway.

== Education ==
Hillside contains three primary schools: Sydenham-Hillside Primary School (Hillside campus), Parkwood Green Primary school, and Cana Catholic Primary School.

There are no secondary schools in Hillside, students being zoned for either Springside West Secondary College or Copperfield College, depending on address.

== Sport ==
Sydenham Hillside Football Club, an Australian rules football team, competes in the Essendon District Football League. They play at the Hillside Recreation Reserve, locally known as Shark Park.

== Notable Residents ==
Brandon Praljak, Reggie (Brandog)

== See also ==
- City of Keilor – Hillside was previously within this former local government area.
