= Victoria University Secondary College =

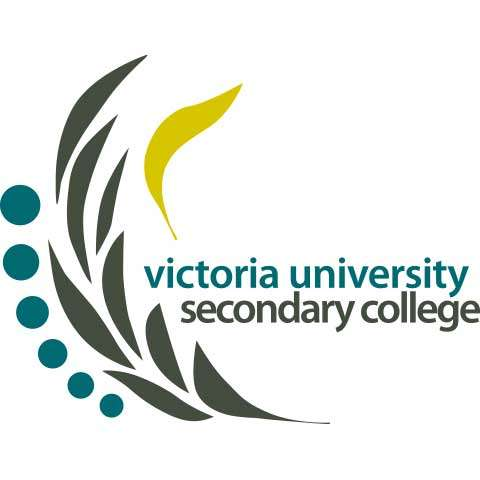
- Cairnlea, Deer Park, St Albans

Information
- Motto: Create the Future
- Established: 2010
- President: Ellen Arnott
- Principal: Elaine Hazim
- Assistant Principals: James Dowie | Glenn Leyland | Jason Austin | Deborah Chapman | Deanne Clark | Sue Atzarakis
- Staff: 180
- Grades: 7–12
- Enrolment: ≈1300
- Campus: Deer Park, Cairnlea, St Albans
- Colours: Teal, White, Dark Grey
- Languages Taught: Chinese
- Website: http://www.vusc.vic.edu.au/

Victoria University Secondary College is a state government co-educational school for years 7–12. The junior campus is located in Deer Park, Victoria, Australia, The senior campus is located in Cairnlea, Victoria, Australia, and the Flexible Learning Campus (iCAN, FLO) in St Albans, Victoria, Australia. The college was founded in 2010, by the merger of 2 schools: Brimbank College and Deer Park Secondary College, and then, in 2011, Kealba Secondary College.

The school offers: VET, VCE VM, VCE and university extension.

== Overview ==
Victoria University Secondary College is a secondary college located in Melbourne, Victoria, Australia.

The college currently runs on three campuses. The school is planning up to expand the Cairnlea campus, to cater to the entire school community.

Genevieve Simson served as the founding college principal of Victoria University Secondary College. In 2018, Simson resigned from her role as college principal, she assumed the executive principal position at Greater Shepparton College in 2020, departing at the end of that year. Elaine Hazim, who, at the time, served as the Senior Campus principal, was appointed college principal in 2019.

Victoria University Secondary College completed construction of a new Senior Campus for Years 10 to 12 at the end of 2021 with operations at the campus commencing in 2022.

== Campuses ==
- Junior Campus in Deer Park for years 7 to 9. Address: 88 Billingham Rd, Deer Park VIC 3023
- Senior Campus in Cairnlea for years 10 to 12. Address: 43 Ken Jordan Rd, Cairnlea VIC 3023
- Brimbank Campus in St Albans, for the college's Flexible In-School Learning Program and senior gymnasium, A portion of the campus is leased by "Big Childcare". Address: 5a Jamieson St, St Albans VIC 3021

== History ==
St Albans Technical School opened on Jamieson Street in 1962, gaining a reputation for academic and sporting achievement in its first decade. The school was originally a boys school, it became a co-ed school in the 1980s. In 1989, it was renamed Jamieson Park Secondary College, and in the late 1990s, it became Brimbank College. The school had various principals over the years, the last being Genevie Simson, who succeeded to the role of college principal at the successor school.

Kealba Secondary College, originally St Albans Park High School, was established in 1970. The inaugural principal, Mr Leo Webb, requested a name change to avoid confusion with St Albans High School. A community group chose the name 'Kealba Secondary College,' which led to the suburb's renaming from St Albans East to Kealba. Julie Williams served as the longest principal, for 25 years, and the final principal, James Dowie, became an assistant principal at the successor school.

Deer Park High School opened on Billingham Road in 1976. It was renamed Deer Park Secondary College. The school had multiple principals over the years, last being Paul Ryan, who succeeded to the role of Deer Park Campus principal at the successor school, he was only in office for one term before retiring and being succeeded by Elaine Hazim (current college principal).

The three schools merged in 2010 to form the dual-campus Victoria University Secondary College (Kealba was closed). Deer Park became the junior campus (Years 07 to 09), Brimbank became the senior campus, (Years 10 to 12). The Brimbank Campus later closed in 2022 after the completion of the Cairnlea Campus, which is now the senior campus. In 2024, the Brimbank Campus became the Flexible Learning Program campus.

== Leadership ==
Current Leadership
College Principal	Elaine Hazim
Senior Campus Principal (years 10-12)	Glenn Leyland
Junior Campus Principal (years 7-9)	Deborah Chapman

== Leadership History ==
The following individuals have served as principal of Victoria University Secondary College:

Ordinal	Principal	Term start	Term end	Time in office	Notes
1	Genevieve Simson	2010	2018	8 years	
2	Elaine Hazim	2019	incumbent	7–8 years	

The following individuals have served as Senior Campus Principal of Victoria University Secondary College:

- During the initial months of the college merger, the campus principal was called the Brimbank Campus Principal instead of the Senior Campus Principal, as both campuses still served students from Year 7 to Year 12 during the transition.
- Since 2022, the Senior Campus has been located at the new Cairnlea campus, rather than the Brimbank Campus. All principals prior to 2022 held office at the Brimbank Campus.

Ordinal	Campus Principal	Term start	Term end	Time in office	Notes
1	David Veale	2010	2010	1 year	
2	Neville Box	2011	2015	5 years	
3	Elaine Hazim	2016	2018	3 years	
4	Sue Atzarakis	2019	2025	6 years	
5	Glenn Leyland	2025	incumbent	0–1 years	

The following individuals have served as Junior Campus Principal of Victoria University Secondary College:

- During the initial months of the college merger, the campus principal was called the Deer Park Campus Principal instead of the Junior Campus Principal, as both campuses still served students from Year 7 to Year 12 during the transition.

Ordinal	Campus Principal	Term start	Term end	Time in office	Notes
1	Paul Ryan (Acting)	January 2010	April 2010	1 school term	
2	Elaine Hazim	2010	2015	5 years	
3	Sue Atzarakis	2016	2018	3 years	
4	Glenn Leyland	2019	2025	6 years	
5	Deborah Chapman	2025	incumbent	0–1 years	

The following individuals have served as Brimbank Campus Principal (iCAN, Flexible Learning Program) of Victoria University Secondary College:

- The Brimbank Campus Principal role at Victoria University Secondary College was established in 2024, to provide alternative education and an isolated campus to at risk students.

Ordinal	Principal	Term start	Term end	Time in office	Notes
1	Jason Austin	2024	incumbent	2–3 years	
