= Keilor Park =

- Suburb
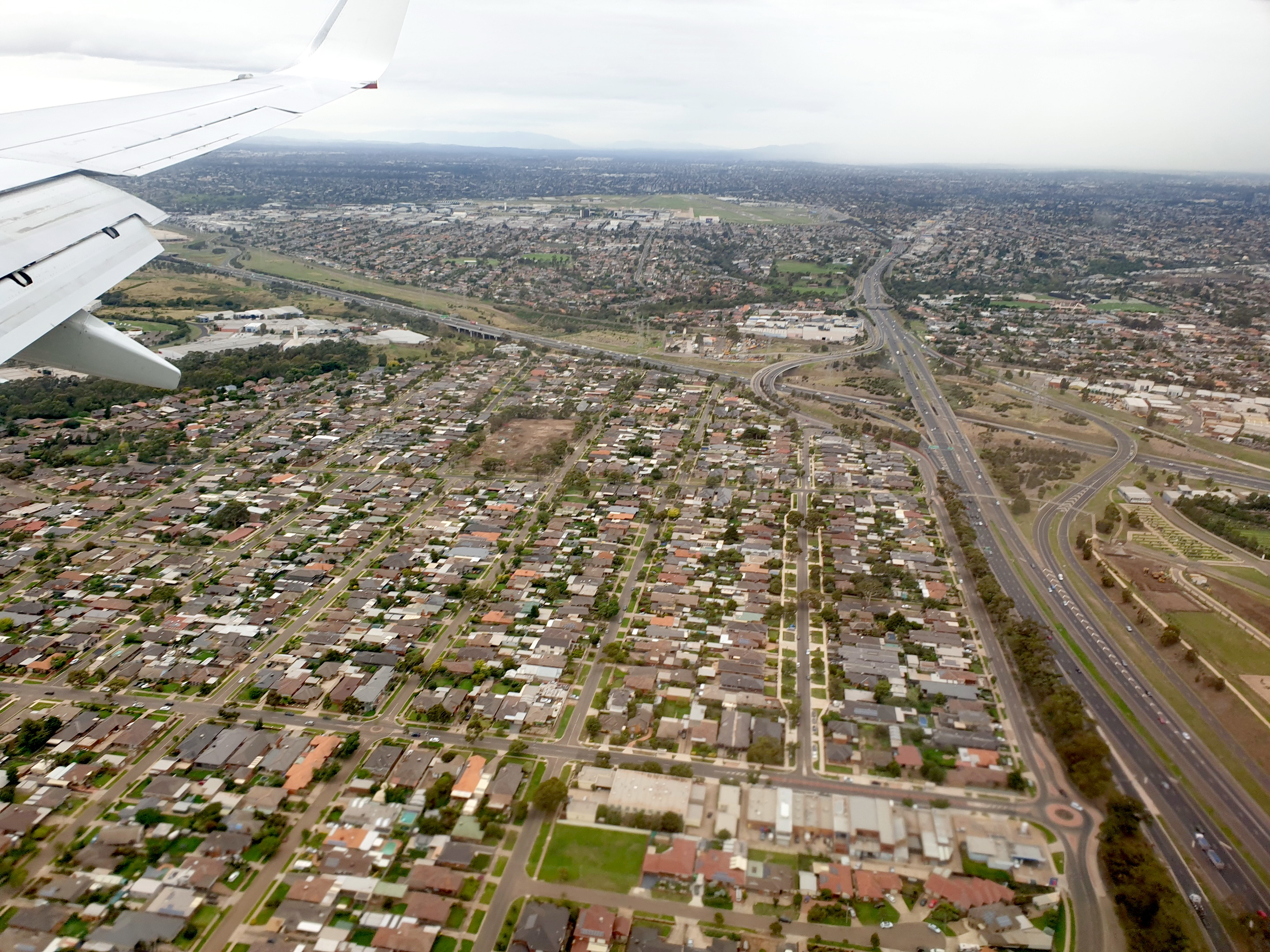
- Aerial view of Keilor Park

- Interactive map of Keilor Park
- Coordinates: 37.719°S 144.851°E
- Country: Australia
- State: Victoria
- City: Melbourne
- LGA: City of Brimbank
- Location: 15 km (9.3 mi) from Melbourne

Government
  - State electorate: Niddrie
  - Federal divisions: Hawke; Maribyrnong

Area
  - Total: 3.3 km^{2} (1.3 sq mi)
- Elevation: 74 m (243 ft)

Population
  - Total: 2,684 (2021 census)
  - Density: 813/km^{2} (2,110/sq mi)
- Postcode: 3042
Suburbs around Keilor Park
Melbourne Airport	Tullamarine	Tullamarine
Keilor	Keilor Park	Airport West
Kealba	Keilor East	Keilor East

Keilor Park is a suburb in Melbourne, Victoria, Australia, 15 km (9.3 mi) north-west of Melbourne's Central Business District, located within the City of Brimbank local government area. Keilor Park recorded a population of 2,684 at the 2021 census.

Keilor Park is bounded in the west by the Maribyrnong River, Tullamarine and Melbourne Airport in the north, in the east by Steele Creek and in the south by the Calder Highway.

According to the 2001 ABS Census, 39% of the population is of Italian or Greek descent. The median age of the area is 37, though more of the population is below 35 or in their 50s. The most common sector of employment for men is manufacturing (25% of men) and for women retail (21% of women).

The suburb contains the Keilor Botanic Gardens.

== History ==
Keilor Park was historically part of the larger Keilor district, which was settled by Europeans in the 1830s. The name 'Keilor' itself is believed to derive from a farm in Scotland named Keillor, owned by the father of early settler James Watson.

The suburb of Keilor Park was officially named and bounded much later, during the rapid residential expansion of the Keilor municipality that began in the 1960s. Its location, adjacent to the Maribyrnong River and Steele Creek, eventually transitioned the area from being predominantly agricultural land to a mixed residential and industrial zone.

=== Heritage listing ===
The following place in Keilor Park is listed on the Victorian Heritage Register:

- Keilor Police Hut, 152 Harrick Road, relocated to this site from Keilor North in c. 2015

== Demographics ==
According to data from the 2016 census:

- The most common ancestries in Keilor Park were Italian 24.8%, Australian 16.1%, English 15.3%, Irish 5.6% and Greek 4.7%.
- In Keilor Park, 62.5% of people were born in Australia. The most common countries of birth were Italy 11.9%, Greece 1.9%, England 1.6%, Malta 1.5% and India 1.3%.
- The most common responses for religion in Keilor Park were Catholic 49.6%, No Religion, so described 17.6%, Eastern Orthodox 7.5%, Not stated 7.5% and Anglican 5.7%. In Keilor Park, Christianity was the largest religious group reported overall (77.1%) (this figure excludes not stated responses).
- In Keilor Park, 60.3% of people only spoke English at home. Other languages spoken at home included Italian 17.2%, Greek 4.1%, Arabic 1.4%, Maltese 1.2% and Spanish 1.0%.

== Sport ==
Keilor Park has a number of ovals and sports located in its area. Sports include cricket, football, softball, athletics, tennis, soccer, basketball.

Keilor Park Football Club, an Australian Rules football team, competes in the Essendon District Football League.

== Transport ==
- 465: Essendon – Keilor Park via Buckley Street, Milleara Shopping Centre, Keilor East (every day). Operated by CDC Melbourne
- 476: Moonee Ponds Junction – Hillside via Essendon station, Keilor, Watergardens Town Centre, Watergardens station (every day). Operated by CDC Melbourne

== See also ==
- City of Keilor – Keilor Park was previously within this former local government area.
