= City of Sunshine =

Coordinates: 37°46′52″S 144°49′55″E

City of Sunshine Victoria
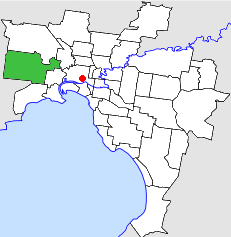
- Location in Melbourne
- The extent of the City of Sunshine at its dissolution in 1994
- Population: 98,000 (1992)
  - Density: 1,224/km^{2} (3,170/sq mi)
- Established: 1860
- Area: 80.06 km^{2} (30.9 sq mi)
- Council seat: Sunshine
- Region: Western Melbourne
- County: Bourke
LGAs around City of Sunshine:
Melton	Keilor	Essendon
Melton	City of Sunshine	Footscray
Werribee	Werribee	Altona

The City of Sunshine was a local government area about 13 kilometres (8 mi) west of Melbourne, the state capital of Victoria, Australia. The city covered an area of 80.05 square kilometres (30.91 sq mi), and existed from 1860 until 1994.

== History ==
The local area was first incorporated as the Braybrook Road District on 28 May 1860. The Braybrook Road District became the Shire of Braybrook on 27 May 1871. In May 1916 and again in February 1951, parts of the shire were annexed to the neighbouring Shire of Melton. The Shire of Braybrook was proclaimed a city on 16 May 1951, and was renamed to the City of Sunshine.

Labor Party candidates were successful in most Sunshine Council elections, although Independent candidates were frequently elected. The only endorsed Australian Democrats candidate to be elected in a municipal election, Joe Cilmi, was successful at the City of Sunshine. Cilmi, aged 21, was elected to the Sunshine City Council in August 1982, although he only held office for one three-year term. The city was managed by a state-appointed commissioner, Alex Gillon, from November 1976 until 1982, after the elected council was sacked by the state government for its financial mismanagement.

On 15 December 1994, the City of Sunshine was abolished; the western part of the city, including Sunshine itself, was merged with parts of the City of Keilor, into the newly created City of Brimbank, with the eastern part merging with the City of Footscray, to form the newly created City of Maribyrnong.

Council met at the City Hall, in Alexandra Avenue, Sunshine. The premises is used today as municipal offices for the City of Brimbank.

Ruth Atkins in her book Albany to Zeehan: a new look at local governments dedicated a chapter to the activities of the City of Sunshine during the period 1972–1976.

== Wards ==
On 1 October 1981, the City of Sunshine was subdivided into four wards:

- North Ward
- South Ward
- River Ward

== Suburbs ==
- Albanvale*
- Albion
- Ardeer
- Braybrook
- Brooklyn
- Cairnlea*
- Deer Park
- Derrimut
- Maidstone
- Maribyrnong
- St Albans (shared with the City of Keilor)
- Sunshine+
- Sunshine North
- Sunshine West
- Tottenham

* Suburbs gazetted since the amalgamation.
+ Council seat.

== Population ==
Year	Population
1954	41,332
1958	53,600*
1961	62,321
1966	69,081
1971	76,427
1976	88,167
1981	94,419
1986	94,413
1991	94,020

* Estimate in the 1958 Victorian Year Book.
