= Brimbank & North West Star Weekly =

Weekly newspaper in Melbourne, Victoria

The Brimbank & North West Star Weekly is a weekly suburban newspaper that serves a broad section of outer western Melbourne suburbs including Sunshine, Braybrook, St Albans, Deer Park and Ardeer. The paper is delivered for free each Tuesday to an estimated circulation of 78,261. The paper also has an online news website that is updated on a daily basis.

== History ==
The paper was originally known as the Sunshine Advocate and commenced publication on 1 March 1924, making it the first registered newspaper in the district. It was founded by Clarence Carlton, who remained the proprietor and editor from 1924 until 1965, when it was acquired by Cumberland Newspapers. In 1995 it became known as the Brimbank Advocate, then finally in September 2010 the connection with the Advocate name ceased when the publication was renamed the Brimbank Weekly.

In January 2015, Fairfax Media, then publisher of the Brimbank Weekly, established a new entity, MMP Star Pty Ltd and merged the title with the competing Star News Group publication the St Albans, Sunshine, Keilor Star and renamed the masthead, Star Weekly. The two newspapers were merged and became known as the Brimbank & North West Star Weekly. In June 2019 MMP Star became wholly owned by Star News Group Pty Ltd related entities.

== See also ==
- List of newspapers in Australia
