= Delahey =

Delahey Melbourne, Victoria
- Coordinates: 37.719°S 144.777°E
- Population: 8,077 (2021 census)
  - Density: 2,244/km^{2} (5,810/sq mi)
- Postcode(s): 3037
- Area: 3.6 km^{2} (1.4 sq mi)
- Location: 20 km (12 mi) from Melbourne
- LGA(s): City of Brimbank
- State electorate(s): Sydenham
- Federal division(s): Gorton
Suburbs around Delahey:
Sydenham	Sydenham	Taylors Lakes
Taylors Hill	Delahey	Keilor Downs
Burnside	Kings Park	St Albans

Delahey is a suburb in Melbourne, Victoria, Australia, 20 km (12 mi) north-west of Melbourne's Central Business District, located within the City of Brimbank local government area. At the 2021 census, Delahey recorded a population of 8,077.

== History ==
Delahey originally contained several farming properties. The Government acquired the land in the mid-to-late 1980s for re-subdivision as mostly residential properties. The suburb is named after William Delahey, who whilst still a baby, had arrived from Ireland with his parents and siblings Henry Delahey and Mary (née Dodd) in June 1840. William Delahey had been connected with the Keilor Shire Council for 18 years and was elected president for 1882–83. The suburb's name was formally adopted in 1994.

Delahey is the home of the transmitter for the major Melbourne station of the Australian Broadcasting Corporation, 774 ABC Melbourne, with its 215-metre (705 ft) high-guyed transmitter mast.

== Facilities ==
=== Education ===
- MacKellar Primary School
- Copperfield College – Senior Campus

== See also ==
- City of Keilor – Delahey was previously within this former local government area.
