= Keilor Lodge =

- Suburb
- Coordinates: 37.694°S 144.790°E
- Country: Australia
- State: Victoria
- City: Melbourne
- LGA: City of Brimbank
- Location: 19 km (12 mi) from Melbourne

Government
  - State electorate: Sydenham
  - Federal division: Gorton
- Elevation: 91 m (299 ft)

Population
  - Total: 1,668 (2021 census)
- Postcode: 3038
Suburbs around Keilor Lodge
Taylors Lakes	Keilor North	Keilor North
Taylors Lakes	Keilor Lodge	Keilor
Taylors Lakes	Taylors Lakes	Keilor

Keilor Lodge is a suburb in Melbourne, Victoria, Australia, 19 km (12 mi) north-west of Melbourne's Central Business District, located within the City of Brimbank local government area. Keilor Lodge recorded a population of 1,668 at the 2021 census.

Keilor Lodge is bounded by Keilor North to the north, Keilor to the east and Taylors Lakes to the south and west.

== See also ==
- City of Keilor – Keilor Lodge was previously within this former local government area.
