= St Albans Secondary College =

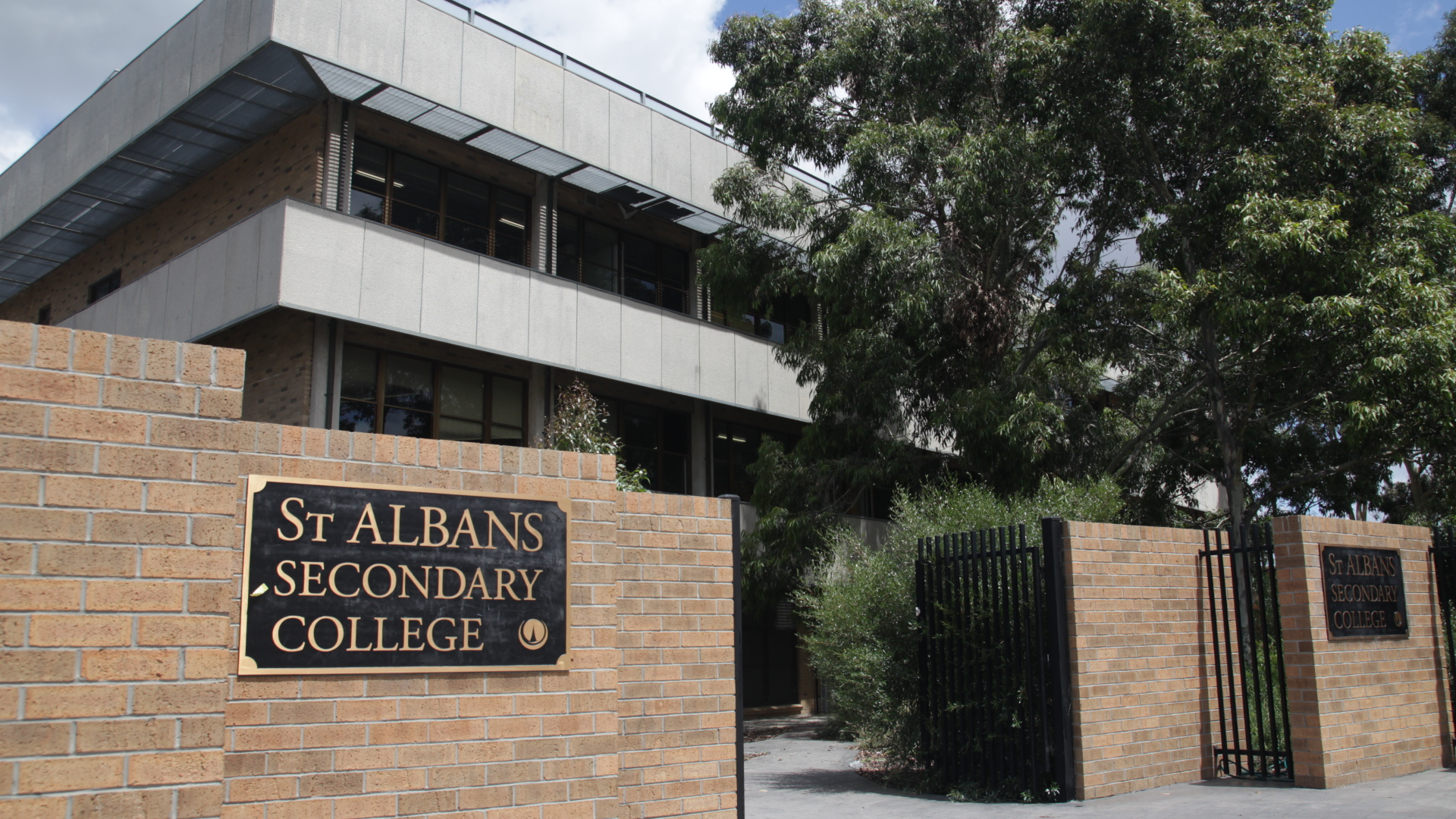
- St Albans Secondary College, in 2011

Location
- St Albans, Melbourne, Victoria; Australia; 37°44′42″S 144°48′30″E

Information
- Type: Public high school
- Established: 1956; 70 years ago
- Principal: Craig Jennings
- Years: 7–12
- Colours: Maroon, black & white
- Website: www.stalbanssc.vic.edu.au

St Albans Secondary College is a public coeducational secondary school located in the Melbourne suburb of St Albans, Victoria, Australia. It is administered by the Victorian Department of Education, with an enrolment of 1,636 students and a teaching staff of 148, as of 2023. The school caters for students from Year 7 to Year 12.

== History ==
The school was established in 1956.

Kerrie Dowsley served as college principal from 2007 until her retirement in 2023. Craig Jennings is currently serving as principal of the college.

== See also ==
- List of government schools in Victoria, Australia
