= Brimbank Park =

Park in Melbourne, Australia

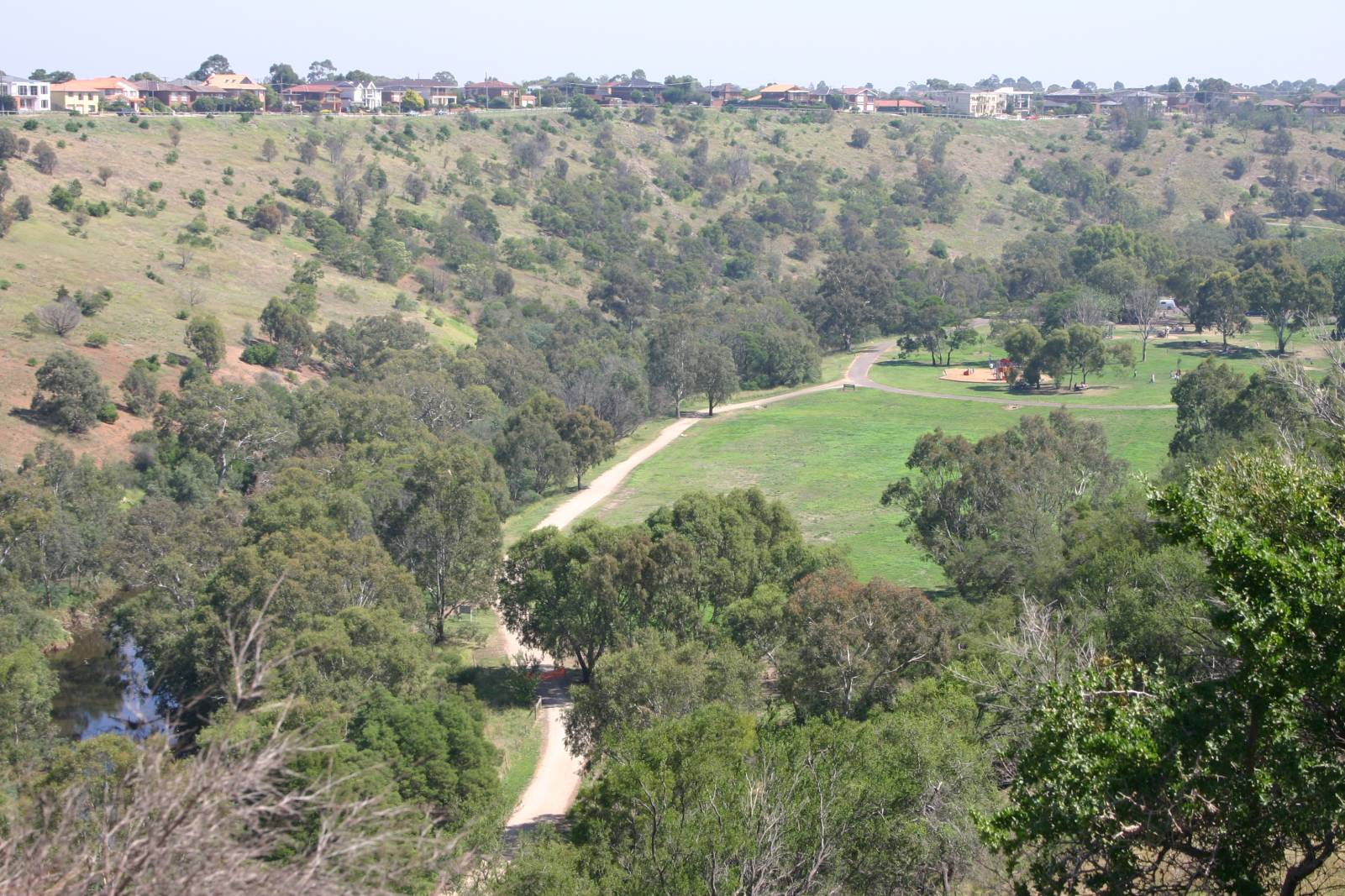
- The park and adjacent Maribyrnong River

- Location within Melbourne
- Interactive map of Brimbank Park
- Type: Metropolitan park
- Location: Keilor East, Melbourne, Victoria, Australia
- Coordinates: 37°44′02″S 144°50′13″E
- Area: 328.7 ha (812 acres)
- Established: 1976; 50 years ago
- Operator: Parks Victoria
- Open: Daily, from 6:00am to 5:30pm
- Status: Open
- Paths: 10 km (6.2 mi), sealed and unsealed
- Water: Maribyrnong River
- Plants: Red River Gums
- Species: Galahs; parrots; wetland birds; birds of prey; brushtail and ringtail possums; wallabies; bats; reptiles
- Public transit: – St Albans + walk; –; – Maribyrnong River Trail
- Facilities: Barbecues; cafe; playgrounds; shelters and picnic tables; toilets; wetlands
- Website: parks.vic.gov.au

Brimbank Park is a 328-hectare (811-acre) metropolitan park located in Keilor East, a north-western suburb of Melbourne, in Victoria, Australia. Established in 1976 on the banks of the Maribyrnong River, approximately 15 kilometres (9.3 mi) north–west of the Melbourne city centre, the park is managed by Parks Victoria.

The park is located on the traditional lands of the Wurundjeri Woi-wurrung.

== History ==
About 40,000 years ago: first signs of possible human habitation along the Maribyrnong River. The Keilor Cranium and femur of a person, found in 1940 in a sand bank, has been carbon dated at about 12,000 years.

In the late 1830s, Europeans first settled the area and used the fertile river valley as stock runs. They often drove stock around the brim of the bank, thus the park's name, Brimbank. The river flats on the east bank were used for market gardening until 1983.

In 1976, Brimbank Park opened to the public as part of the Maribyrnong Valley Park, combined with the adjacent Horseshoe Bend Children's farm and Greenvale Reservoir Park. The Maribyrnong River has hollowed out a valley some 55 metres (180 ft) below the Keilor Plain, with a steep bank on the northern side and gentle terraces on the southern side.

In 2016, the park was implemented a Victorian-first pilot project to help children on the autism spectrum play more freely, with Parks Victoria creating a digital "script" showing items and sights they would encounter at the park. This was designed to alleviate anxiety, particularly when moving from one place to another, and was designed alongside autism advocacy organisation Amaze.

In 2021, Parks Victoria began helping plant trees at the park as part of the "More Trees for a Cooler, Greener West" project which aims to plant trees in urban areas of Melbourne's western suburbs with the lowest tree canopy covers. This was done to help increase urban shade cover with phase two commencing in 2022 and stage three completed by mid-2023.

== Features ==
The park fields recreational activities with facilities including walking and cycling tracks, playgrounds, picnic areas, amenities and a café. In addition to accessing via public transport, the park is located near the junction of the Calder Freeway and Western Ring Road, via either the Old Calder Highway or Keilor Park Drive.

The Maribyrnong River flows through the park, which is the north-west terminus of the Maribyrnong River Trail, with the other terminus in Footscray, 25 kilometres (16 mi) to the south-east. At Keilor, the river winds back on itself in a horseshoe bend, before winding south again at Brimbank Park.

Brimbank Park is home to wildlife including swamp wallabies, blue tongued lizards and echidnas. Birds including parrots, herons, galahs, blue wrens, yellow-tailed thornbills, rosellas, flame robins and the peregrine falcon can also be seen in the park.

In 2025, the site hosted a regular 5-kilometre (3 mi) parkrun.

== See also ==
- Parks and gardens of Melbourne
