= Calder Park, Victoria =

Calder Park
- Suburb
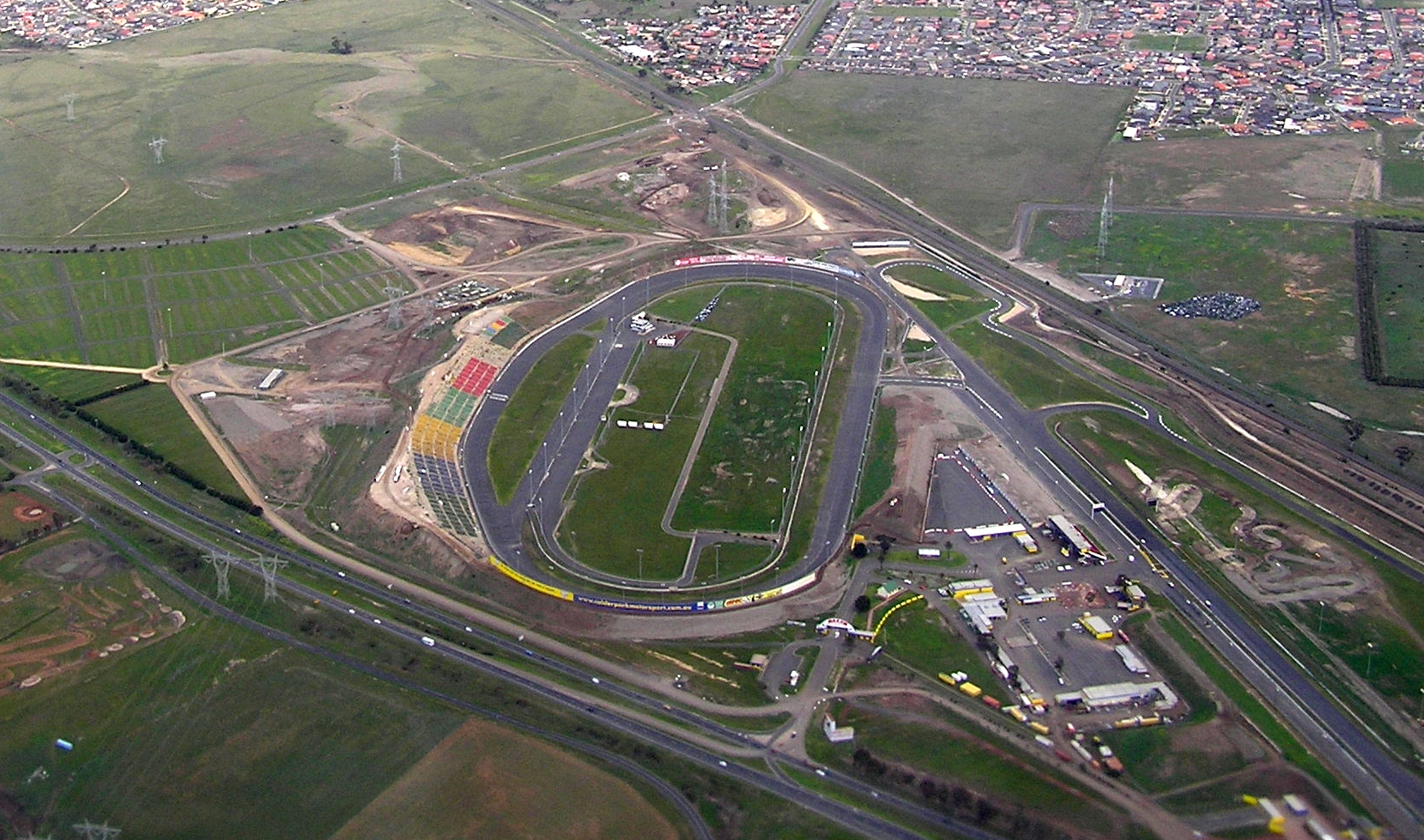
- Aerial view of Calder Park Raceway

- Coordinates: 37.679°S 144.762°E
- Country: Australia
- State: Victoria
- City: Melbourne
- LGA: City of Brimbank
- Location: 23 km (14 mi) from Melbourne

Government
  - State electorate: Sydenham
  - Federal division: Gorton

Population
  - Total: 0 (2021 census)
- Postcode: 3037
Suburbs around Calder Park
| Diggers Rest | Keilor North | Bulla |
| Plumpton | Calder Park | Keilor North |
| Hillside | Sydenham | Taylors Lakes |

Calder Park is a suburb in Melbourne, Victoria, Australia, 23 km (14 mi) north-west of Melbourne's Central Business District, located within the City of Brimbank local government area. Calder Park recorded no population at the 2021 census.

Wedged between the Calder Freeway and the Bendigo railway line, Calder Park has no residential dwellings within its bounds, with the chapel being the only structure, situated adjacent to the Calder Park Raceway. This is located in the northern half of the suburb, with the southern half comprising open fields and the adjoining Taylors Lakes.

The land located between the raceway and Taylors Lakes is zoned for future industrial use and is shown in some maps as a future industrial estate. The development type is restricted due to its proximity to Melbourne Airport and its planned future second runway project.

== See also ==
- City of Keilor – Calder Park was previously within this former local government area.
