= Taylors Hill, Victoria =

Taylors Hill
- Suburb
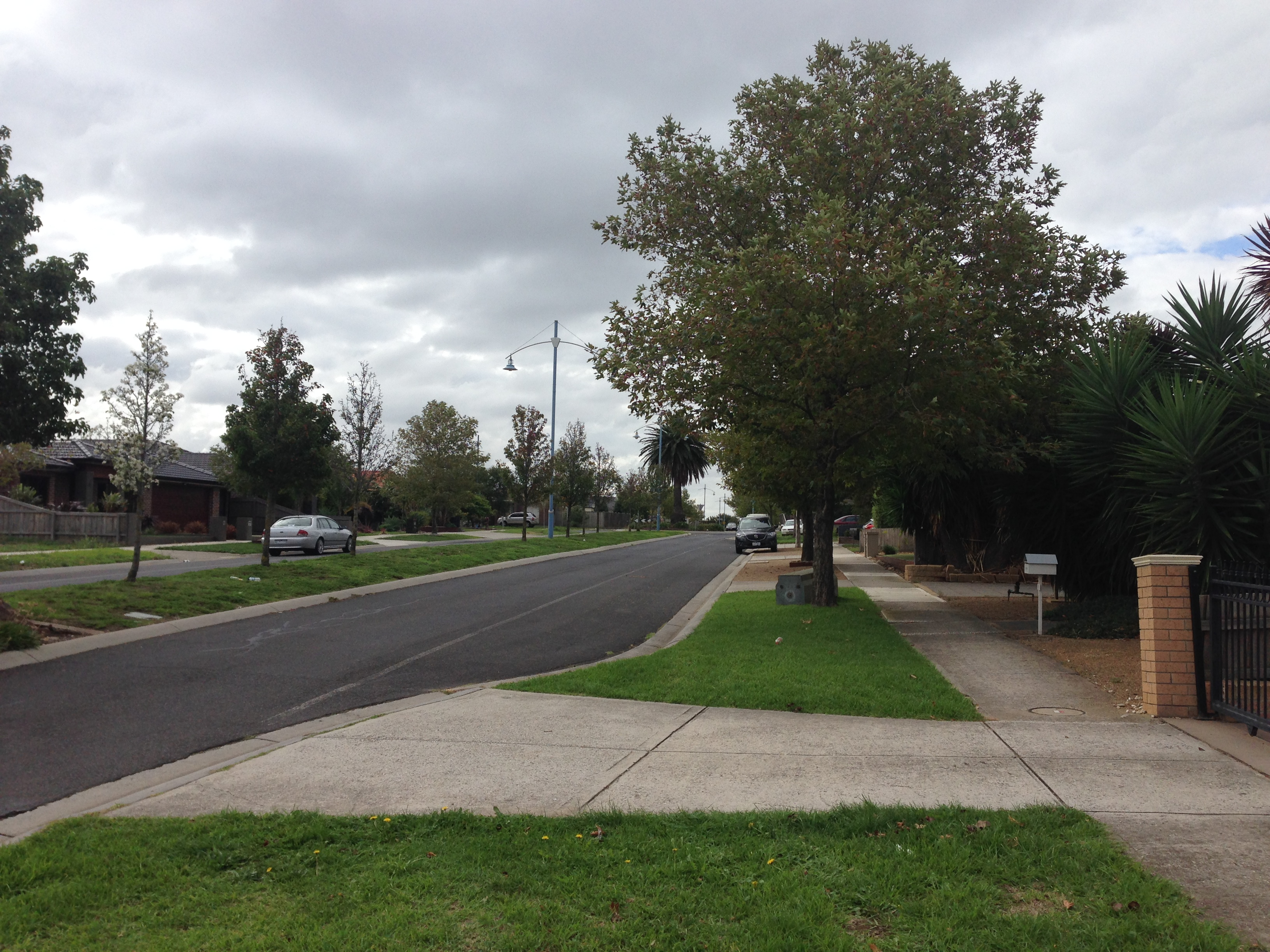
- Collins Street, Taylors Hill

- Interactive map of Taylors Hill
- Coordinates: 37.715°S 144.751°E
- Country: Australia
- State: Victoria
- City: Melbourne
- LGA: City of Melton
- Location: 22 km (14 mi) from Melbourne

Government
  - State electorate: Sydenham
  - Federal division: Gorton

Area
  - Total: 4.5 km^{2} (1.7 sq mi)

Population
  - Total: 19,539 (2021 census)
  - Density: 4,340/km^{2} (11,250/sq mi)
- Postcode: 3037
Suburbs around Taylors Hill
Hillside	Taylors Lakes	Sydenham
Caroline Springs	Taylors Hill	Delahey
Caroline Springs	Burnside	Kings Park

Taylors Hill is a suburb in Melbourne, Victoria, Australia, 22 km (14 mi) north-west of Melbourne's Central Business District, located within the City of Melton local government area. Taylors Hill recorded a population of 19,539 at the 2021 census.

Taylors Hill, as well as the nearby Taylors Lakes and Taylors Road, is named after Scottish settler and later politician William Taylor. In 1849, Taylor purchased the Overnewton pastoral estate on which Taylors Hill today sits. The land was subdivided and transformed into two master planned housing estates; Watervale and Taylors Hill, in the early 2000s. It features large housing blocks, parks, walking trails, playgrounds, and lakes.

The boundaries are Gourlay Road to the west and Taylors Road to the south, while the eastern limit aligns with Overton Lea Boulevard and the northern limit aligns Chervil Close and Hume Drive.

== Transport ==
Taylors hill is serviced by the nearby Keilor Plains and Watergardens train stations, as well as five bus routes:

- 418 : St Albans Station – Caroline Springs via Keilor Plains Station. Operated by CDC Melbourne.
- 460 : Watergardens Station – Caroline Springs Station via Caroline Springs Town Centre. Operated by CDC Melbourne.
- 462 : Watergardens Station – Caroline Springs Station via Caroline Springs Square SC. Operated by CDC Melbourne.
- 464 : Watergardens Station – Rockbank Station via Taylors Road. Operated by CDC Melbourne.
- Night Bus 943 : Watergardens Station – Melton via Caroline Springs (operates Friday and Saturday nights only). Operated by Transit Systems Victoria.
