= St Albans, Victoria =

St Albans
- Suburb
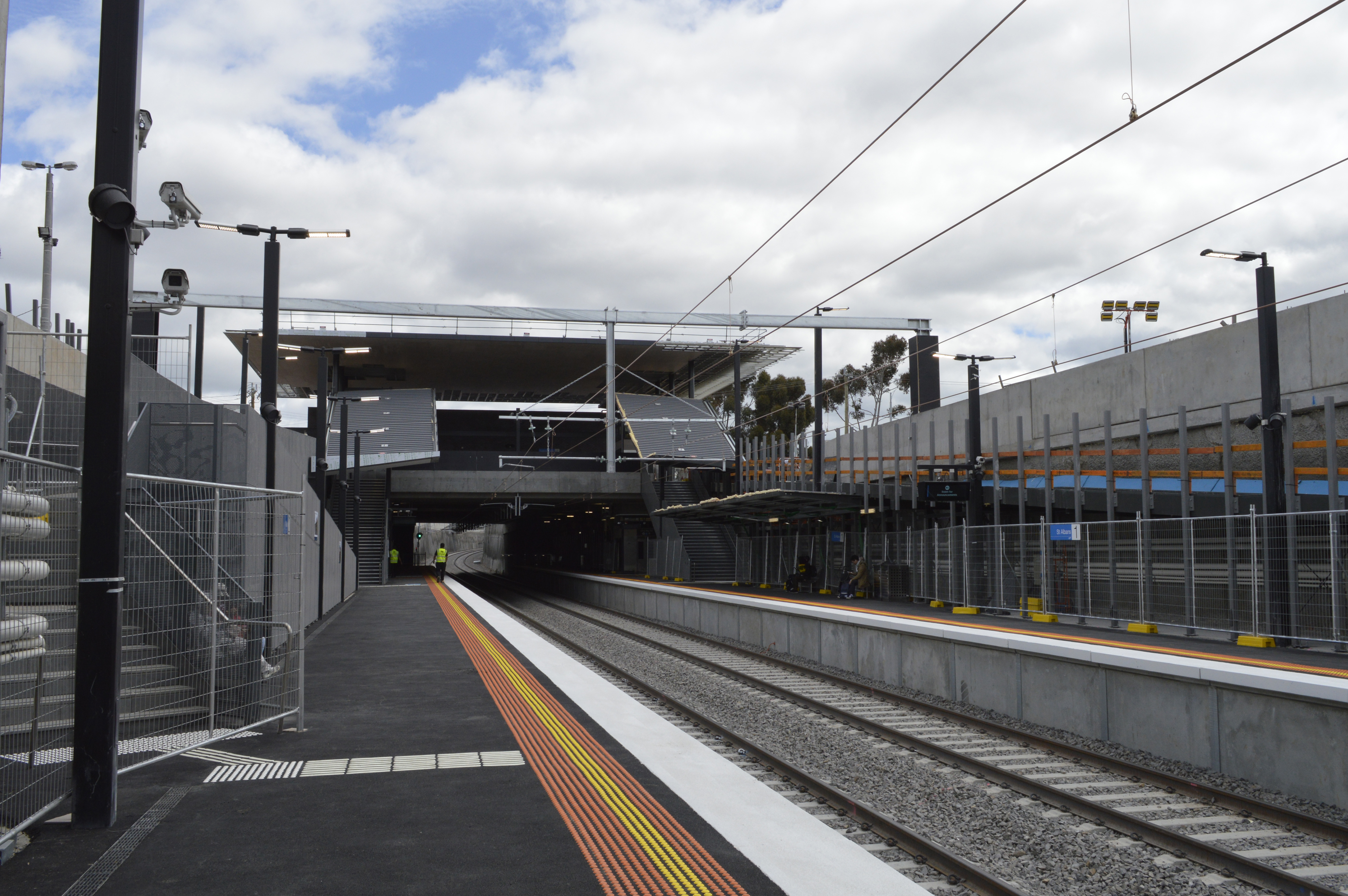
- St Albans railway station

- Interactive map of St Albans
- Coordinates: 37°44′10″S 144°48′14″E
- Country: Australia
- State: Victoria
- City: Melbourne
- LGA: City of Brimbank
- Location: 17 km (11 mi) from Melbourne
- Established: 1887

Government
  - State electorate: St Albans
  - Federal division: Fraser

Area
  - Total: 13 km^{2} (5.0 sq mi)
- Elevation: 71 m (233 ft)

Population
  - Total: 38,042 (2021 census)
  - Density: 2,930/km^{2} (7,580/sq mi)
- Postcode: 3021
Suburbs around St Albans
Delahey	Keilor Downs	Keilor Downs
Kings Park	St Albans	Kealba
Albanvale	Cairnlea, Ardeer	Albion, Sunshine North

St Albans (/sɪnt ˈɔːlbənz/) is a suburb in Melbourne, Victoria, Australia, 17 km (11 mi) north-west of Melbourne's central business district, located within the City of Brimbank local government area. In the 2021 census, St Albans recorded a population of 38,042.

St Albans' main commercial and shopping precinct is located on Main Road West, Main Road East, Alfrieda Street, the railway station and East Esplanade. The postcode is 3021.

== History ==
St Albans was first established as a township in 1887 and originally subdivided by the Cosmopolitan Land and Banking Company, who had acquired 512 hectares (5.12 km^{2}) in the hope of a quick financial gain during that period's land boom. Manager Alfred Padley made an arrangement with Victorian Railways to build the railway station, which he insisted be named St Albans after his maternal ancestors' association with St Albans Cathedral, England. Padley built and resided in Kieglo, which later became the Presbytery of the Sacred Heart. The company was later liquidated in 1903.

St Albans was promoted as an attractive location for professionals, providing easy rail access to central Melbourne and adjoining suburbs. St Albans Post Office opened on 22 October 1888.

St Albans became a small dormitory suburb for growing industrial firms in Deer Park and Sunshine. Despite the Great Depression, development was steady and, by 1940, around 700 people lived in the town. In the years following World War II, the population rapidly increased with the arrival of displaced migrants, particularly from Yugoslavia, Malta and Italy. This led to additional state schools and the 1953 establishment of Sacred Heart Catholic Church, as well as Greek, Russian and Serbian Orthodox churches.

St Albans remained geographically isolated from other suburbs by large areas of open land until the 1980s. It is now considered to be a middle-city suburb as the Melbourne metropolitan area boundary now extends to over 35 km (22 mi) from the Melbourne CBD.

== Demographics ==
In the 2021 census, St Albans recorded a population of 38,042, 49.7% female and 50.3% male. The median age of the St Albans population was 36 years, 2 years below the national median of 38. 32.5% of people living in St Albans were born in Australia. The other top responses for country of birth were Vietnam 21.5%, India 5.8%, the Philippines 3.0%, Malta 2.7% and Iraq 1.4%. The most spoken language in St Albans is Vietnamese at 29.2% of the suburb's population; the next most common languages were 21.6% English, 4.2% Punjabi, 2.7% Maltese, 2.4% Cantonese and 2.1% Arabic.

In the 2016 census, St Albans recorded a population of 37,309, 49.6% female and 50.4% male. The median age of the St Albans population was 35 years, 3 years below the national median of 38. 32.6% of people living in St Albans were born in Australia. The other top responses for country of birth were Vietnam 17.8%, India 7.3%, Malta 3.2%, the Philippines 2.7% and New Zealand 1.9%. The most spoken language was Vietnamese, at 25.3% of the suburb's population; the next most common languages were 22.7% English, 5.7% Punjabi, 3.4% Maltese, 2.5% Cantonese and 2.3% Greek.

== Transport ==
=== Trains ===
St Albans has three train stations, all in PTV ticketing Zone 2 on the Sunbury line. These are Ginifer, St Albans and Keilor Plains.

The line was electrified as far as St Albans until 26 January 2002 when it was extended to Sydenham. The Sydenham line was electrified to Sunbury and renamed the Sunbury railway line, opening on 18 November 2012.

The level crossing at St Albans station was removed in 2016, with the station lowered and the level crossing replaced with a new overpass.

=== Buses ===
St Albans has numerous bus services that service St Albans itself and neighbouring suburbs, most of which start and finish at St Albans railway station.

=== Cycling ===
Cyclists in St Albans are represented by BrimBUG, the Brimbank Bicycle User Group.

== Flora and fauna ==
Great parks are located on the East and West borders of the suburb. These areas (particularly in the West) used to have large healthy populations of native reptiles, including tiger snake, eastern blue-tongued lizard and eastern brown snake. Unfortunately due to development these species are now rarely seen in the area.

Due to development of the Cairnlea estate on the southern border of St Albans, native species of frogs have taken advantage and have taken up residence in the new wetlands and lakes. The Eastern Banjo Frog, common eastern froglet and even the now endangered growling grass frog have been seen and heard in the new wetlands and around Kororoit Creek.

- Brimbank Park
- Kororoit Creek Trail

== Education ==
St Albans has a large number of schools including the following;

- Victoria University, Australia
- Victoria University Secondary College
- Catholic Regional College St Albans
- Holy Eucharist Primary School
- St Albans Secondary College
- St Albans Primary School (established 1889)
- St Albans Heights Primary School
- St Albans East Primary School
- St Albans Meadows Primary School
- University Park Primary School (formerly St Albans South Primary School)
- St Albans North Primary School
- Sacred Heart Primary School
- Stevensville Primary School
- Movelle Primary School
- Jackson School

== Community facilities ==
The suburb and surrounding areas have a large Orthodox Christian community. The suburb is home to the Greek Orthodox Church of St Paraskevi, St Barbara and St John the Merciful, the Serbian Orthodox Church of St George, and also the Coptic Orthodox Church of St George.

Thien Duc Temple, Dieu Am Temple and Bo De Temple, three Vietnamese Buddhist temples, are located in the suburb.

== Sport ==
The suburb has an Australian Rules football team, St Albans Football Club, competing in the Western Region Football League, with the club actually based in neighbouring Kings Park. The club has been very successful particularly over recent years.

The local soccer team, the St Albans Saints is backed by the Croatian community, whilst the Green Gully Cavaliers are backed by the Maltese community. Both currently compete in the Victorian Premier League and both have significant support.

== See also ==
- City of Keilor – Parts of St Albans were previously within this former local government area.
- City of Sunshine – Parts of St Albans were previously within this former local government area.
- History of St Albans web site – a web site maintained by local historians that is still a work in progress
- St Albans railway station, Melbourne
