= Copperfield College =

Coordinates: 37°43′08″S 144°46′19.6″E

Copperfield College is a school located in the Western Suburbs of Melbourne, Victoria, Australia.

A college with three campuses, Copperfield College has two junior campuses catering for students Years 7—10 in Kings Park and Sydenham, and one senior campus for students in Years 11 and 12, located at Delahey.

== History ==
The school’s original campus on Gillespie Road in St Albans West, Kings Park High School (also: Kings Park Secondary College), which opened in January 1979 and closed December 1992, to become Copperfield College. The Delahey campus was established in 1993. Copperfield College’s newest Sydenham campus was established in 2001.

Nick Adamou is currently serving as College Principal.

== International links ==
Since 1996, Copperfield College has had a relationship with their sister school, Fuji Junior High School, in Fuji City, Shizouka Prefecture, Japan. The schools maintain a close relationship through their exchange program. Study tours occur every second year and the College hosts students and staff from Fuji Junior High School in alternate years.

== School mission ==
Copperfield College’s school mission is: Empowering Every Student to Aspire and Achieve.

The school’s values are Respect (valuing ourselves, others and our environment), Responsibility (taking ownership of our actions and learning), Relationships (building positive, inclusive and supportive connections), and Excellence (striving for continuous improvement and the highest standards in all we do).

== School curriculum ==
Students at Copperfield College have opportunities in sport, the arts, leadership programs, public speaking, debating, environmental initiatives, and instrumental music and extracurricular programs.

== Notable alumni ==
- Jacob Cassar, boxing Silver Medallist at Commonwealth Games 2026 Glasgow
- Yen Siow, Work: Co-Director for Opening Universities for Refugees; Humanitarian Ambassador; Founder of Social Enterprise “Discovering without Borders”
- Professor Vasso Apostolopolous, Professor of Immunology, Vice-Chancellors Distinguished Fellow, Director Healthy Lifespan and Chronic Diseases Program; School of Health and Biomedical Sciences, University of Melbourne
- Jesse Eilers, Australian The Voice Contestant 2019
- Merhdad Tarash, Commonwealth Games 2010 wrestling finalist
