= Plumpton, Victoria =

Plumpton
- Suburb
- Interactive map of Plumpton
- Coordinates: 37°41′17″S 144°40′05″E
- Country: Australia
- State: Victoria
- LGA: City of Melton
- Location: 30 km (19 mi) from Melbourne; 11 km (6.8 mi) from Melton

Government
  - State electorates: Kororoit; Sydenham
  - Federal division: Hawke

Population
  - Total: 79 (2021 census)
- Postcode: 3335
Suburbs around Plumpton
Toolern Vale	Diggers Rest	Diggers Rest, Calder Park
Melton	Plumpton	Calder Park, Hillside
Grangefields	Bonnie Brook, Fraser Rise	Hillside

Plumpton is a suburb in Melbourne, Victoria, Australia, 30 km (19 mi) north-west of Melbourne's Central Business District, located within the City of Melton local government area. Plumpton recorded a population of 79 at the 2021 census.

== History ==
The land on which Plumpton is located was inhabited by people of the Wathaurong nation, part of the Kulin alliance, for at least 25,000 years before European settlement.

Throughout the 2010s, the Victorian Planning Authority (VPA) and its predecessor agencies worked on documents to prepare the area for development. In February 2018, the Plumpton Precinct Structure Plan and associated supporting documents were approved by the Victorian Minister for Planning.

When fully developed, it is planned to accommodate over 12,000 jobs and support a residential community of around 29,900 people.
