= Keilor Downs =

Keilor Downs Melbourne, Victoria
- Coordinates: 37.722°S 144.803°E
- Population: 9,857 (2021 census)
  - Density: 2,097/km^{2} (5,430/sq mi)
- Postcode(s): 3038
- Elevation: 84 m (276 ft)
- Area: 4.7 km^{2} (1.8 sq mi)
- Location: 18 km (11 mi) from Melbourne
- LGA(s): City of Brimbank
- State electorate(s): St Albans
- Federal division(s): Gorton
Suburbs around Keilor Downs:
Sydenham	Taylors Lakes	Keilor
Delahey	Keilor Downs	Keilor
St Albans	St Albans	Kealba

Keilor Downs is a suburb in Melbourne, Victoria, Australia, 18 km (11 mi) north-west of Melbourne's Central Business District, located within the City of Brimbank local government area. Keilor Downs recorded a population of 9,857 at the 2021 census.

== History ==
Keilor Downs Post Office opened on 14 May 1990 as the suburb developed.

Keilor Downs is believed to have once had a large Aboriginal settlement which dissipated after European settlement. See the entry for Keilor for history pertaining to the Keilor Downs and Keilor Plains region.

== Today ==
The suburb's main shopping centre is Keilor Central, previously known as Centro Keilor prior to 2013. The suburb is home to the Brimbank Leisure Centre (gym, indoor/outdoor pools, etc.), Keilor Downs Police Station and a community centre. There are also several schools, child care centres, churches and parks in the area.

== Sport and recreation ==
The local football teams are Green Gully Cavaliers who play in the Victorian Premier League, Keilor Wolves who compete in Men's Metropolitan League North-West and Keilor Park SC who play in Men's State League Div 3 North-West.

The Green Gully Reserve area is a former tip site turned into a nature reserve. Since 2011 the reserve has had over 9,000 seedlings planted to reforest the area. There are multiple areas in the reserve including walking-cycling tracks, and an off leash dog area, and a playground. Also in the reserve is a stadium which has a capacity of 10,000 and is the home of Green Gully SC. There are 7 additional soccer grounds in total. There is also a tennis club.

== Public transport ==
The nearest railway station is Keilor Plains. Typically it takes around 27 minutes for a train trip to the CBD.

The bus routes through Keilor Downs are the 421 and the 419, which both depart from St Albans station and terminate at Watergardens station in Taylors Lakes.

=== Schools in Keilor Downs ===
- Mary MacKillop Primary School
- Monmia Primary School
- Keilor Views Primary School
- Keilor Downs College

== See also ==
- City of Keilor – Keilor Downs was previously within this former local government area.
