= City of Brimbank =

Coordinates: 37°45′S 144°48′E

- Local government area
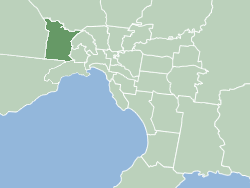
- Map of Melbourne showing City of Brimbank

- Interactive map of City of Brimbank
- Country: Australia
- State: Victoria
- Region: Greater Melbourne
- Established: 15 December 1994
- Council seat: Sunshine

Government
  - Mayor: Ranka Rasic (Labor)
  - State electorate: *Kororoit; Laverton; Niddrie; St Albans; Sunbury; Sydenham
  - Federal divisions: Fraser; Gorton; Hawke; Maribyrnong

Area
  - Total: 123 km^{2} (47 sq mi)

Population
  - Total: 196,046 (2023) (25th)
  - Density: 1,594/km^{2} (4,128/sq mi)
- Website: City of Brimbank
LGAs around City of Brimbank
Hume	Hume	Merri-bek
Melton	City of Brimbank	Moonee Valley, Maribyrnong
Wyndham	Wyndham	Hobsons Bay

The City of Brimbank is a local government area located within the metropolitan area of Melbourne, Victoria, Australia. It is located 10 kilometres west of the Melbourne city centre and is the gateway to Melbourne’s western suburbs.

The city has an area of 123 km² and in 2021, Brimbank had a population of 194,618.

With more than half of its residents born overseas and more than 160 languages spoken, Brimbank is one of Australia’s most multiculturally diverse municipalities.

== History ==
The Wurundjeri people have been the custodians of the land in the Port Phillip Bay region, including the current City of Brimbank, for over 40,000 years before European settlement. Brimbank lies within the area occupied by the Kurung-Jang-Balluk and Marin-Balluk clans of the Wurundjeri people (also known as the Woiwurrung language group) who form part of the larger Kulin Nation. Other groups who occupied land in the area include the Yalukit-Willam and Marpeang-Bulluk clans.

Brimbank was founded on 15 December 1994 during the amalgamations of local councils by the state government. It was formed from the merger of the western portions of the former Cities of Keilor and Sunshine. It was named after Brimbank Park in Keilor, which itself was named for the practice of local farmers driving livestock "around the brim of the bank" of the Maribyrnong River.

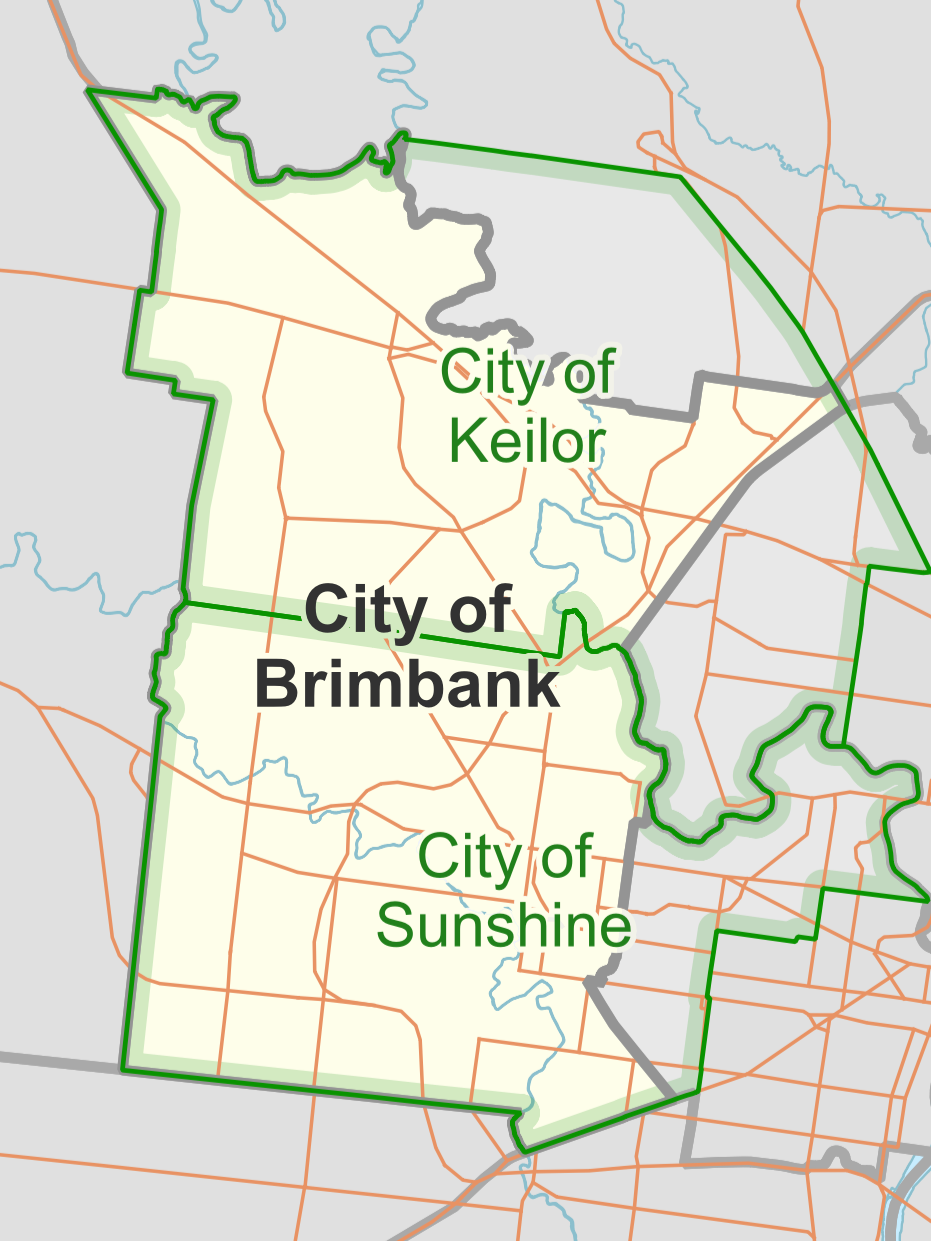
The City of Brimbank's predecessor LGAs (green) as they were in 1994

The municipality has thirteen places listed on the Victorian Heritage Register.

=== Misconduct investigations and dismissal ===
In 2008 and 2009, the Brimbank City Council was the subject of several investigations into alleged misconduct by councillors.

On 30 July 2008, the state MP for Keilor, George Seitz, invoked parliamentary privilege in the Legislative Assembly to accuse former Brimbank mayor Cr Natalie Suleyman of branch stacking, describing her as the "Robert Mugabe of Brimbank". Seitz alleged that Suleyman had 'retaliated' by directing Council to block funding for capital works projects after she was defeated in Labor Party preselection for the 2008 Kororoit state by-election. Following disclosures made under the Whistleblowers Protection Act 2001, the Victorian Ombudsman, George Brouwer, commenced an investigation into the Council in September.

Brouwer's report was presented to Parliament on 7 May 2009, and found councillors were "generally dysfunctional", "lacked awareness of their role", and were "influenced" by unelected third parties. The report asserted that between 2005 and 2008, decisions were reached by a majority (or 'ruling') faction of councillors who would vote on decisions as a bloc. Of the 6 members of the 'ruling faction', only two were re-elected to council in 2008.

The report concluded that:

- External parties, including state MPs George Seitz and Theo Theophanous, and former federal MP Andrew Theophanous, had unduly influenced council business,
- The 'ruling faction' "did not exercise reasonable care" in directing Brimbank CEO Marilyn Duncan to remove funding for the Keilor Lodge Reserve project,
- The 'ruling faction' intended to "worry" Seitz by calling for expressions of interest on the Keilor Lodge Reserve site,
- Cr Suleyman acted "with inappropriate partiality" in prioritising works at Cairnlea Park in the Council's 2008–09 budget,
- Cr Eriksson contravened the Council's Code of Governance by releasing confidential information to the Sunshine Advocate, Brimbank Leader and Brimbank Star newspapers,
- The Labor Party had appeared to breach the Electoral Act by distributing prohibited material to Cr Capar,
- Councillors had misused council-owned laptops and BlackBerry devices,
- Council had failed to handle the severance package of outgoing CEO Marilyn Duncan "in an open and transparent manner",
- The 'ruling faction' had determined the election of mayor until 2013, and
- Local Government Victoria had failed to adequately deal with complaints from residents about Council decision-making.

In response to the Brouwer report, the Minister for Local Government, Richard Wynne, appointed William Scales to closely monitor the council over a three-month period. In his second report Scales found that, despite being closely monitored, there remained widespread misconduct amongst councillors, and recommended that councillors should be suspended or dismissed from their positions. David Walker, a former police detective, was also appointed to investigate possible breaches of the Local Government Act.

On 15 September, Wynne announced that Council would be dismissed, with administrators appointed until November 2012. On 17 November, the Victorian Government appointed Peter Lewinsky, Joanne Anderson and Meredith Sussex as administrators for a three-year period. Investigations into the conduct of Seitz, along with councillors Suleyman, Kathryn Eriksson and Troy Atanasovski, concluded in December with the Local Government Inspectorate informing those involved that it would take no further action.

In May 2012, the Victorian Government announced it would extend the tenure of administrators for a further three years, with Lewinsky reappointed alongside John Watson and former Brimbank commissioner Jane Nathan.

In October 2016, council elections were held in Brimbank for the first time in eight years. Two former councillors were re-elected: Sam David and Margaret Giudice, the latter having rescinded her Labor Party membership in 2014.

== Wards and councillors ==
City of Brimbank Council

Leadership
- Mayor: Bruce Lancashire

Structure
- Council political groups: Ind. Labor (5); Independent (4); Greens (1); Ind. Liberal (1)

Meeting place
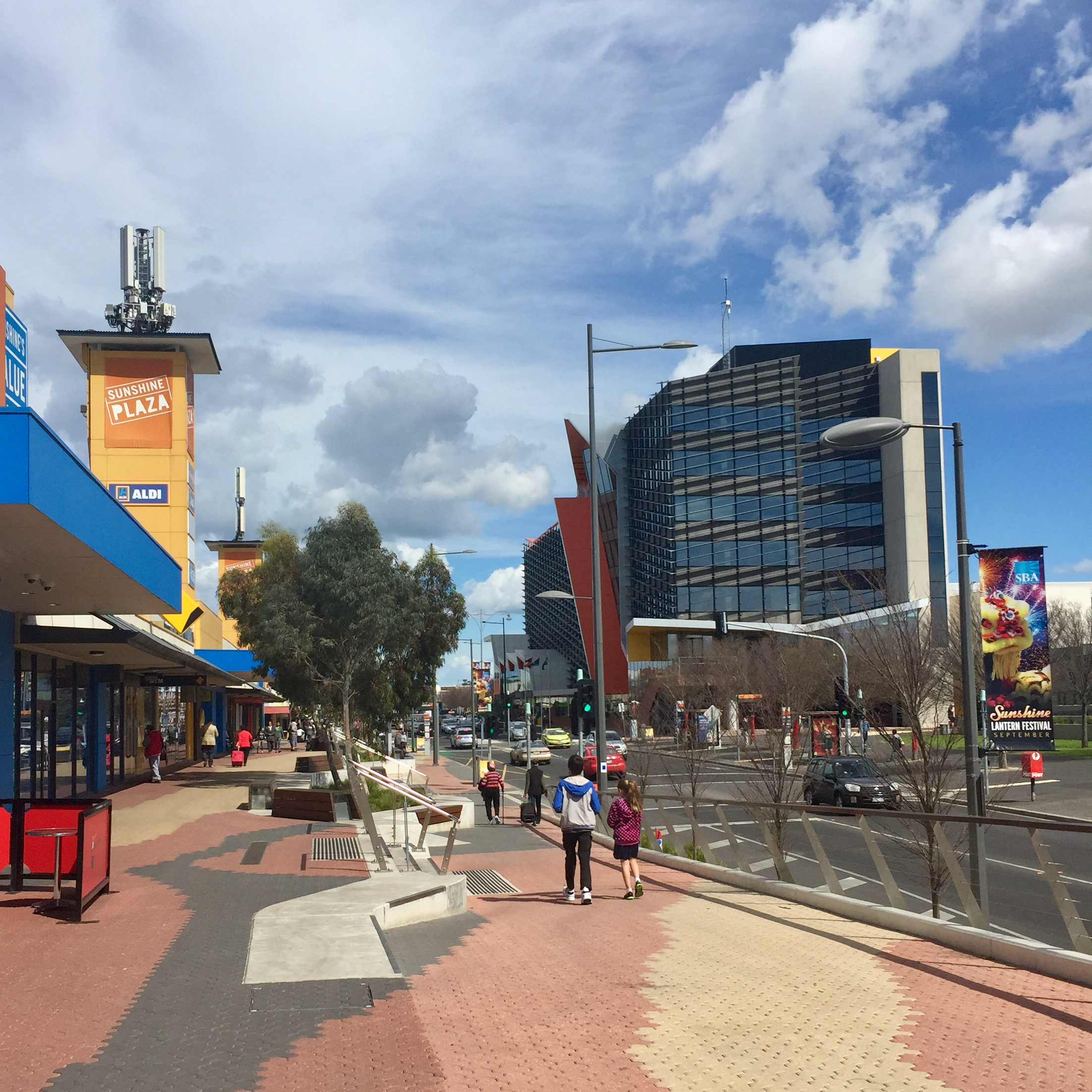
- Sunshine, Victoria, Australia

Party	Councillors
Independent Labor	5
Independent	4
Greens	1
Independent Liberal	1
Total	11

The councillors following the October 2024 local elections are:

Ward	Party	Councillor	Notes
Albanvale	Independent	Victoria Borg	Deputy Mayor
Cherry Creek	Independent Labor	Kim Thien Truong	
Copernicus	Independent Liberal	Maria Kerr	
Delahey	Independent Labor	Katharine Nikolic	
Grasslands	Independent Labor	Thuy Dang	Mayor
Harvester	Independent Labor	Daniel Kruk	
Horseshoe Bend	Independent	Virginia Tachos	
Kororoit Creek	Greens	Lucy Nguyen	
Mount Derrimut	Independent	Joh Bauch	
Organ Pipes	Independent Labor	Ranka Rasic	
St Albans East	Independent	Duyen Anh Pham	

== Mayors ==
=== Mayors (1998– 2009) ===
No.	Mayor	Party	Term
1	Ciro Lombardi	Labor	1998
2	Sam David JP	Labor	1998–1999
3	Brooke Gujinovic	Labor	1999–2000
4	Charlie Apap	Labor	2000–2001
5	Natalie Suleyman	Labor	2001–2002
6	Andres Puig	Labor	2002–2003
(2)	Sam David JP	Labor	2003–2004
(5)	Natalie Suleyman	Labor	2004–2006
7	Margaret Giudice	Labor	2006–2007
(2)	Sam David JP	Labor	2007–2008
8	Troy Atanasovski JP	Labor	2008–2009

=== Administrators (2009–2016) ===
Administrators	Term
Peter Lewinsky (chair); Joanne Anderson; Meredith Sussex AM	2009–2012
John Watson (chair); Peter Lewinsky; Jane Nathan	2012–2014
John Watson (chair); Jane Nathan; John Tanner	2014–2016

=== Mayors (2016–present) ===
No.	Mayor	Party	Term
9	John Hedditch	Independent	2016–2017
(7)	Margaret Giudice	Independent	2017–2018
10	Lucinda Congreve	Independent	2018–2019
11	Georgina Papafotiou	Independent	2019–2020
12	Ranka Rasic	Labor	2020–2021
13	Jasmine Nguyen	Labor	2021-2022
14	Bruce Lancashire	Independent	2022-2023
(12)	Ranka Rasic	Labor	2023-2024
15	Thuy Dang	Labor	2024-2025

== Demographics ==
Selected historical census data for City of Brimbank local government area
Census year		2001	2006	2011	2016	2021
Population	Estimated residents on census night	162,931	168,215	182,735	194,319	194,618
Population	LGA rank in terms of size within Victoria		3rd	3rd	▼6th	▲5th
Population	% of Victoria population	3.53%	▼3.41%	3.41%	▼3.28%	▼2.99%
Population	% of Australian population	0.87%	▼0.85%	0.85%	▼0.83%	▼0.77%
Cultural and language diversity						
Ancestry, top responses	Vietnamese	9.1%	▲10.7%	▲12.8%	▲16.0%	▲16.9%
Ancestry, top responses	Australian	15.1%	15.1%	▼12.9%	▼12.4%	▲12.6%
Ancestry, top responses	English	12.0%	▼11.8%	11.8%	▼11.7%	▼11.6%
Ancestry, top responses	Chinese	4.5%	▲5.1%	▲5.9%	▲6.5%	▲6.8%
Ancestry, top responses	Italian	8.3%	▼7.8%	▼7.0%	▼6.5%	▼6.2%
Ancestry, top responses	Maltese	9.4%	▼8.1%	▼6.7%	▼5.7%	▼5.2%
Language, top responses (other than English)	Vietnamese	10.4%	▲12.6%	▲14.2%	▲16.2%	▲18.5%
Language, top responses (other than English)	Tagalog/Filipino			2.7%	2.7%	▼2.5%
Language, top responses (other than English)	Greek	4.2%	▼3.7%	▼3.2%	▼2.7%	▼2.4%
Language, top responses (other than English)	Punjabi			2.3%	▲2.9%	▼2.2%
Language, top responses (other than English)	Arabic			2.3%	▼2.2%	2.2%
Language, top responses (other than English)	Macedonian	4.1%	▼3.5%	▼2.9%	▼2.4%	▼2.2%
Language, top responses (other than English)	Maltese	5.2%	▼4.0%	▼3.3%	▼2.7%	▼2.1%
Language, top responses (other than English)	Italian	4.6%	▼3.8%	▼3.2%	▼2.5%	▼2.0%
Religious affiliation						
Religious affiliation, top responses	Catholic	42.9%	▼40.1%	▼36.1%	▼31.3%	▼29.6%
Religious affiliation, top responses	No religion	7.9%	▲9.3%	▲11.0%	▲16.8%	▲21.0%
Religious affiliation, top responses	Buddhism	9.1%	▲10.8%	▲11.8%	▼10.8%	▲11.1%
Religious affiliation, top responses	Islam			5.6%	▲5.8%	▲6.7%
Religious affiliation, top responses	Orthodox	11.6%	▼10.5%	▼9.2%	▼6.4%	▼6.0%
Religious affiliation, top responses	Anglican	5.9%	▼5.3%	▼4.5%	▼3.1%	▼2.4%
Median weekly incomes						
Personal income	Median weekly personal income		A$358	A$429	A$487	
Personal income	% of Australian median income		76.8%	74.4%	73.6%	
Family income	Median weekly family income		A$1029	A$1195	A$1358	
Family income	% of Australian median income		87.8%	80.7%	78.3%	
Household income	Median weekly household income		A$921	A$1106	A$1263	
Household income	% of Australian median income		98.2%	89.6%	87.8%	
Dwelling structure						
Dwelling type	Separate house	88.7%	▼82.4%	▼76.9%	▼73.2%	
Dwelling type	Semi-detached, terrace or townhouse	4.0%	▲10.3%	▼5.0%	▲13.1%	
Dwelling type	Flat or apartment	6.3%	▲7.0%	▲7.5%	▼4.5%	

== Townships and localities ==
The 2021 census, the city had a population of 194,618 up from 194,319 in the 2016 census

Population
Locality	2016	2021
Albanvale	5,491	5,641
Albion	4,731	4,334
Ardeer	3,103	3,170
Brooklyn^	8	10
Cairnlea	9,657	10,038
Calder Park	0	0
Deer Park	18,126	18,145
Delahey	8,339	8,077
Derrimut	8,269	8,651
Hillside^	1,174	1,156
Kealba	3,194	3,226
Keilor^	5,853	5,906
Keilor Downs	9,995	9,857
Keilor East^	0	0
Keilor Lodge	1,752	1,668
Keilor North	67	67
Keilor Park	2,719	2,684
Kings Park	8,198	8,203
St Albans	37,309	38,042
Sunshine	9,768	9,445
Sunshine North	11,700	12,047
Sunshine West	18,580	18,552
Sydenham	10,838	10,578
Taylors Lakes	15,519	15,174
Tullamarine^	11	9

^ - Territory divided with another LGA

== Environmental issues ==
In 2021, Brimbank was recognised as Melbourne's smelliest local government area with more than 640 complaints from residents mainly due to the large amount of industries in the area. This includes the Kealba Sunshine Landfill which produced a smell described as "rotting carcasses" for three years. EPA Victoria suspended and then cancelled the license to operate the landfill by Barro Group.

== Bibliography ==
- Brouwer, G E (7 May 2009), Investigation into the alleged improper conduct of councillors at Brimbank City Council (PDF), Melbourne: Ombudsman Victoria, archived from the original (PDF) on 18 April 2020 Alt URL
- Scales, Bill (21 August 2009), Report on the monitoring of the ongoing activities and performance of the Brimbank City Council (PDF), Melbourne: Local Government Victoria
