= Keilor North =

- Suburb
- Interactive map of Keilor North
- Coordinates: 37.680°S 144.784°E
- Country: Australia
- State: Victoria
- City: Melbourne
- LGA: City of Brimbank
- Location: 21 km (13 mi) from Melbourne

Government
  - State electorate: Sydenham
  - Federal division: Hawke

Area
  - Total: 0.8 km^{2} (0.31 sq mi)
- Elevation: 112 m (367 ft)

Population
  - Total: 67 (2021 census)
  - Density: 84/km^{2} (217/sq mi)
- Postcode: 3036
Suburbs around Keilor North
Diggers Rest	Bulla	Melbourne Airport
Calder Park	Keilor North	Melbourne Airport
Taylors Lakes	Taylors Lakes	Keilor

Keilor North is a suburb in Melbourne, Victoria, Australia, 21 km (13 mi) north-west of Melbourne's Central Business District, located with the City of Brimbank local government area. Keilor North recorded a population of 67 at the 2021 census.

It is identified as one of Melbourne's areas of natural significance. Its close proximity to the Organ Pipes National Park along with its environs overlay, known as the Green Wedge, means that many threatened and rare grass species are found in the area.

Golfers can play at the Keilor Public Golf Course on the Calder Highway.

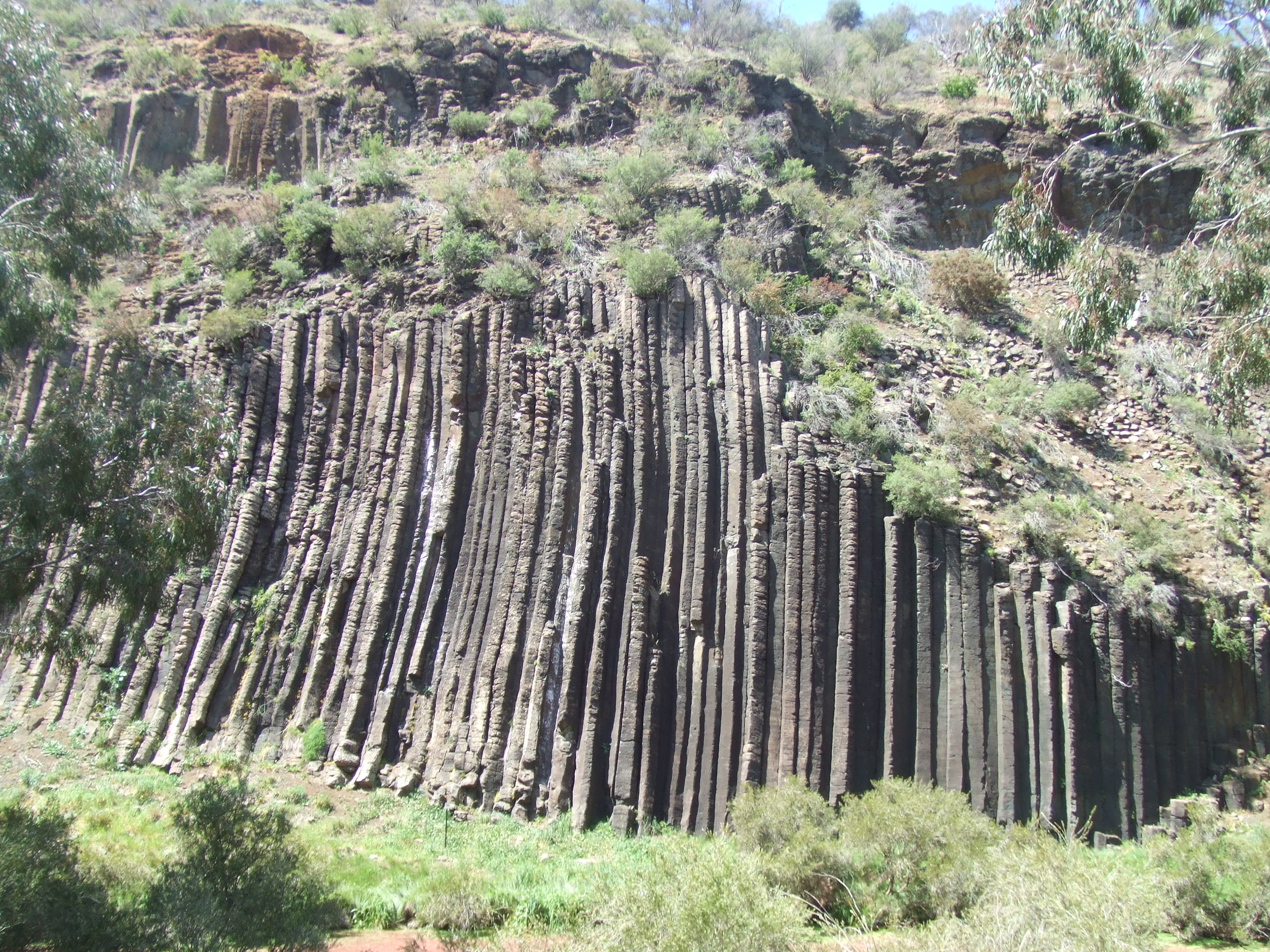
The Organ Pipes geological feature in Keilor North

== See also ==
- City of Keilor – Keilor North was previously within this former local government area.
