= City of Keilor =

Coordinates: 37°43′S 144°50′E

City of Keilor Victoria
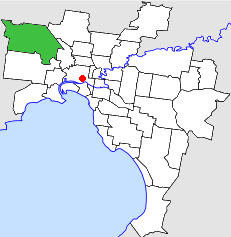
- Location in Melbourne
- The City of Keilor as at its dissolution in 1994
- Population: 110,500 (1992)
  - Density: 1,108.3/km^{2} (2,870.5/sq mi)
- Established: 1863
- Area: 99.70 km^{2} (38.5 sq mi)
- Council seat: Keilor
- Region: Northwestern Melbourne
- County: Bourke
LGAs around City of Keilor:
Melton	Bulla	Broadmeadows
Melton	City of Keilor	Essendon
Melton	Sunshine	Sunshine

The City of Keilor was a local government area about 13 kilometres (8 mi) northwest of Melbourne, the state capital of Victoria, Australia. The city covered an area of 99.70 square kilometres (38.49 sq mi), and existed from 1863 until 1994.

== History ==
Keilor was first incorporated as a road district on 3 March 1863. It became a shire on 22 December 1871, and was proclaimed a city on 29 April 1961. Its boundaries were relatively stable throughout its existence, however, parts of Essendon North were transferred to the City of Essendon in 1993.

On 15 July 1975, after a number of years of factional infighting, the council was suspended.

On 15 December 1994, the City of Keilor was abolished, and its area divided by the Maribyrnong River and the Albion-Jacana freight railway line; its eastern section was merged with the City of Essendon, to form the newly created City of Moonee Valley, while its western section was merged with parts of the City of Sunshine, including St Albans, to form the newly created City of Brimbank. Melbourne Airport and a small section of Tullamarine, north of Sharps Road, were transferred to the newly created City of Hume.

== Wards ==
The City of Keilor was divided into three wards, each electing three councillors:

- Doutta Galla-Tullamarine Ward
- Maribyrnong Ward
- Niddrie Ward

== Suburbs ==
- Airport West
- Avondale Heights
- Calder Park*
- Essendon West
- Kealba
- Keilor+
- Keilor Downs
- Keilor East
- Keilor North
- Keilor Park
- Kings Park
- Melbourne Airport (shared with the Shire of Bulla)
- Niddrie
- St Albans (shared with the City of Sunshine)
- Sydenham
- Taylors Lakes
- Tullamarine (shared with the City of Broadmeadows)

* Suburb gazetted since the amalgamation.
+ Council seat.

== Population ==
Year	Population
1954	10,681
1958	18,100*
1961	29,519
1966	43,363
1971	55,616
1976	70,587
1981	81,762
1986	93,327
1991	106,076

* Estimate in the 1958 Victorian Year Book.
