= Keilor, Victoria =

Keilor
- Suburb
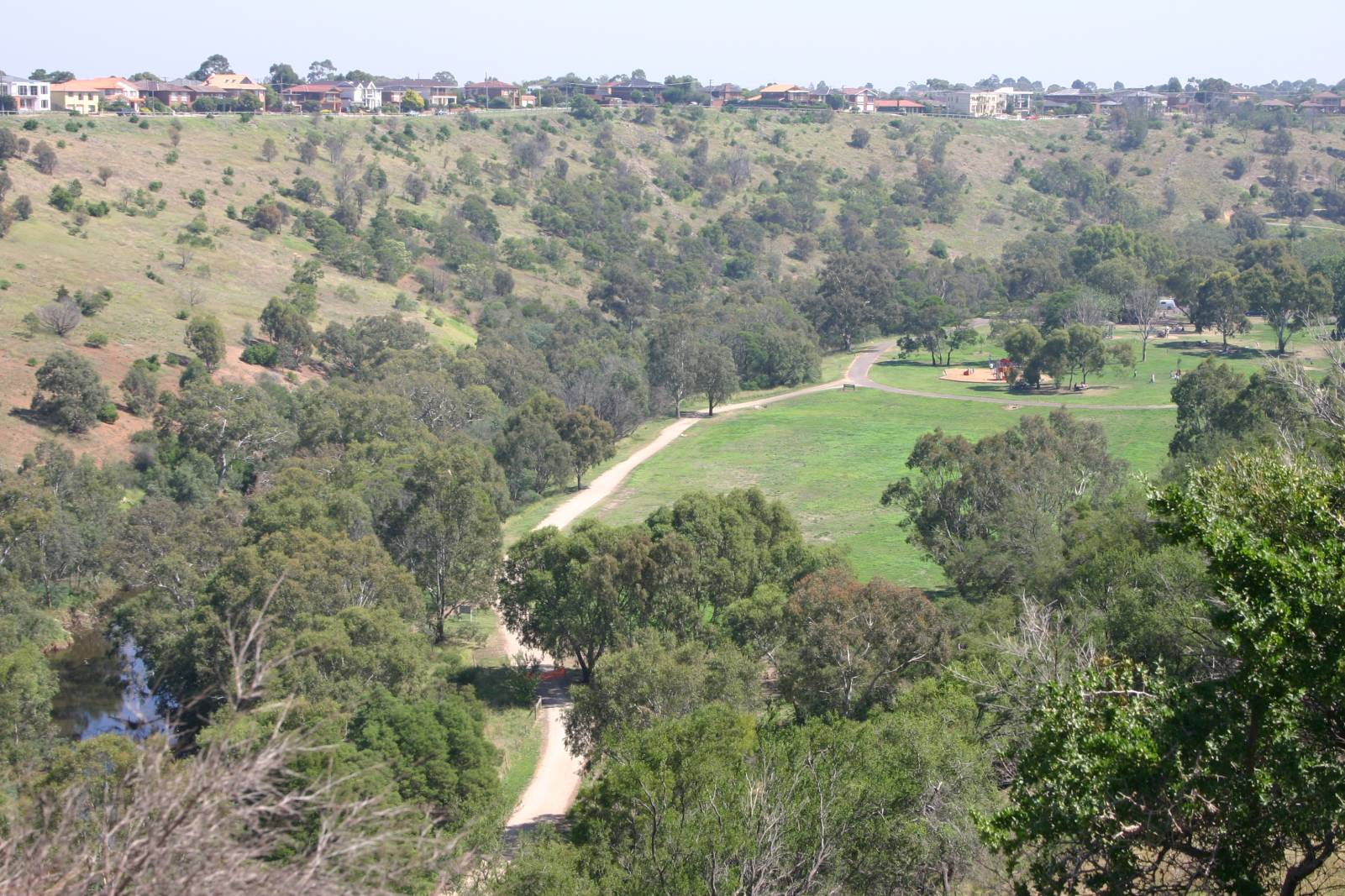
- Brimbank Park

- Interactive map of Keilor
- Coordinates: 37.712°S 144.831°E
- Country: Australia
- State: Victoria
- City: Melbourne
- LGAs: City of Brimbank; City of Hume
- Location: 16 km (9.9 mi) NW of Melbourne

Government
  - State electorates: Niddrie; Sunbury
  - Federal divisions: Hawke; Fraser; Gorton

Area
  - Total: 16.4 km^{2} (6.3 sq mi)
- Elevation: 36 m (118 ft)

Population
  - Total: 5,906 (2021 census)
  - Density: 360.1/km^{2} (932.7/sq mi)
- Postcode: 3036
Suburbs around Keilor
Keilor Lodge	Melbourne Airport	Tullamarine
Taylors Lakes	Keilor	Keilor Park
Keilor Downs	Kealba	Keilor East

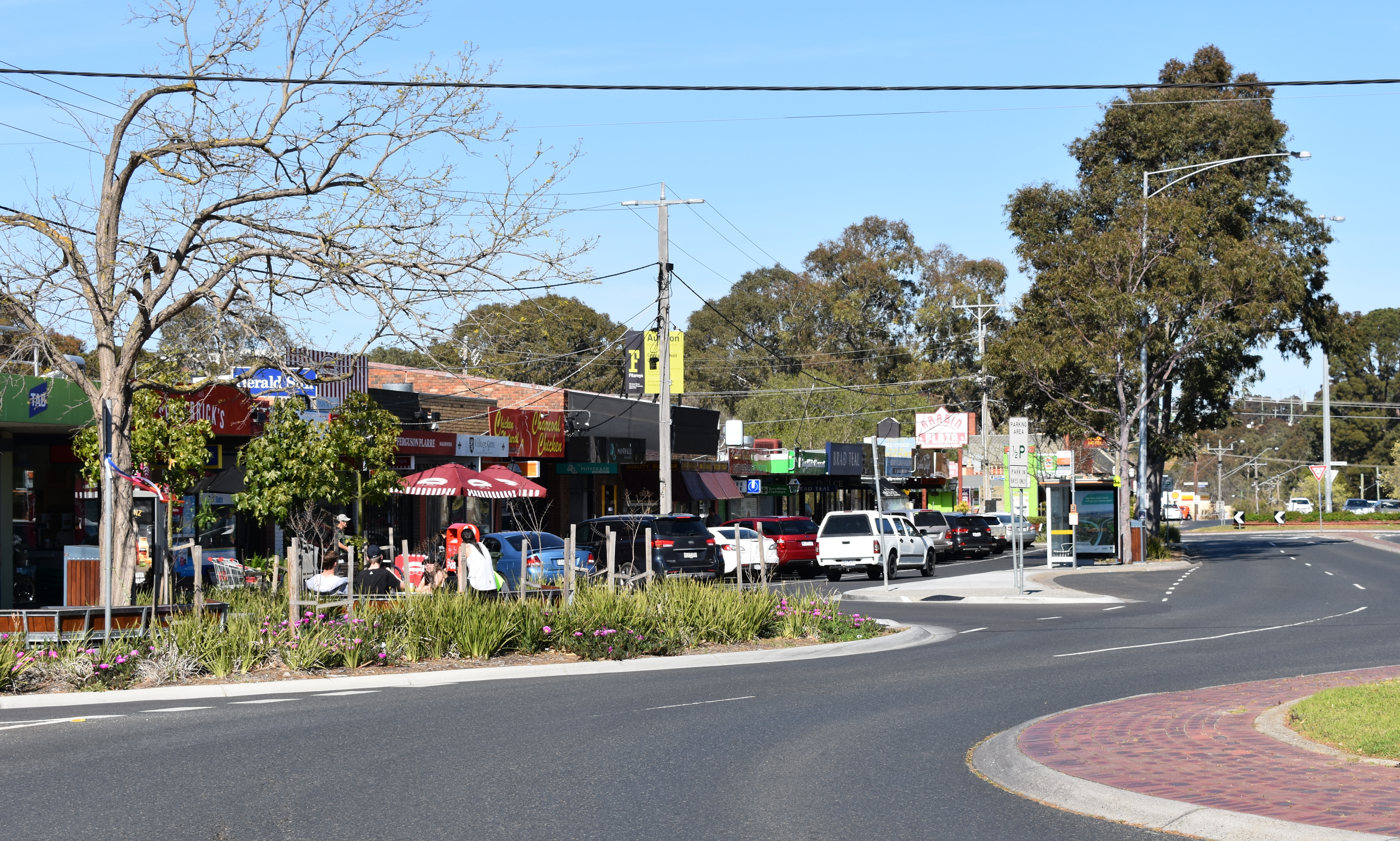
Keilor Village shopping strip

Keilor (/kiːlər/) is a suburb in Melbourne, Victoria, Australia, 16 km (9.9 mi) north-west of Melbourne's Central Business District, located within the Cities of Brimbank and Hume local government areas. Keilor recorded a population of 5,906 at the 2021 census.

Whilst most of the suburb is contained within the City of Brimbank, the northern section of Keilor, north of the Calder Freeway, is within the City of Hume. This section of the suburb is located on the flood plain of the Maribyrnong River, and is home to many market gardens.

The suburb is mainly residential with large industrial developments in adjacent suburbs. There are several shopping centres in the area including Keilor Shopping Centre and Watergardens Town Centre approximately 5 km away.

== History ==
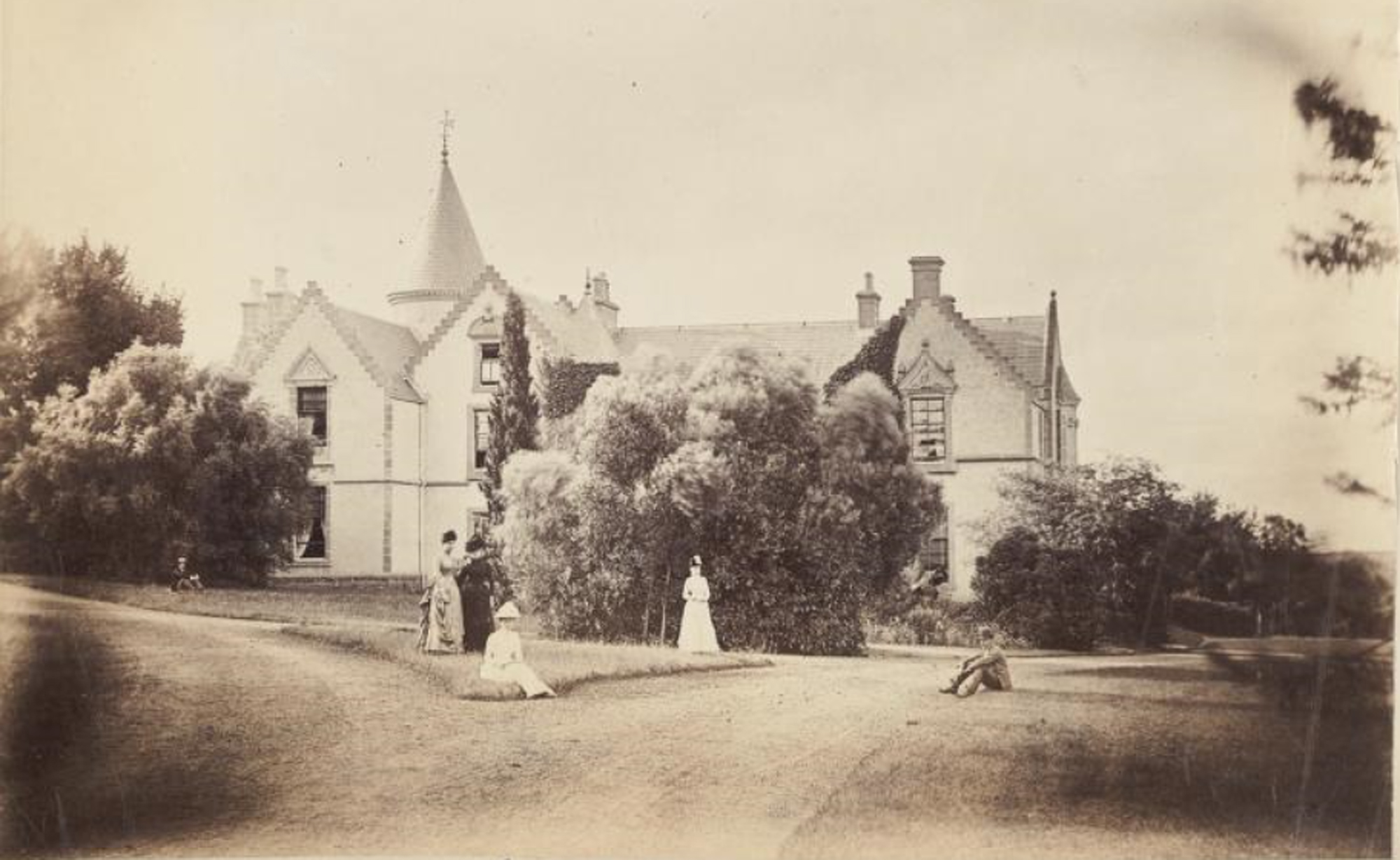
Overnewton, in 1887

Keilor is a township in a basin of the Maribyrnong River. James Watson from Scotland was the first land-holder in the district and also gave the suburb its name. Keilor in the early times of the gold diggings was a noted camping place for bullock teams to and from the diggings at Castlemaine and Ballarat. Spanning the river was a wooden bridge which was replaced by an iron bridge in 1868.

About 1 million years ago lava covered the previous landscape and created basalt plains. Over time, the Maribyrnong River carved itself through the basalt plains. Australian megafauna including 3-metre high kangaroos and Diprotodons were found in the area until extinction about 13,000 years ago at the end of the ice age.

The Wurundjeri Indigenous Australians inhabited the area for approximately 40,000 years. It is one of the oldest inhabited sites in Australia.

In about 1838-39 the first European settlements were established by pastoralists James Watson and Alexander and John Hunter. James Watson is thought to have named their home station after a farm called Keillor [sic] in Forfarshire, Scotland, one of four which his father, Hugh Watson, tenanted.

One of the earliest settlers in Keilor was William Taylor who, in 1849, bought 5,300 hectares (13,000 acres) in the district and built a house which he called Overnewton. He transformed this building in 1859 into a Scottish Baronial mansion known today as Overnewton Castle.

In the 1850s people would stopover at Keilor during their travels from Melbourne to the Bendigo goldfields. Keilor saw an influx of new settlers who intended to cash in on this new market. Keilor Post Office opened on 2 March 1854 and a general store, blacksmith, hotel, police station, courthouse and bridge were all built during this time. The area became an agricultural district and remained so until after World War II when the suburb saw a rapid increase in population due to cheap land and the establishment of large industries in surrounding suburbs.

=== Heritage listings ===
The following places in Keilor are listed on the Victorian Heritage Register:

- Arundel Road Trestle Bridge over the Maribyrnong River;
- Keilor Iron Bridge over the Maribyrnong River
- Keilor Hotel, 670–674 Old Calder Highway
- Overnewton, including the homestead at 51 Overnewton Road, and the gatehouse at 804–804A Old Calder Highway

== Sport ==
Keilor Football Club, an Australian Rules football team, competes in the Essendon District Football League.

Golfers play at the Keilor Public Golf Course on the Calder Highway in the neighbouring suburb of Keilor North.

== Facilities ==
Keilor Fire Station is a Melbourne suburban fire station.

== Notable people ==
- Dante Exum, a NBA basketball player, played for Keilor
- Brendan O'Connor, a former federal minister, lives in Keilor
- Mark Viduka, an English Premier League player and former captain of the Australian National Football Team, grew up in Keilor

== See also ==
- City of Keilor – Keilor was previously within this former local government area.
- Brimbank Park
- Electoral district of Keilor
