= Watergardens Town Centre =

- Coordinates: 37°41′58″S 144°46′33″E
- Address: Melton Highway; Taylors Lakes, Victoria, Australia
- Opened: 29 September 1997; 29 years ago
- Developer: Queensland Investment Corporation
- Owner: Queensland Investment Corporation
- Num. of stores: 224
- Floor area: 115,000 m^{2} (1,240,000 sq ft)
- Floors: 3 (including the loading dock, the rooftop carpark & Timezone)
- Parking: 4,700
- Public transit: Watergardens station
- Website: watergardens.qicgre.com

Watergardens Town Centre is a super regional shopping centre located in Taylors Lakes, 24 kilometres north-west of Melbourne, Victoria, Australia. It opened in 1997, and is owned by the Queensland Investment Corporation.

== History ==
The site was purchased by the Queensland Investment Corporation (QIC) in February 1995, with construction commencing in October 1996. The initial proposal for the site included 30,000 m^{2} (320,000 sq ft) of retail space at the cost of A$100,000,000 (equivalent to $195,846,094 in 2022), with anchor tenants Bi-Lo, Hoyts, Woolworths and Target. The centre opened as Watergardens Shopping Centre on 29 September 1997 with 100 speciality stores: the name Watergardens was reportedly chosen in homage of the adjacent Taylors Creek.

The adjacent Watergardens Town Centre Homemaker Centre opened in 2001, expanding to 15,000 m^{2} (160,000 sq ft) of retail space in 2002. Watergardens railway station was also opened in 2002 following the extension of M>Train's St Albans services to Sydenham, with QIC purchasing the naming rights to the station.

A further expansion to the centre was announced in 2003, adding a further 25,000 m^{2} (270,000 sq ft) of retail space south of the complex. Construction commenced in December 2005 and was originally planned to open in April 2007, but was delayed until May of that year. The expansion included Big W, JB Hi-fi and a second Woolworths supermarket. A record crowd attended the centre on 23 December 2007, with more than 45,000 customers attending the centre.In 2008 Myer planned to open a branch at the shopping centre which was eventually scrapped in 2012.

An expansion of the centre was undertaken between 2019 and 2020, resulting in the closure of the Coles (previously Bi-lo) store. The expansion, known as 'The Marketplace', was completed in 2020 and included an Aldi supermarket.

As part of nationwide restructuring, the Target store was replaced by Kmart in early-mid 2021.

In June 2023 the second Woolworths supermarket, which opened as part of the second expansion of the centre in 2007, was closed. This resulted in a revamp of the South Mall, which saw the opening of TK Maxx and the relocation and expansion of Cotton On Mega, Kathmandu, Rebel Sport and EB Games Australia, opening on 7 March 2024.

== Transport connections ==
Watergardens is serviced by the adjacent Watergardens railway station, with all Metro Trains Sunbury line and some V/Line Bendigo line trains stopping at the station. Seven bus routes originate at Watergardens station, with the 476 to Moonee Ponds Junction making additional stops to the north of the main complex building and outside the homemaker centre complex.

== Tenants ==
Watergardens Town Centre has more than 115,000 m^{2} (1,240,000 sq ft) of floor space, comprising 250 stores including a Woolworths supermarket, Aldi, Big W, Kmart, Rebel Sport, JB Hi-Fi, Hoyts, with Zone Bowling & Timezone on the rooftop. Tenants at the adjacent homemaker centre include Bunnings and Harvey Norman.

== See also ==
- Taylors Lakes, Victoria
- List of largest shopping centres in Australia
