= Sydenham, Victoria =

Sydenham Melbourne, Victoria
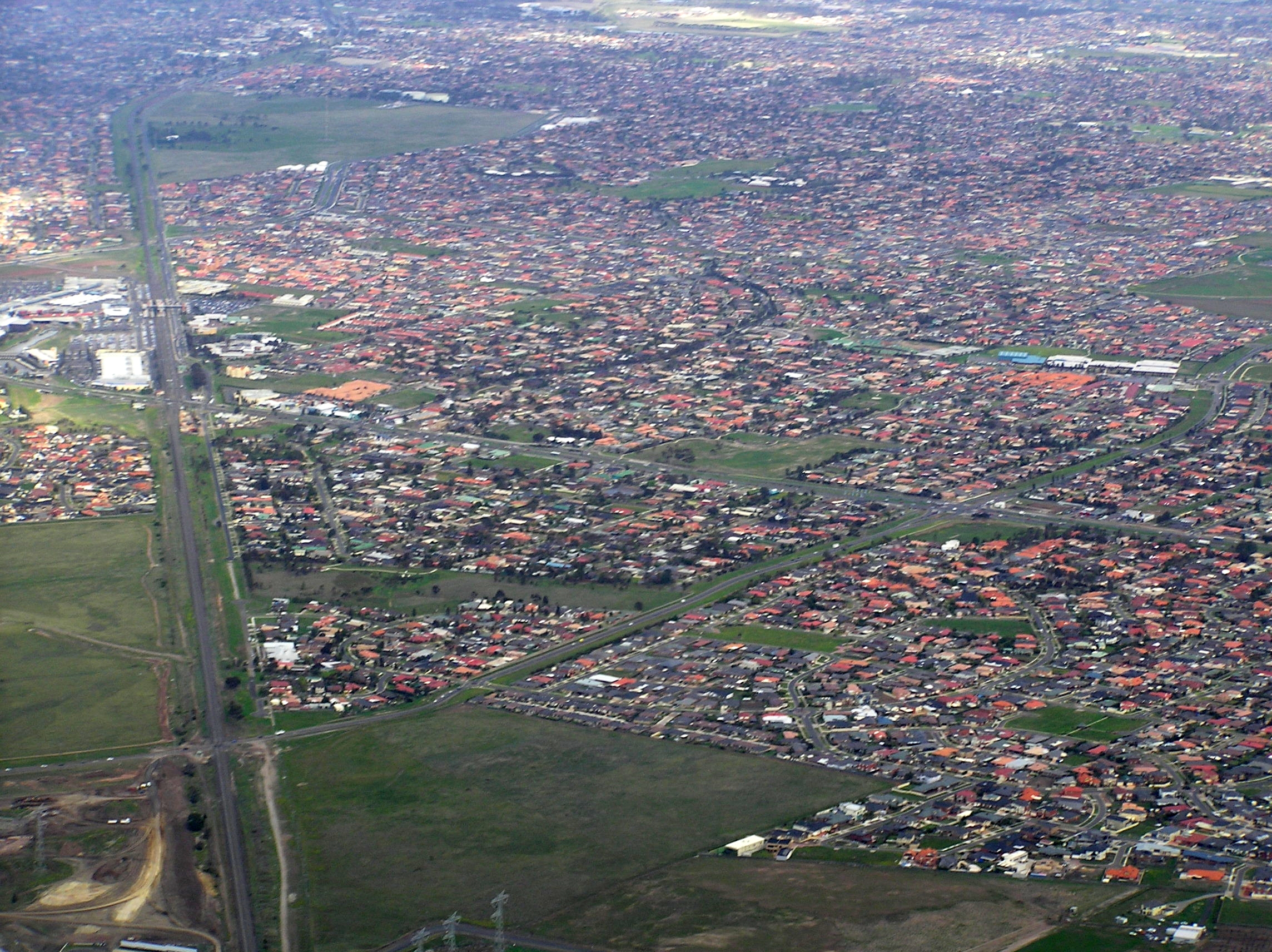

- Coordinates: 37.702°S 144.767°E
- Population: 10,578 (2023 census)
  - Density: 2,940/km^{2} (7,610/sq mi)
- Postcode(s): 3037
- Area: 3.6 km^{2} (1.4 sq mi)
- Location: 22 km (14 mi) from Melbourne
- LGA(s): City of Brimbank
- State electorate(s): Sydenham
- Federal division(s): Gorton
Suburbs around Sydenham:
Hillside	Calder Park	Taylors Lakes
Hillside	Sydenham	Taylors Lakes
Taylors Hill	Delahey	Keilor Downs

Sydenham is a suburb in Melbourne, Victoria, Australia, 22 km (14 mi) north-west of Melbourne's Central Business District, located within the City of Brimbank local government area. Sydenham recorded a population of 10,578 at the 2021 census.

== History ==
Sydenham Post Office opened on 26 August 1861. A railway station, known as Keilor Road, was opened in 1859 and renamed Sydenham on 1 April 1887. Jock Mac Rob and Graham Homes were two of the early Station Masters ROB. The station was relocated before reopening as Watergardens in 2002, with the extension of the electric rail service to the suburb. Watergardens is on the Sunbury railway line and was a terminus station until November 2012.

== Today ==
=== Education facilities ===
The area includes the Catholic Regional College Sydenham, a coeducational Catholic senior high school and shares some of its grounds with Emmaus Catholic Primary School. It also includes the Sydenham-Hillside Primary School, which is one of the country's largest government primary school and the Sydenham Campus of Copperfield College.

=== Churches ===
There are a number of Churches including the Macedonian Orthodox Church "Nativity of the Holy Mother of God" which is located near the Watergardens railway station. Also, the Sydenham Baptist Church, Town Well Uniting Church, Australian Christian Churches Victoria, Assemblies of God, and a few others.

=== Parks and Reserves ===
Flagship Park: Pioneer Park (71–79 Victoria Road Sydenham) Totals 3.3 hectares and supports the Natural Temperate Grasslands of the Victorian Volcanic Plains. It contains one of the largest remaining catchments of Kangaroo Grass in the metropolitan Melbourne area protected by Environmental laws. Has park seating with unique playground equipment, sculptures, and significant native vegetation.

=== Reserves ===
- Delbridge Drive Reserve
- Esplanade Reserve
- Orchid Square Reserve
- Overton Lea Reserve
- Rose Hedge/Roseleigh Reserve
- Stagecoach Reserve

== Sport ==
Hillside Football Club, an Australian Rules football team, competes in the Essendon District Football League. Sydenham Park Soccer Club competes in the north west state 2

Calder Park Raceway is located just to the north of Sydenham.

== See also ==
- City of Keilor – Sydenham was previously within this former local government area...
