= Taylors Lakes =

- Suburb
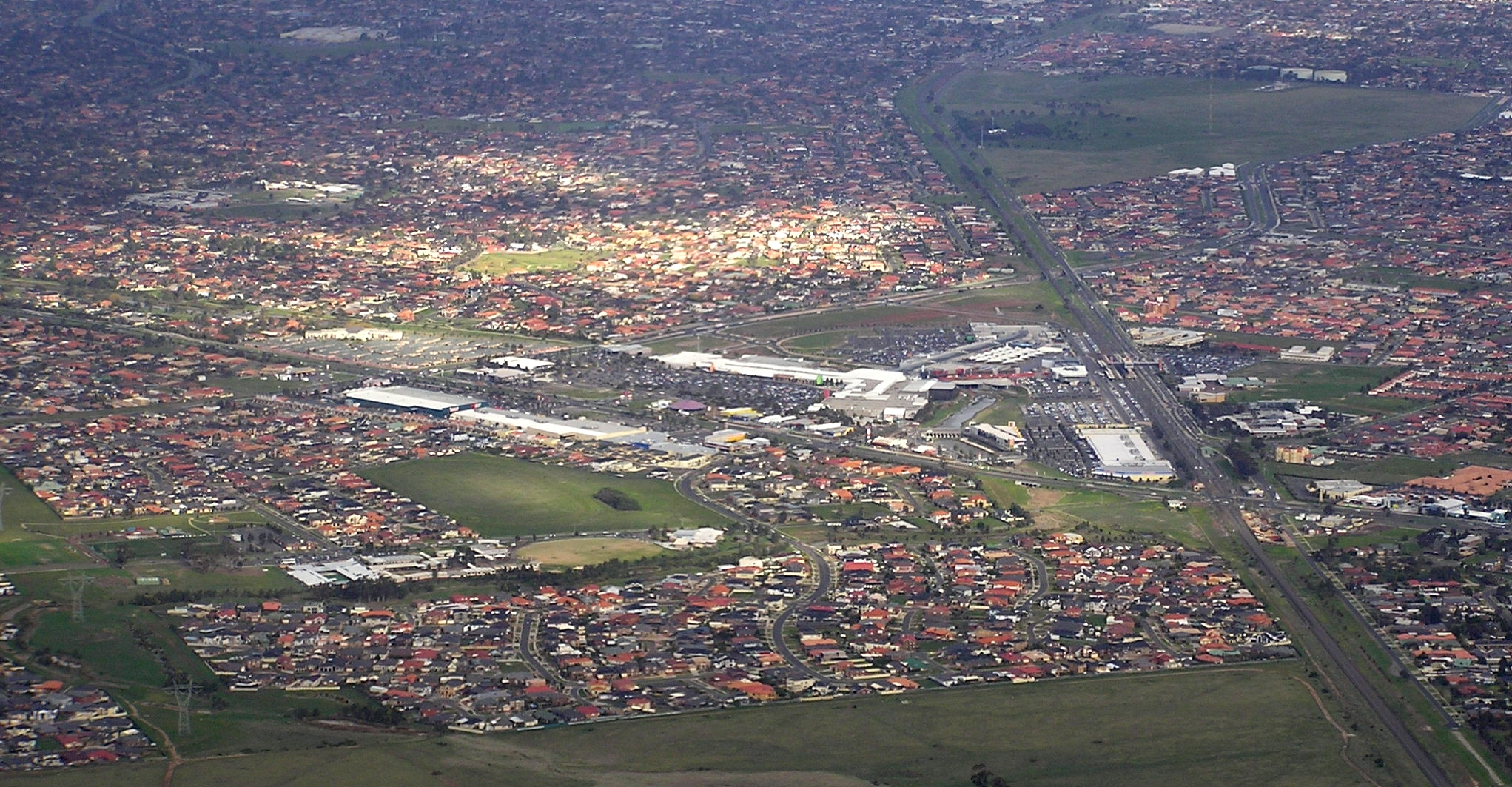

- Interactive map of Taylors Lakes
- Coordinates: 37.701°S 144.796°E
- Country: Australia
- State: Victoria
- City: Melbourne
- LGA: City of Brimbank
- Location: 20 km (12 mi) from Melbourne; 6 km (3.7 mi) from Melbourne Airport
- Established: 1970s

Government
  - State electorates: Niddrie; Sydenham
  - Federal division: Gorton

Area
  - Total: 7.8 km^{2} (3.0 sq mi)

Population
  - Total: 16,910 (2021 census)
  - Density: 2,168/km^{2} (5,610/sq mi)
- Postcode: 3038
Suburbs around Taylors Lakes
Calder Park	Keilor North	Keilor North
Sydenham	Taylors Lakes	Keilor
Delahey	Keilor Downs	Keilor

Taylors Lakes is a suburb in Melbourne, Victoria, Australia, 20 km (12 mi) north-west of Melbourne's Central Business District, located within the City of Brimbank local government area. Taylors Lakes recorded a population of 16,910 at the 2021 census.

Taylors Lakes is bounded by the Calder Freeway in the north, Overnewton Road and Taylors Creek in the east, Lady Nelson Way in the south and the Bendigo railway line in the west. The suburb is mostly composed of recent developments dating from the 1990s, with Taylors Lakes Post Office opening on 18 August 1994.

One of Keilor's earliest settlers was the Scotsman William Taylor, who built the Overnewton homestead in 1849. Taylors Creek was named after him, which in turn gives the name of the suburb.

There are many available facilities in Taylors Lakes, such as shopping centres, cinemas, bowling alley, schools, a railway station, bus routes, parks and gardens, sports grounds, roads, houses and kindergartens. It also has the largest rate of Southern/Eastern European ancestry of any Melbourne suburb.

== Demographics ==
According to data from the 2021 census:

- The most common ancestries in Taylors Lakes were Australian 17.9%, Italian 17.2%, English 15.0%, Maltese 8.0% and Greek 7.3%.
- In Taylors Lakes, 64.3% of people were born in Australia. The most common countries of birth were India 3.2%, Italy 2.9%, North Macedonia 2.3%, Vietnam 2.0% and Malta 1.9%.
- 57.6% of Taylors Lakes residents speak only English at home. The next most common responses for Language spoken in Taylors Lakes were Italian 4.5%, Greek 4.3%, Macedonian 3.7%, Arabic 3.7%, Croatian 2.9%.

== Recreational Club ==
Taylors Lakes is home to the Taylors Lakes Recreational Club, which includes the Taylors Lakes Football Club competing in the Essendon District Football League, Taylors Lakes Cricket Club, Taylors Lakes Basketball Club, Taylors Lakes Tennis Club and Gardening Club.

== Transport ==
The suburb is serviced by trains on the Sunbury line, a number of which terminate at Watergardens station, and a number of connecting bus services to local areas. In 2007, a Victorian Department of Infrastructure survey revealed that the Sydenham line registered the biggest increase in passenger numbers, up 25%. In 2006, the Sydenham line was one of only three lines that operated above the passenger load limit. The Victorian Government has plans to add extra tracks on the service.

The Taylors Creek Trail runs along Taylors Creek and provides ready access to Watergardens Town Centre and Watergardens station. A handful of bus routes run throughout the Taylors Lakes district.

== Commercial ==
The suburb of Taylors Lakes has two commercial shopping centres, one being Taylors Lakes Shopping Centre which has a Woolworths supermarket, a Fresh Food Market and 20 specialty stores; and the other being Watergardens Town Centre, which is a lot larger in its trading area.

== Utilities ==
Telephone and internet services in the suburb of Taylors Lakes are provided through Telstra owned Sydenham and Taylors Lakes telephone exchanges. Over 90% of Taylors Lakes telephone numbers begin with "9390". Electricity is provided by Powercor owned St Albans zone substation, which also provides electricity to the surrounding suburbs.

== See also ==
- City of Keilor – Taylors Lakes was previously within this former local government area.
