= Arden railway station, Melbourne =

Railway station in Victoria, Australia

Arden
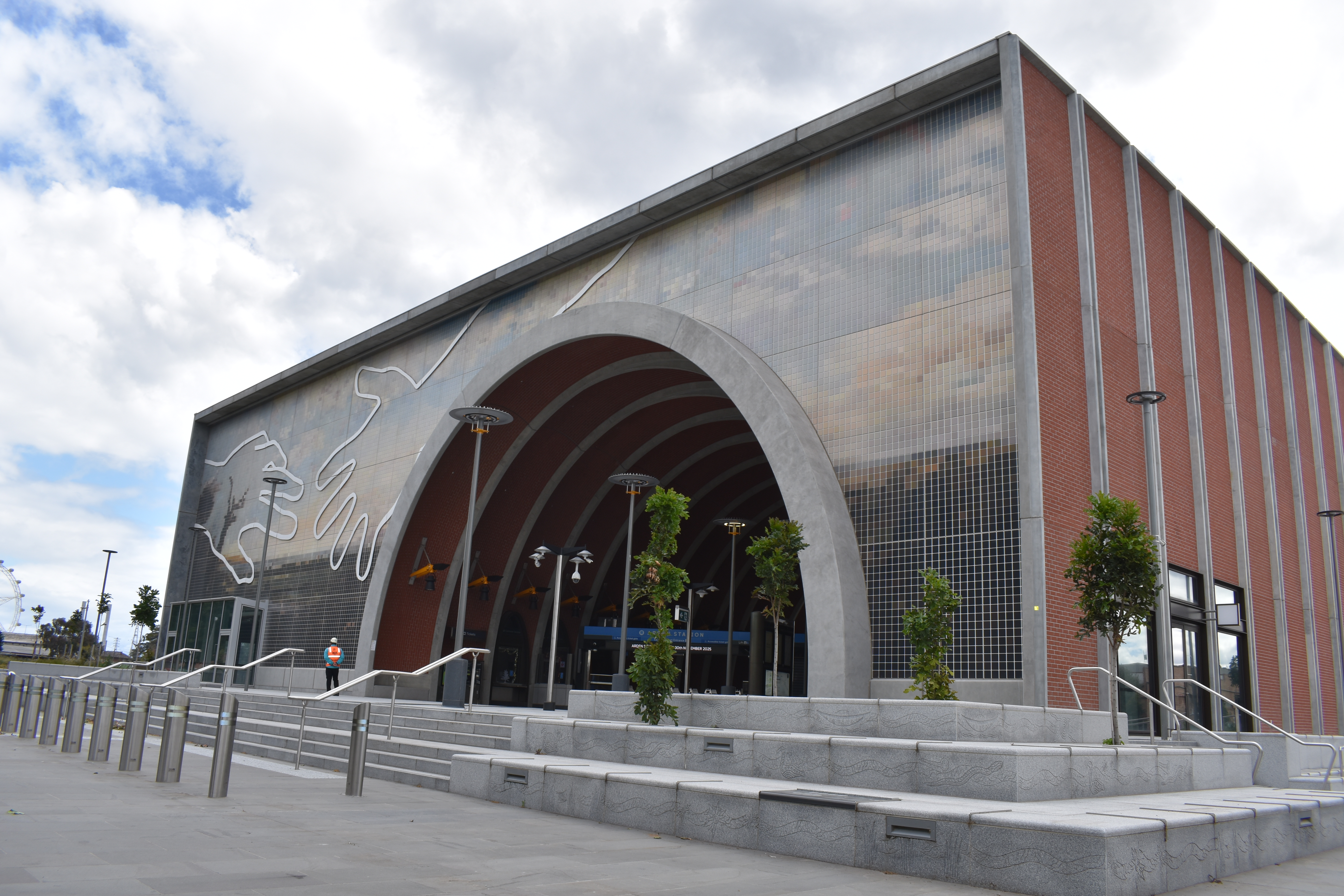
- Station building and entrance, November 2025

General information
- Location: Laurens Street, North Melbourne, Victoria 3051; City of Melbourne; Australia
- Coordinates: 37.80193°S 144.94031°E
- System: PTV commuter rail station
- Owner: VicTrack
- Operator: Metro Trains
- Line: Sunbury
- Distance: 6.37 kilometres from Southern Cross
- Platforms: 2
- Tracks: 2

Construction
- Structure type: Underground
- Accessible: Yes—step free access

Other information
- Status: Operational, premium station
- Station code: ARN
- Fare zone: Myki zone 1
- Website: Public Transport Victoria

History
- Opened: 30 November 2025; 11 months ago
- Electrified: Yes (1500 V DC overhead)

Services
| Preceding station | Metro Trains | Following station |
|---|---|---|
| Parkville towards Cranbourne or East Pakenham via Metro Tunnel | Sunbury line | Footscray towards Watergardens or Sunbury |
Track layout
Location

Arden railway station is an underground railway station operated by Metro Trains Melbourne on the Sunbury line, part of the Melbourne rail network. It serves the inner north-western Melbourne suburb of North Melbourne in Victoria, Australia.

Opened as part of the Metro Tunnel project, Arden is an underground premium station, featuring an island platform with two platforms. Major construction commenced in April 2018 and completed in January 2024. The station was constructed using the cut-and-cover method. The station opened on 30 November 2025, along with the rest of the Metro Tunnel.

The station sits in a major inner-city urban renewal area for Melbourne, and will anchor the new high-density suburb of Arden. A structure plan for the former industrial area was gazetted in 2022.

== Location ==
Arden Street was chosen as the site for a new railway station to support the expansion of the central city and provide a focus for the development of a new commercial, residential and activity centre in North Melbourne.

The station complex is located on the old headquarters of Albion Reid, a quarrying company that had leased the site from the state government for several decades. In 1968, the Masaga Group proposed to turn the site into a modern industrial estate. However, only two factories were ever built by the company. This created Barwise Street, which borders the station precinct.

The development plan for Arden Station described the site as "under-used industrial land".

The Victorian government stated that Arden station will support job creation by improving public transport access to inner-west Melbourne, an area which has been earmarked for urban renewal. Fifty-six hectares of land around Arden Station, much of which is owned by the State Government, is earmarked for revitalisation as part of the project. The new suburb is expected to house around 15,000 people and provide 34,000 jobs.

The Arden Station location also played a key role in supporting the construction of the western section of the Metro Tunnel, as it housed many important facilities such as a concrete batching facility, offices, and storage areas for concrete segments. Tunnel boring machines were launched towards the western tunnel entrance in Kensington from this location in 2019.

== Naming ==
Following a state government-led naming competition, it was announced that the new station was to be named North Melbourne upon its completion, with the existing North Melbourne railway station to be renamed West Melbourne. However, after a number of security and logistical concerns relating to renaming the existing North Melbourne station became apparent, the government announced that it had decided to retain the station's working name of Arden.

== Design ==
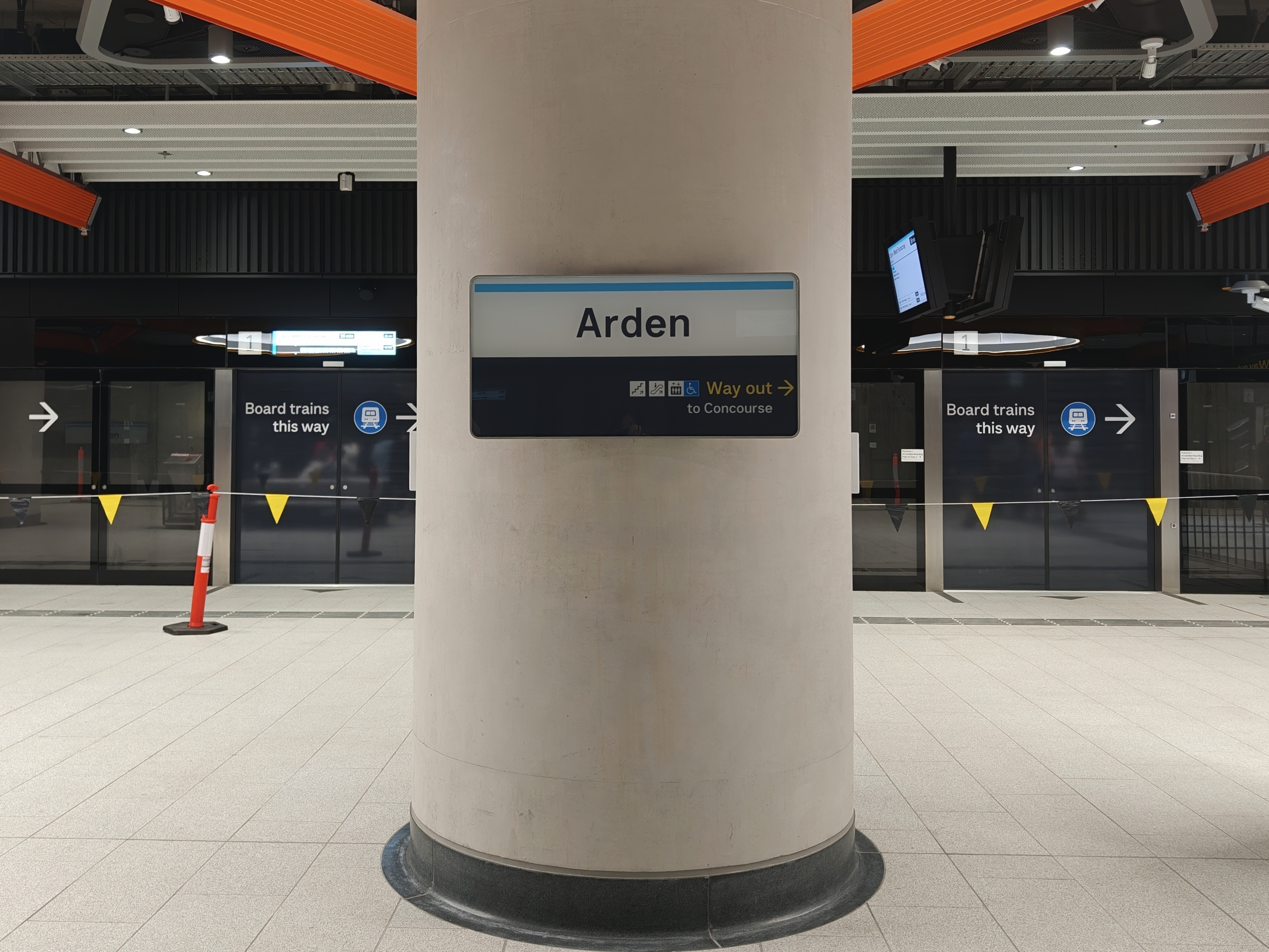
Arden Station Sign

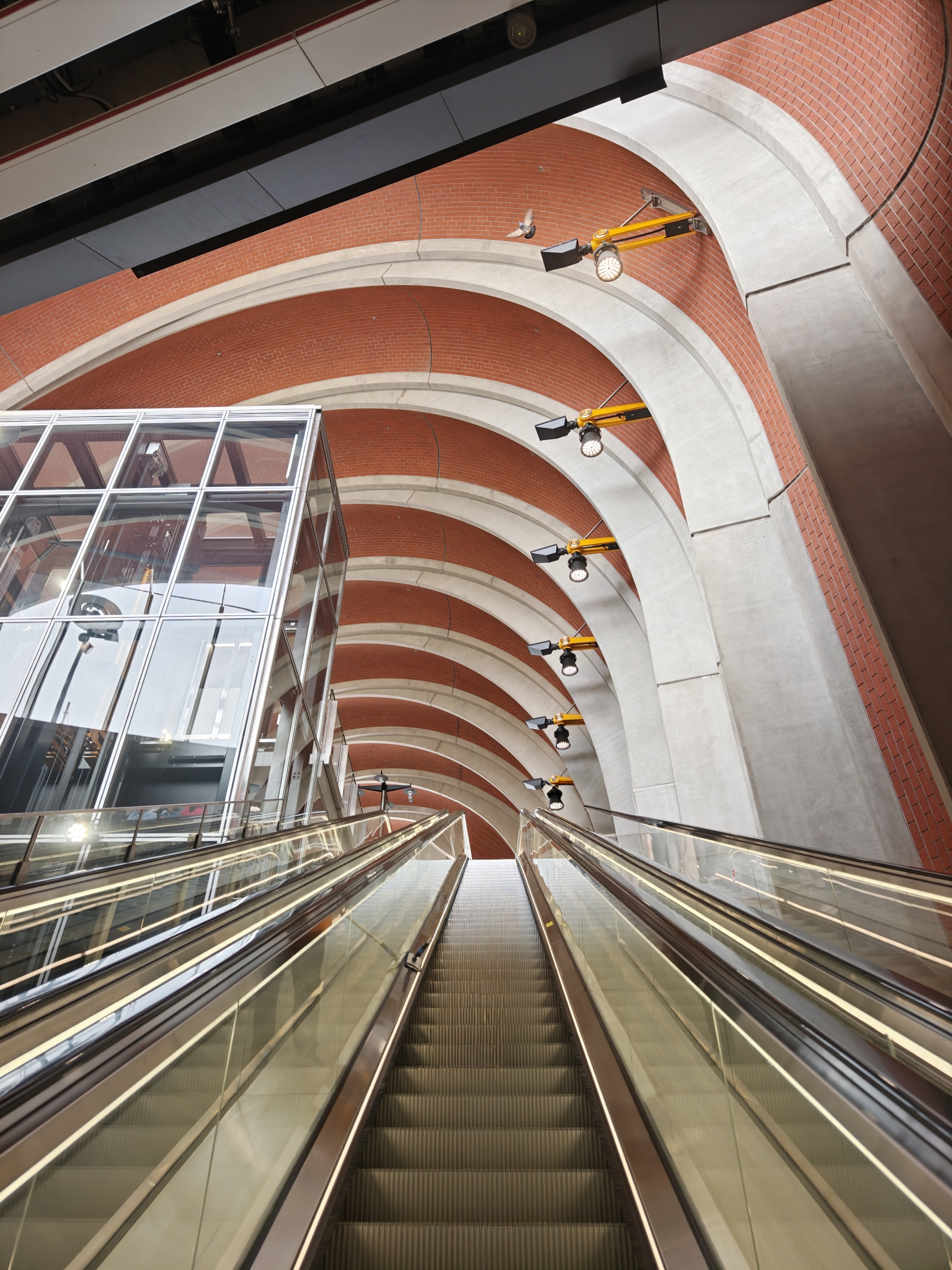
Arden Station Entrance

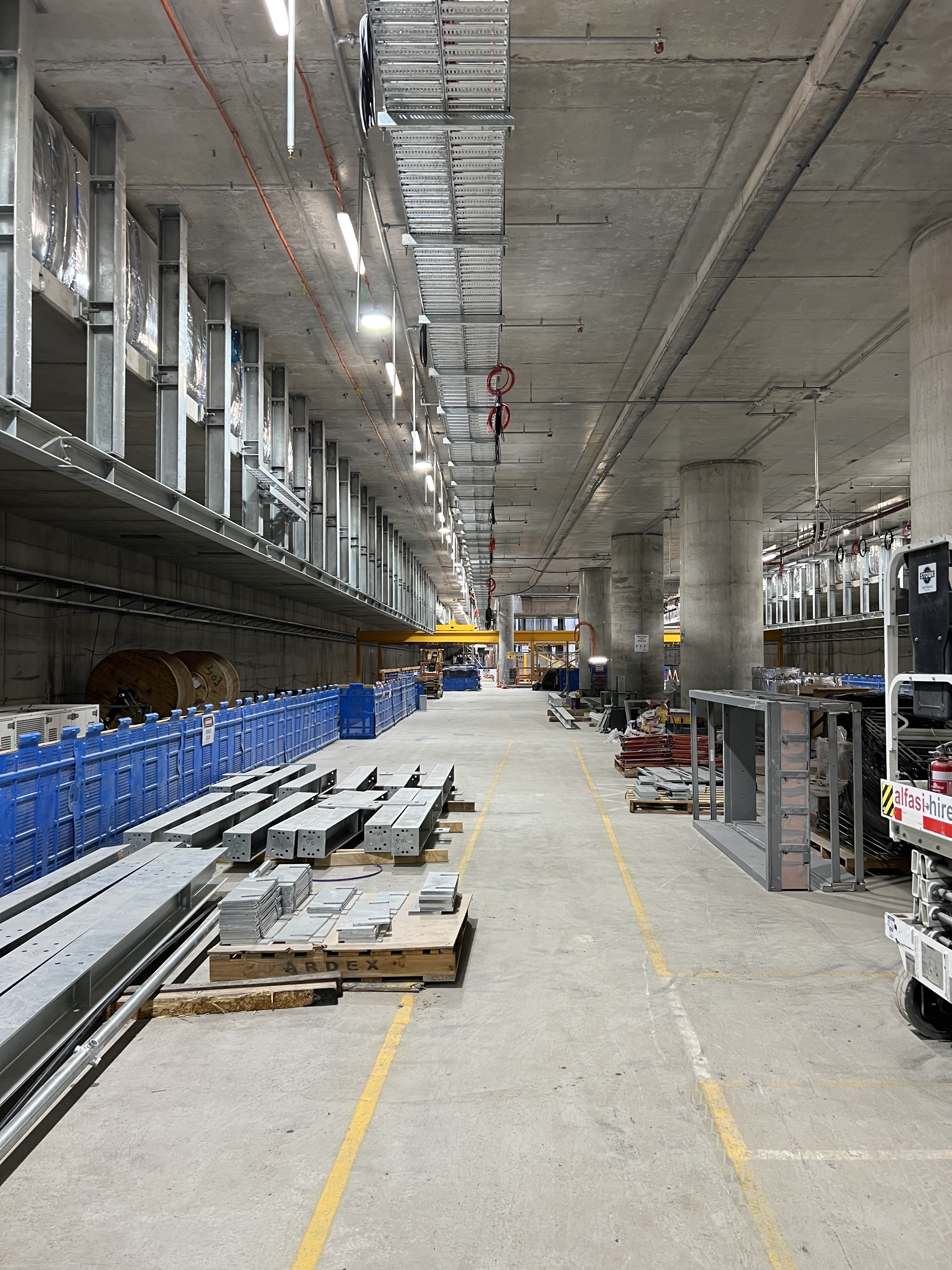
Arden station platforms under construction, March 2022

The station's external design, made out of clay brick, will reflect the area's industrial heritage. A café will be included in the station, with areas for outdoor dining. New public gathering space will provide space for locals and passengers to enjoy. As the station may be prone to flooding, drainage at the station has been designed to capture the natural flow of rainwater and distribute it into nearby garden beds.

The central gateway feature of the design is set of 15 large brick archways above the station entrance. The concrete arches are lined with 104,000 locally manufactured bricks, and were made offsite then craned onto site in 2022. The station entrance area is raised 150 centimetres (4 ft 11 in) to prevent flooding of the tunnel from the nearby Moonee Ponds creek. The station was designed by RSHP, Hassell and Weston Williamson.

A permanent artwork is being created for the station by Abdul Abdullah as part of the Metro Tunnel project's legacy artwork program. The artwork, titled Come Together, will cover the eastern facade of Arden with a mosaic recreating J.S. Calder’s painting View from Royal Park across West Melbourne Swamp (1860) with outstretched aluminium hands reaching across the mosaic.

== Arden precinct ==
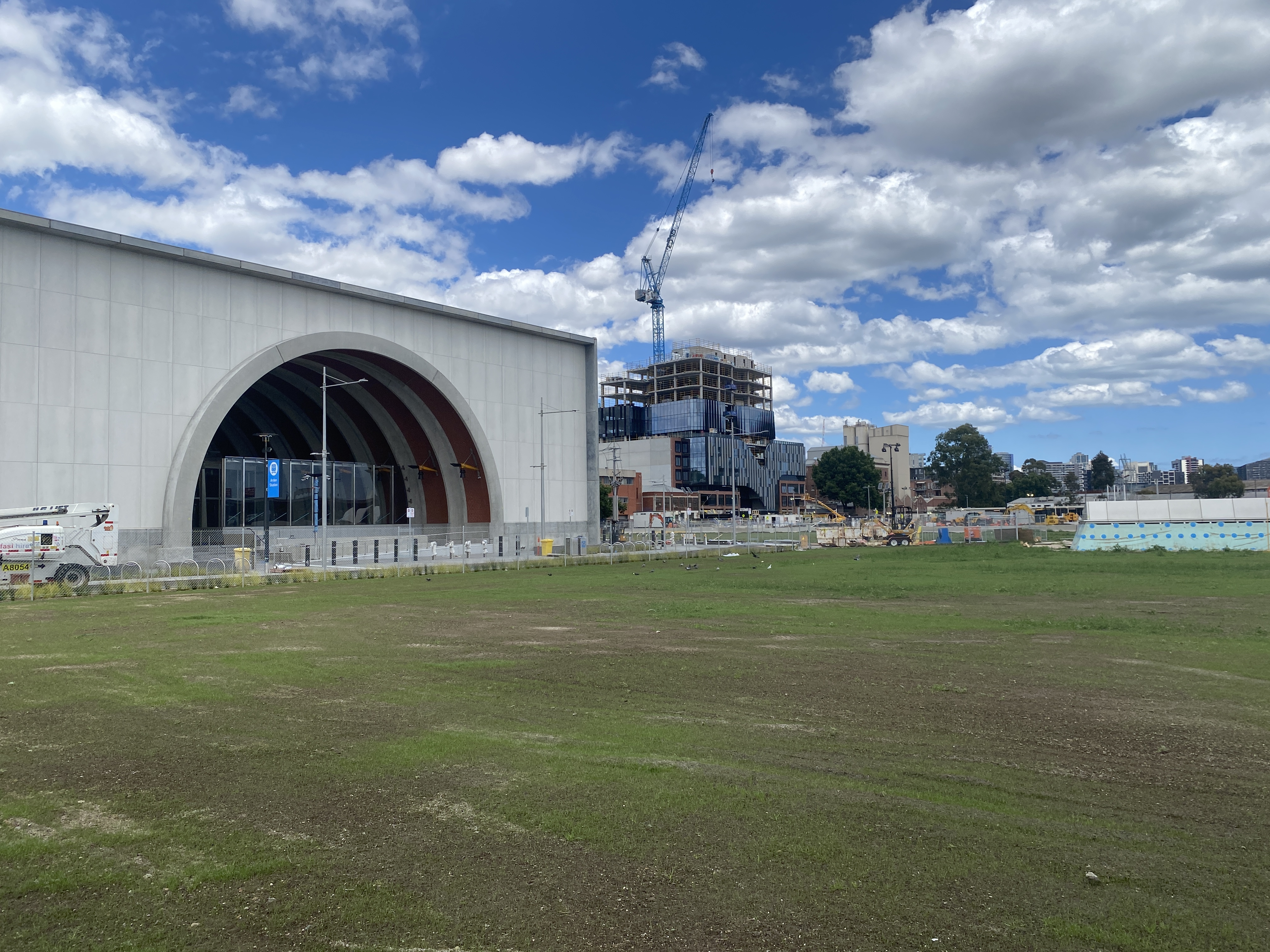
The back of Arden station, showing space for future development opportunities, December 2023

The Metro Tunnel is set to transform the Arden precinct, with around 6,000 square metres (65,000 sq ft) of public gathering space likely to be created. As the area is also prone to flooding, the flood-resistant “urban sponge” landscape strategy will be used to absorb stormwater. This will include rain gardens, tree planters and permeable paving. Nearby streets such as Laurens and Barwise Street will be upgraded to be more pedestrian-oriented.

== Station layout ==
| G | Street level | Entrance/Exit, customer service, retail |
| B1 | Concourse |
| B2; Platforms | Platform 1 | Sunbury line towards Sunbury (Footscray) → |
| B2; Platforms | Island platform, doors will open on the right |
| B2; Platforms | Platform 2 | ← Sunbury line towards East Pakenham or Cranbourne (Parkville) |

== Transport links ==
Yarra Trams operates one service via Arden Station on Abbotsford Street and Queensberry Street

- : West Maribyrnong – Flinders Street Station

Transit Systems Victoria operates one route via Arden station, under contract to Public Transport Victoria:

- 241 : North Melbourne station – Yarra Bend Park

== Gallery ==
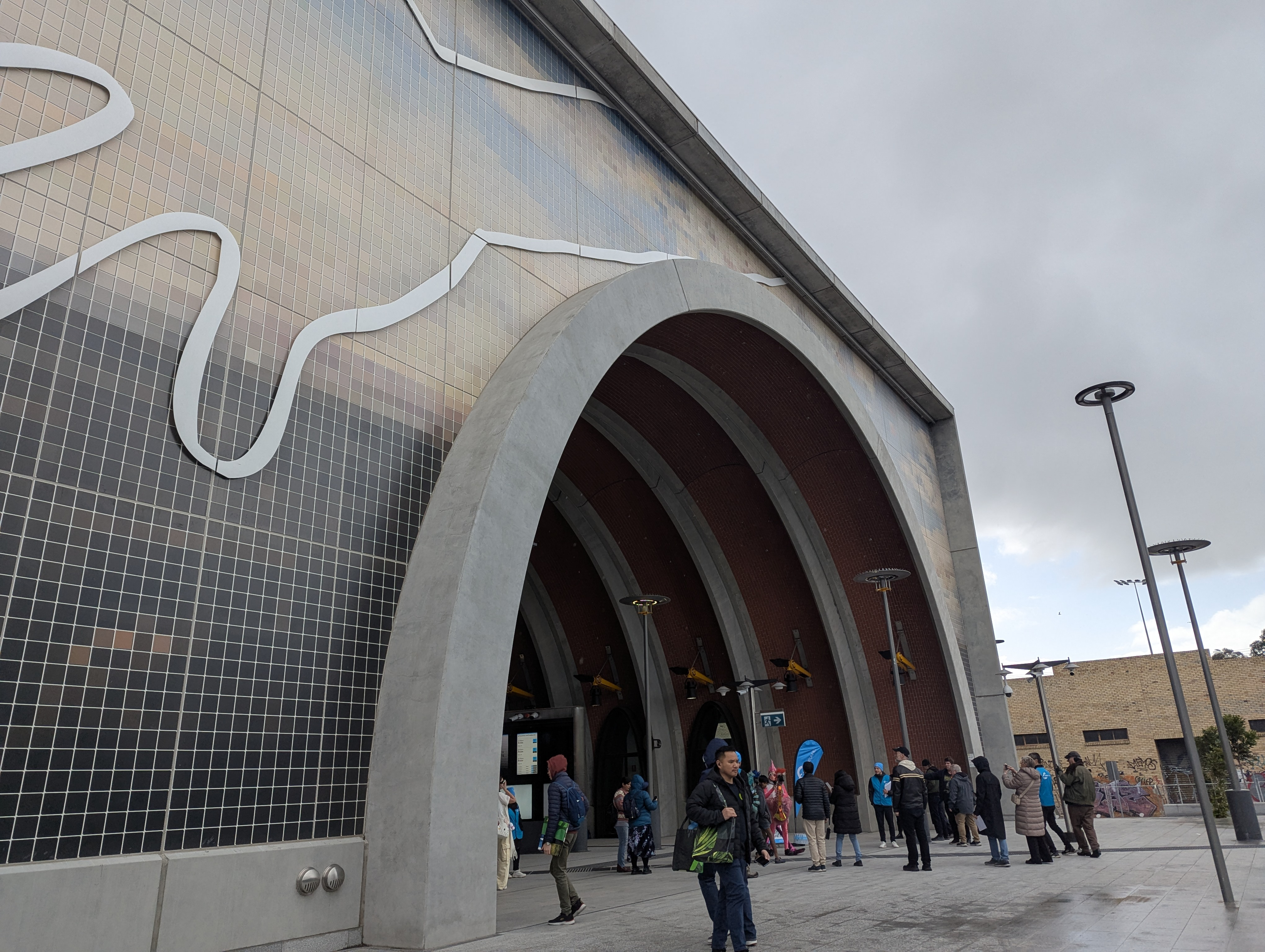
Station entrance building on 30 August 2025

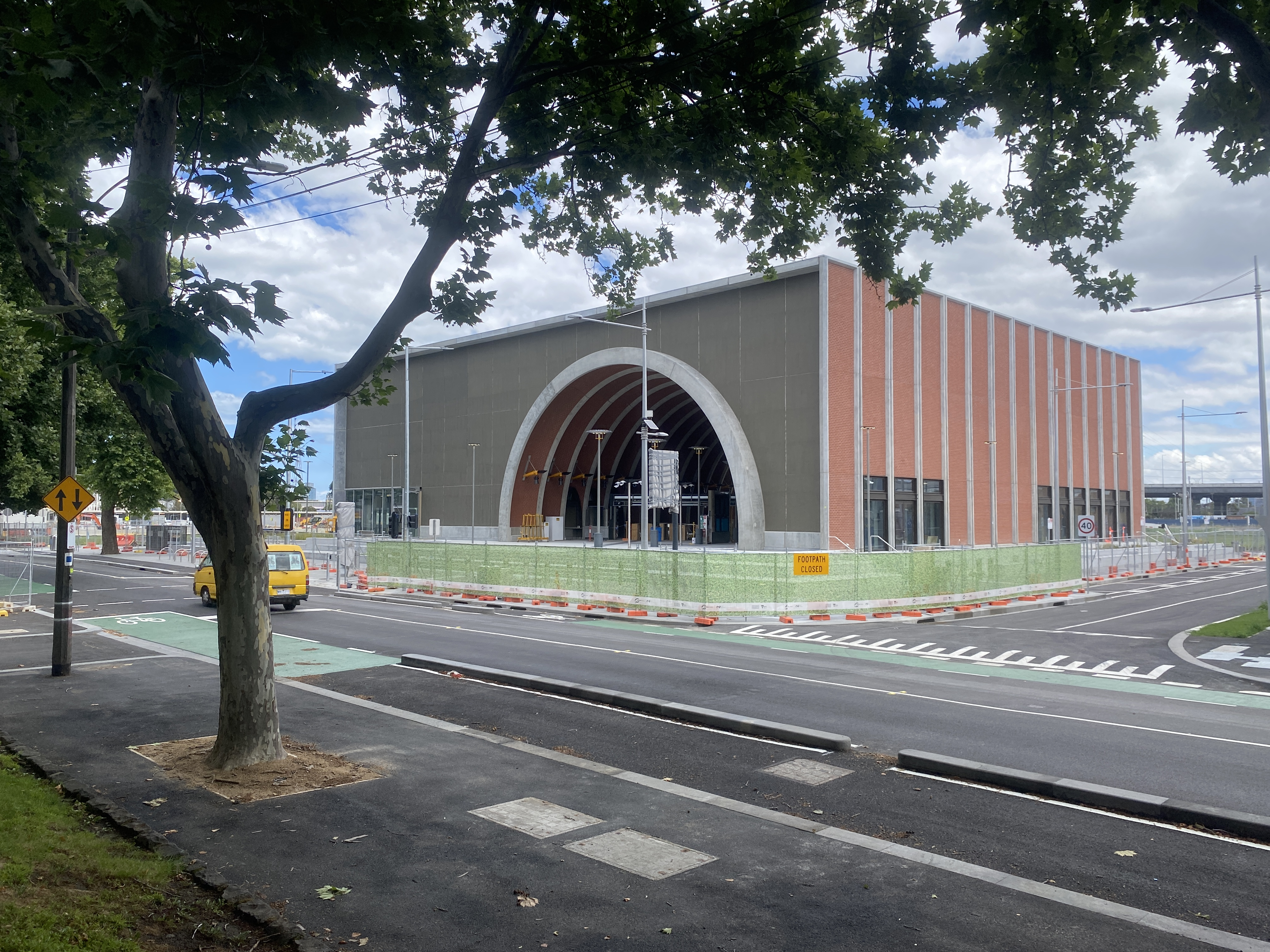
View of the near completed station building at Arden, December 2023
