= St Albans railway station, Melbourne =

Railway station in Melbourne, Australia

St Albans
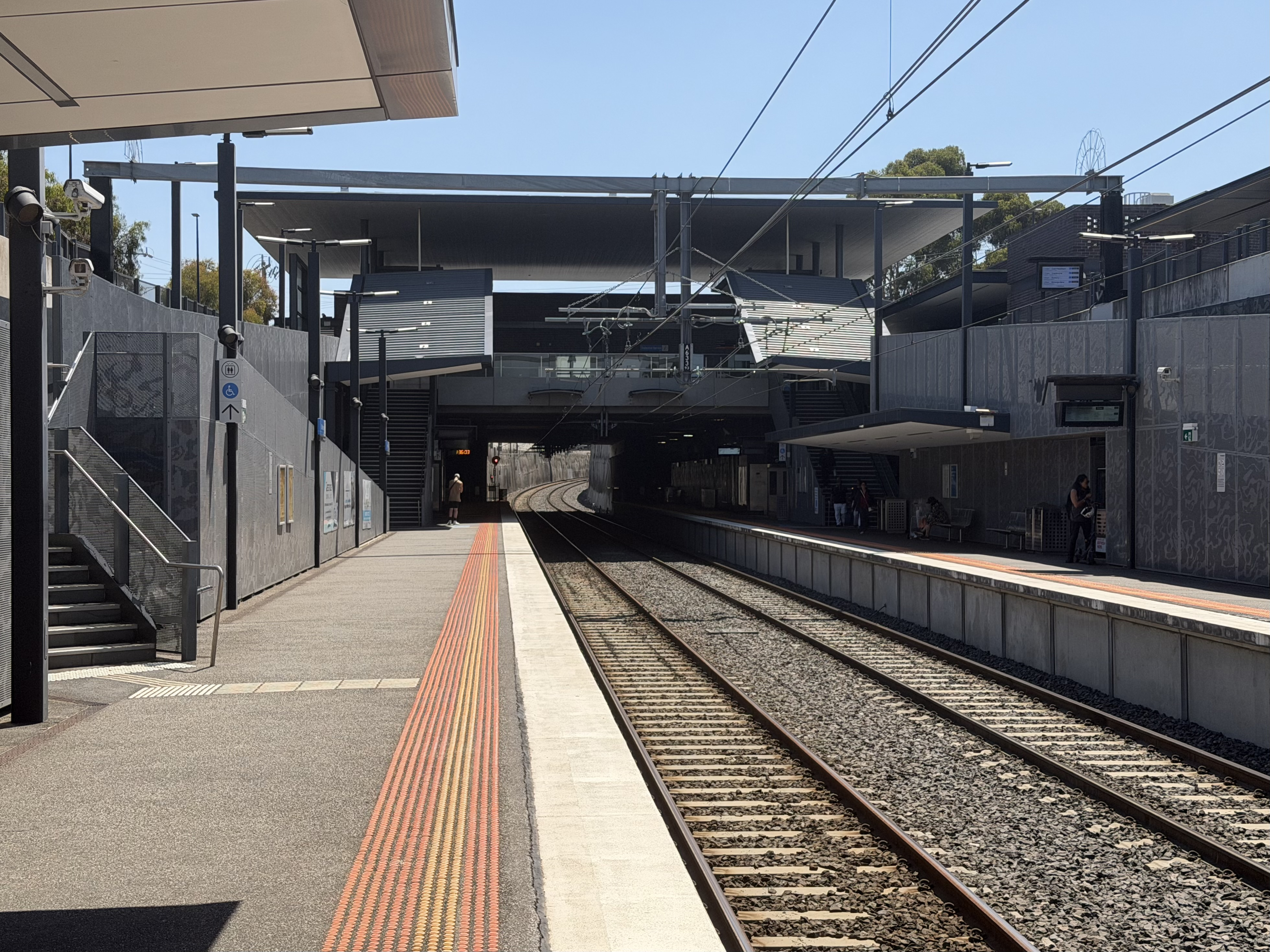
- Northbound view from Platform 2, February 2026

General information
- Location: St Albans Road, St Albans, Victoria 3021; City of Brimbank; Australia
- Coordinates: 37°44′40″S 144°47′59″E
- System: PTV commuter rail station
- Owner: VicTrack
- Operator: Metro Trains
- Line: Sunbury
- Distance: 17.81 kilometres from Southern Cross
- Platforms: 2 side (formerly 3: 1 island and 1 side)
- Tracks: 2
- Connections: Bus

Construction
- Structure type: Below ground
- Parking: 400
- Cycle facilities: Yes
- Accessible: Yes—step free access

Other information
- Status: Operational, premium station
- Station code: SAB
- Fare zone: Myki zone 2
- Website: Public Transport Victoria

History
- Opened: 1 February 1887; 139 years ago
- Rebuilt: 22 November 1959; 27 January 2002; 1 November 2016 (LXRP)
- Electrified: October 1921 (1500 V DC overhead)

Passengers
- 2005–2006: 1,207,043
- 2006–2007: 1,332,784 ▲10.41%
- 2007–2008: 1,559,537 ▲17.01%
- 2008–2009: 1,680,160 ▲7.73%
- 2009–2010: 1,796,735 ▲6.93%
- 2010–2011: 1,738,504 ▼3.24%
- 2011–2012: 1,527,953 ▼12.11%
- 2012–2013: Not measured
- 2013–2014: 997,182 ▼34.73%
- 2014–2015: 1,076,015 ▲7.9%
- 2015–2016: 1,064,315 ▼1.08%
- 2016–2017: 902,316 ▼15.22%
- 2017–2018: 1,139,678 ▲26.3%
- 2018–2019: 1,191,150 ▲4.51%
- 2019–2020: 963,000 ▼19.15%
- 2020–2021: 500,200 ▼48.05%
- 2021–2022: 610,250 ▲22%

Services
Preceding station	Metro Trains	Following station
Ginifer towards Cranbourne or East Pakenham via Metro Tunnel	Sunbury line	Keilor Plains towards Watergardens or Sunbury
Former services
Preceding station	V/Line	Following station
Ginifer towards Southern Cross	Bendigo line	Watergardens towards Sunbury or Bendigo
Track layout
Location

St Albans station is a railway station operated by Metro Trains Melbourne on the Sunbury line, part of the Melbourne network in Victoria, Australia. It serves Melbourne's western suburb of St Albans. St Albans station is below ground, features two side platforms and is a premium station, meaning it is staffed for all services. St Albans is located roughly 17 kilometres (10.56 miles), or a 30-minute train ride, from Town Hall station.

The station opened on 1 February 1887, was rebuilt in 1959 and the current iteration, a result of the Level Crossing Removal Project, opened in November 2016.

St Albans station is owned by the government agency VicTrack but is privately operated and maintained by Metro Trains Melbourne. The station is served by seven bus routes operated by CDC Melbourne.

== History ==
St Albans station opened in 1887. It was provided at the request of a land development company that was sub-dividing the area. The company manager, Alfred Padley, asked for the station to be named St Albans, apparently due to his forebears having an association with the English city of the same name.

Initially only three trains each way passed through St Albans on weekdays, and passengers had to inform the train guard at the prior stop if they wanted to alight there. On 19 November 1888, a suburban service was provided from the city, terminating at St Albans. The suburban service initially was very limited and ran from Spencer Street. As well as suburban service, a station master and post office were both provided at the station also in 1888.

In 1898, that situation was resolved, when a second crossover was added and, by 1899, three non-interlocked signals had been provided in each direction, with the first proper signal box brought into use on 17 June 1901.

In October 1921, the station became the terminus of the electrified network from the city, and services were improved – with trains operating every 40 minutes by day and hourly at night.

The original station was located at the down (outbound) end of the former Main Road level crossing, with all terminating electric trains using Platform 2. In 1959, the station was rebuilt, with an island platform built on the up (city) side of the level crossing. One side faced the main line and the other side formed a dock platform for terminating suburban trains. The old westbound platform was removed, but the eastbound platform remained for Spencer Street-bound regional trains. Train stabling sidings were also provided around that time. On 9 November 1986, manually operated boom barriers were provided at the Main Road level crossing. These replaced manual interlocking gates and were controlled from the signal box.

A signal box with a mechanical lever frame, now decommissioned, was located on the former island platform, to control access to the former back platform and sidings.

On 26 July 1996, St Albans was upgraded to a premium station, meaning it is staffed for all from first train to last, seven days a week.

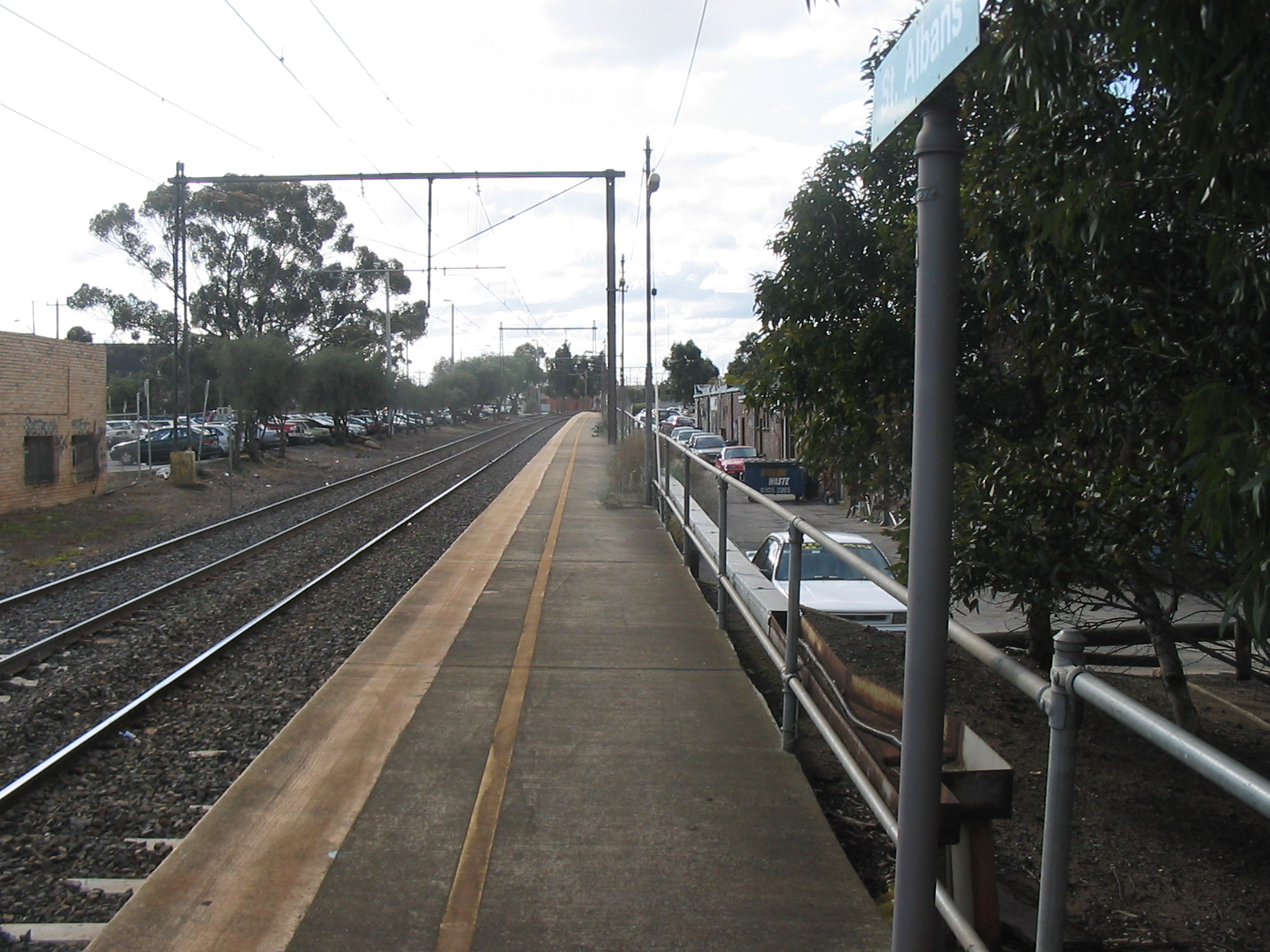
Former entrance to Platform 1 before the removal works in 2016.

In January 2002, as part of the extension of the electrified network to Watergardens, the platform previously located at the down end of the level crossing was replaced by a new platform at the up end of the level crossing.

Electric service to Sydenham commenced on 26 January 2002 with all off-peak services extended to Sydenham and stopping at the new Keilor Plains station, with select peak services continuing to terminate at St Albans.

In November 2012, after electrification of the line was extended to Sunbury, V/Line Bendigo services ceased stopping at St Albans, and Metro Trains' terminating services also ceased outside of peak hours, with Platform 3 no longer regularly used. The stabling yard was still used for train storage, until work on the grade separation project began in 2015.

As part of the grade separation project, platforms 2 & 3 along with the pebble-mix station building were demolished to make room for the construction of the new cutting and station. Platform 3 was removed in March with the track, overhead wires and the stabling sidings following shortly thereafter. The signal box and crossover on the up end were removed in May when platform 2 was demolished. After a short while of down trains running non stop through the station, a new temporary platform 2 was subsequently constructed and was used until the closure of the ground level station.

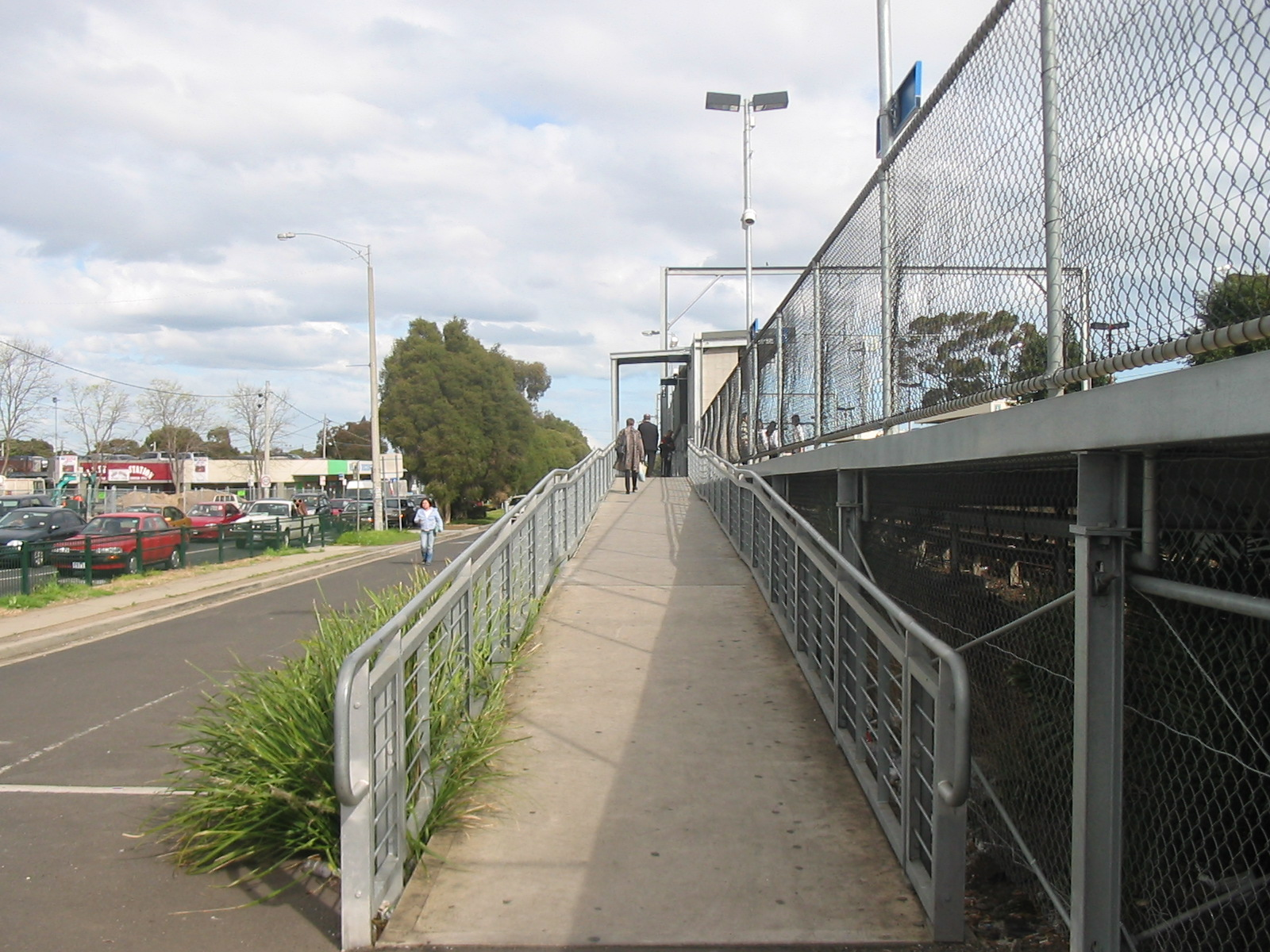
Former entrance to Platform 1 before the removal works in 2016.

The old station, as well as the line beyond Sunshine, were closed on 4 October with construction to connect the tracks in the new cuttings to the existing mainline. These works were complete on 1 November 2016, with the rebuilt station opening to the public. The overall project was completed by mid-2017. Roughly a third of the station was directly below Main Road, with the remainder also lowered.

=== Crime at the station ===
In 2009, students and workers congregated at St Albans station at night to provide protection for Indian students after a series of attacks.

In 2011 a father was stabbed in the face by youths at the station. He had asked the youths to "watch their language" as the father was present with his wife and two young children at the time. The man required facial reconstruction surgery as a result of the attack. The perpetrators, a 15 and 19 year old were arrested nearby in the aftermath.

In October 2023, videos surfaced online showing the violent bashing of several school children from St Albans Secondary College at the hands of other students from that and neighbouring schools. This incident was part of a wider string of violence perpetrated by youth across Melbourne that was filmed and uploaded.

In 2024, St Albans station was in the top-10 most crime-ridden train stations in Victoria, and along with other western suburbs locations was targeted by a police operation addressing violent crime.

== Level Crossing Removal Project ==
Up to 2001, the RACV noted St Albans station as the most congested level crossing in Melbourne for two consecutive years. In 2012 the Main Road level crossing was number four in the State government's priority list.

As part of the 2014 Victorian state election, Labor opposition leader Daniel Andrews promised to remove 50 of the most dangerous and congested level crossings across Melbourne. Labor won the 2014 election and as promised, plans for level crossing removals across Melbourne were announced. Main Road in St Albans was announced as part of the commitment in November 2014. Main Road was later joined by Furlong Road on the removal list. The business case for the grade separation project was completed and published on 7 May 2015. Main Road was cited as needing removal as between 2006 and 2014, there had been two fatalities as well as nearly 40 near misses.

Construction began in March 2015 with preliminary works including the relocation of signalling cabling, geological investigations and the installation of temporary overhead structures. Major construction work began in May 2015 with the removal of the crossover at the up (city) end alongside the stabling sidings. At this time, Platform 3 was also closed with its track and overhead removed. The loss of the stabling sidings at St Albans was compensated by the opening of new stabling sidings further down the line at Calder Park.

In October 2015, the 1959-built Platform 2 and the pebble-mix station building were demolished with trains temporarily skipping St Albans on down (Sunbury) services. A temporary Platform 2 was provided and opened in November 2015.

Digging of the new rail trench began in mid January 2016 on the former site of the bus station. During this time, Main Road was closed at the level crossing for 19 days as the future road bridge was built and jacked into place over the future trench. During April 2016, new traffic lights were installed and car parks were built alongside the railway line which would form part of the new station complex.

In August 2016, the Level Crossing Removal Project announced a November opening date for the new station with a four-week rail shutdown to commence in early October. The first parts of the new station building at St Albans were built in September, these works included the installation of lift shafts, platforms and the customer service building.

The old St Albans station alongside Ginifer and the Main Road level crossing all closed on 4 October 2016 with buses replacing trains between Sunshine and Sunbury for four weeks while works were completed to link the new trench to the existing main line. The new station was opened on 1 November 2016 while Main Road remained closed at the level crossing to resurface the road. Main Road reopened in December 2016 with the level crossing now removed permanently.

Final works were completed by mid 2017 with new shops built as part of the main building for local businesses to occupy. The new station was fully accessible with a pair of lifts and wheelchair accessible ramps to both platforms. The new station also had a customer service desk, a waiting room and public toilets.

== Platforms and services ==
St Albans has two side platforms, located below ground level. Both side platforms are connected to the station's concourse located at the northern end. Station access is via stairs and a pair of elevators to both platforms. The station is fully compliant with the Disability Discrimination Act 1992. It is served by Sunbury line trains.

A 2013 paper allocated St Albans station into the "growth star" category by having 61% passenger volume growth, and at least 1,000 weekday entries, for the period 2005–06 to 2010–11. The total indicative weekly movements in 2010-11 was 13,710.

St Albans platform arrangement
Platform	Line	Destination	Via	Service Type	Notes	Source
1	Sunbury line	Westall, Dandenong, East Pakenham or Cranbourne	Town Hall	All stations and limited express services	Services to Westall and Dandenong only operate during weekday peaks.	
2	Sunbury line	Watergardens or Sunbury		All stations		

== Transport links ==
In 2010, long bus passenger wait times for the 418 bus service of 14 and 18 minutes on Saturday and Sunday respectively were caused by buses leaving 2 minutes before the train arrived.

In 2014, the 418 and 421 bus routes were cut to make them more direct and faster between Keilor Shopping Centre and St Albans Station.

The 418 bus route from St Albans station, via Keilor Plains station, to Caroline Springs was changed in February 2021.

In 2022, the 419 and 421 bus routes that connect Watergardens station to St Albans station were described as "baffling"; both routes went through the northern suburbs but travelled in opposite directions on Apollo Road in Taylors Lakes despite going to the same destination.

In the 2026 State budget, more Sunday bus services connecting St Albans Station and Highpoint Shopping Centre were announced.

CDC Melbourne currently operates seven bus routes to and from St Albans station, under contract to Public Transport Victoria:

- 408 : to Highpoint Shopping Centre
- 418 : to Caroline Springs Square Shopping Centre
- 419 : to Watergardens station
- 421 : to Watergardens station
- 423 : to Brimbank Central Shopping Centre
- 424 : to Brimbank Central Shopping Centre
- 425 : to Watergardens station
