= Diggers Rest railway station =

Railway station in Melbourne, Australia

Diggers Rest
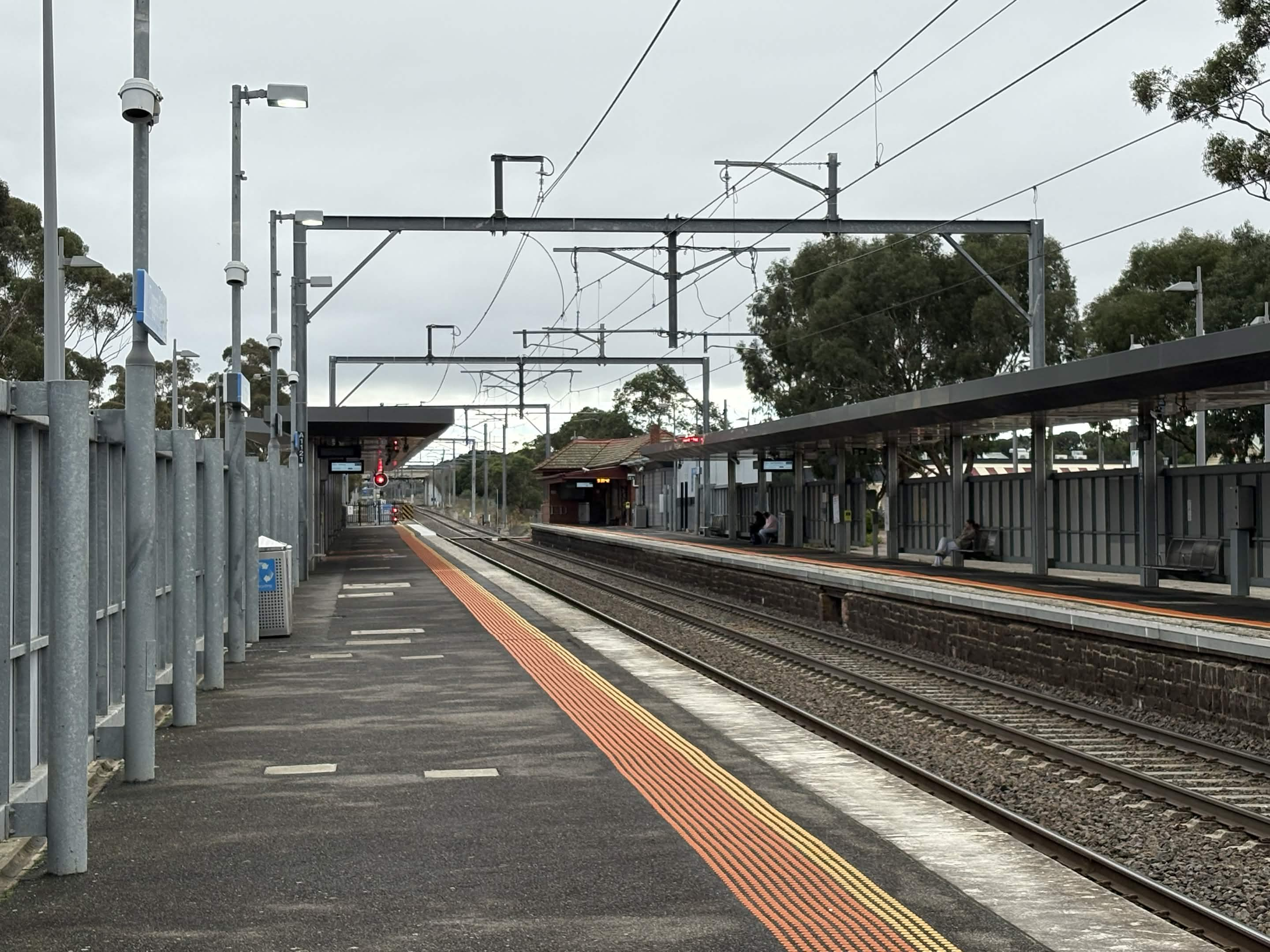
- Nortbound view from Platform 2, May 2026

General information
- Location: Old Calder Highway, Diggers Rest, Victoria 3427; City of Melton; Australia
- Coordinates: 37°37′37″S 144°43′12″E
- System: PTV commuter rail station
- Owner: VicTrack
- Operator: Metro Trains
- Line: Sunbury
- Distance: 32.69 kilometres from Southern Cross
- Platforms: 2 side
- Tracks: 2
- Connections: Bus

Construction
- Structure type: Ground
- Parking: 550
- Cycle facilities: Yes
- Accessible: Yes—step free access

Other information
- Status: Operational, unstaffed
- Station code: DIT
- Fare zone: Myki zone 2
- Website: Public Transport Victoria

History
- Opened: 2 October 1859; 166 years ago
- Rebuilt: 18 November 2012
- Electrified: August 2012 (1500 V DC overhead)

Passengers
- 2005–2006: 25,747
- 2006–2007: 31,653 ▲22.93%
- 2007–2008: 43,046 ▲35.99%
- 2008–2009: 38,448 ▼10.68%
- 2009–2010: 33,851 ▼11.95%
- 2010–2011: 31,362 ▼7.35%
- 2011–2012: 29,629 ▼5.52%
- 2012–2013: Not measured
- 2013–2014: 66,231 ▲123.53%
- 2014–2015: 87,898 ▲32.71%
- 2015–2016: 126,895 ▲44.36%
- 2016–2017: 142,588 ▲12.36%
- 2017–2018: 184,537 ▲29.42%
- 2018–2019: 221,250 ▲19.89%
- 2019–2020: 185,050 ▼16.36%
- 2020–2021: 59,350 ▼67.92%
- 2021–2022: 65,200 ▲9.85%
- 2022–2023: 129,750 ▲99%
- 2023–2024: 173,850 ▲33.99%
- 2024–2025: 165,600 ▼4.75%

Services
Preceding station	Metro Trains	Following station
Watergardens towards Cranbourne or East Pakenham via Metro Tunnel	Sunbury line	Sunbury Terminus
Former services
Preceding station	V/Line	Following station
Watergardens towards Southern Cross	Bendigo line	Sunbury Terminus
Watergardens towards Southern Cross	Bendigo line	Sunbury towards Bendigo
Track layout
Location

Diggers Rest station is a railway station operated by Metro Trains Melbourne on the Sunbury line, which is part of the Melbourne rail network. It serves the north-western suburb of Diggers Rest, in Melbourne, Victoria, Australia. Diggers Rest station is a ground level unstaffed station, featuring two side platforms. It opened on 2 October 1859, with the current station provided in 2012.

== History ==
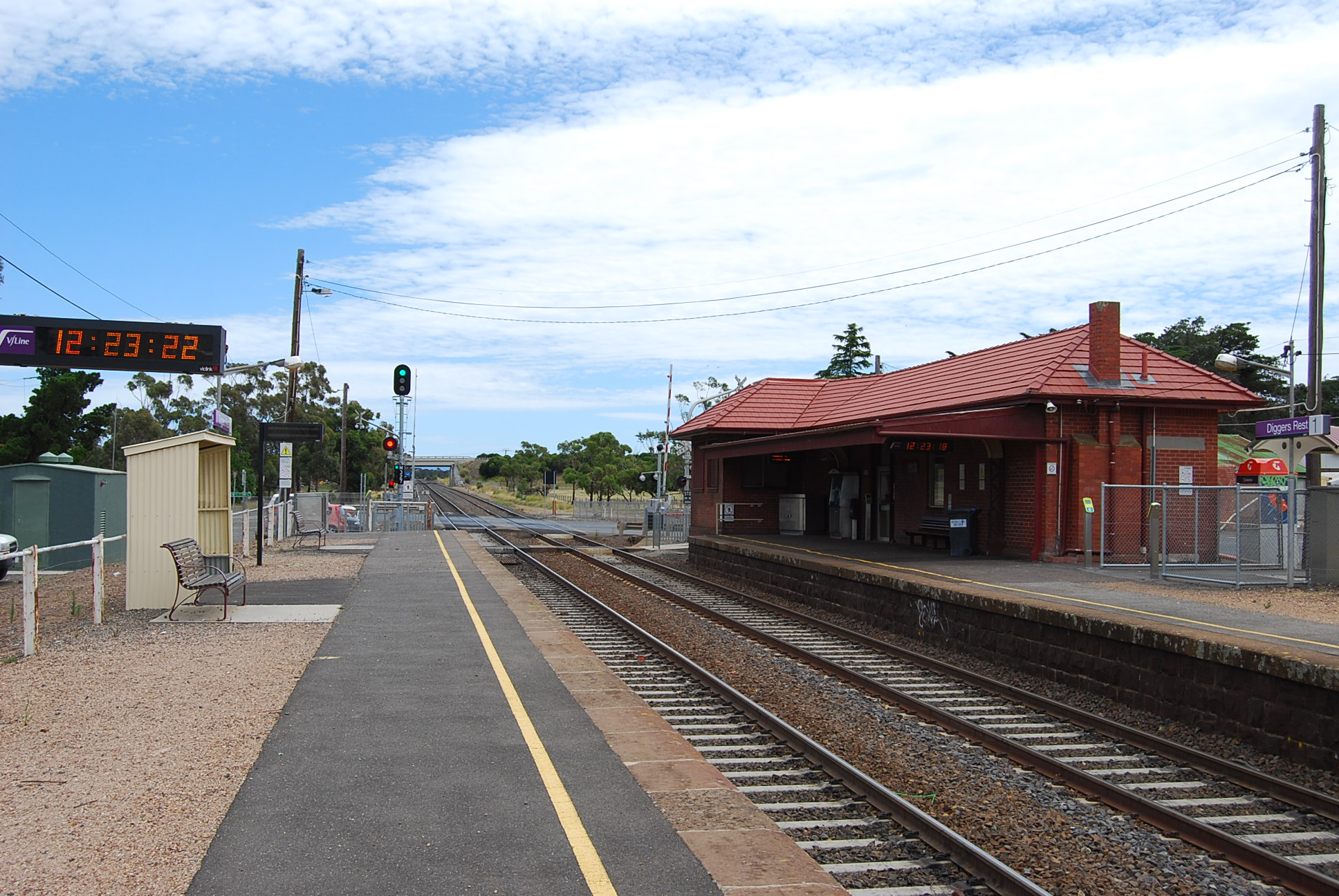
Northbound view from Platform 2, January 2010, prior to the electrification of the line

Diggers Rest opened on 2 October 1859, eight months after the railway line from Sunshine was extended to Sunbury. Like the suburb itself, the station was named after the fact that the area was used as a resting place for prospectors travelling to Bendigo during the Victorian gold rush.

At the time of opening, a small goods shed and siding were provided. In 1928, interlocked gates were provided at the Calder Highway level crossing, located at the down end of the station, and were replaced with boom barriers in 1982. In 1989, the goods siding was abolished and, in 1992, the remaining crossover was removed. The waiting room and booking lobby inside the building on Platform 1 were also provided in that year and, along with the signal box, was restored in 2002, after being damaged by fire during the previous year. On 16 April 2005, the signal box was abolished, as part of the Regional Fast Rail project.

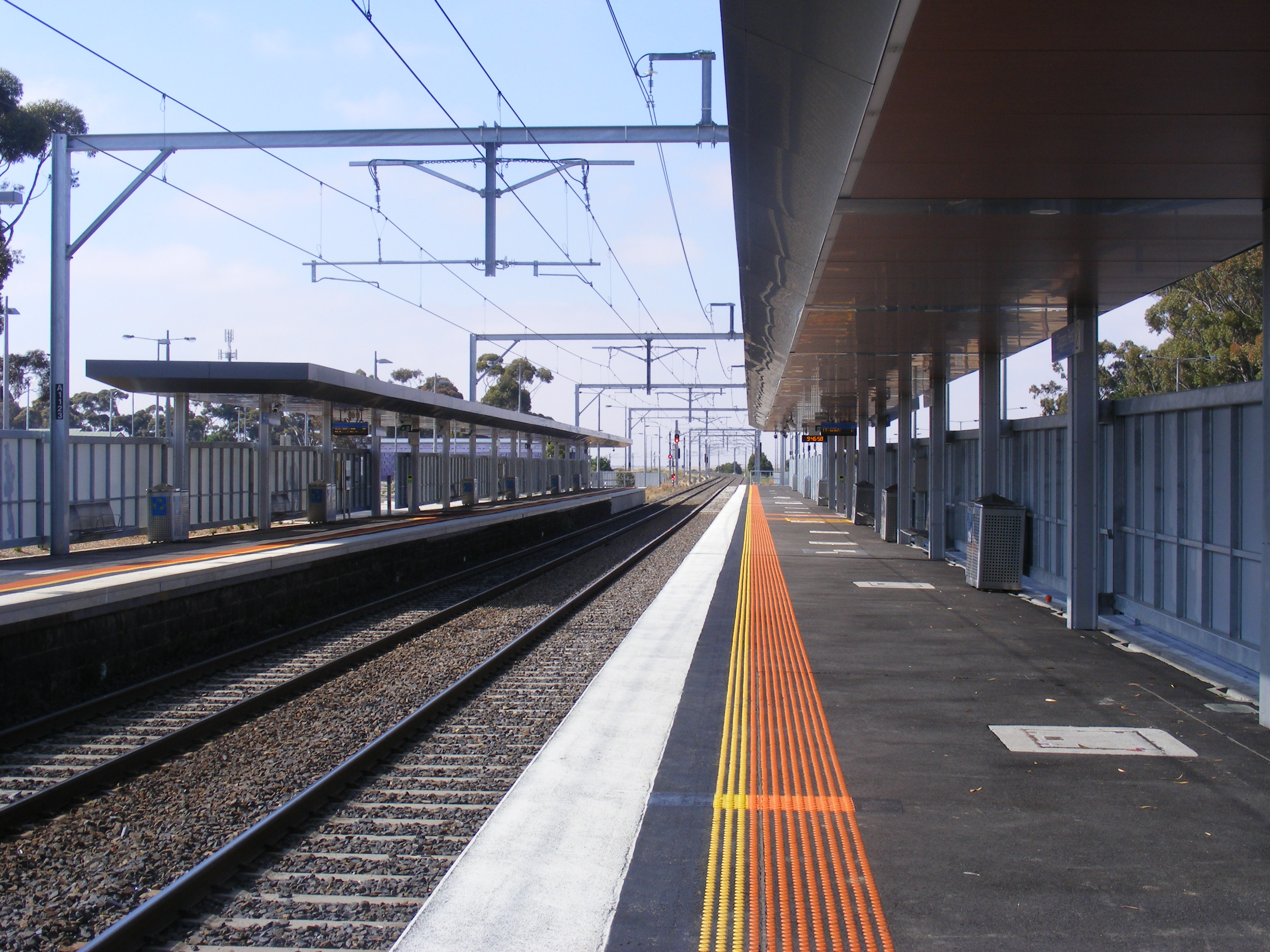
Diggers Rest Station after its rebuild in November 2012

On 18 November 2012, the station was added to the metropolitan network, when the line between Watergardens and Sunbury was electrified. As part of those works, the station was refurbished, with both platforms extended at the up (Flinders Street) end. The car park was also enlarged.

On 21 October 2022, the Level Crossing Removal Project announced that the Old Calder Highway level crossing was to be grade separated with a road over rail design. Also in that year, both platforms were extended in length, from 159 to 163 metres (522 to 535 ft).

== Platforms and services ==
Diggers Rest has two side platforms. It is served by Sunbury line trains.

Diggers Rest platform arrangement
Platform	Line	Destination	Via	Service Type	Notes	Source
1	Sunbury line	Westall, Dandenong, East Pakenham, Cranbourne	Town Hall	All stations and limited express services	Services to Westall and Dandenong only operate during weekday peaks.	
2	Sunbury line	Sunbury		All stations		

== Transport links ==
Sunbury Bus Service operates two routes via Diggers Rest station, under contract to Public Transport Victoria:

- 475 : to Sunbury station
- 483 : Sunbury station – Moonee Ponds Junction
