= Sunbury line =

Passenger rail service in metropolitan Melbourne, Victoria, Australia

Sunbury

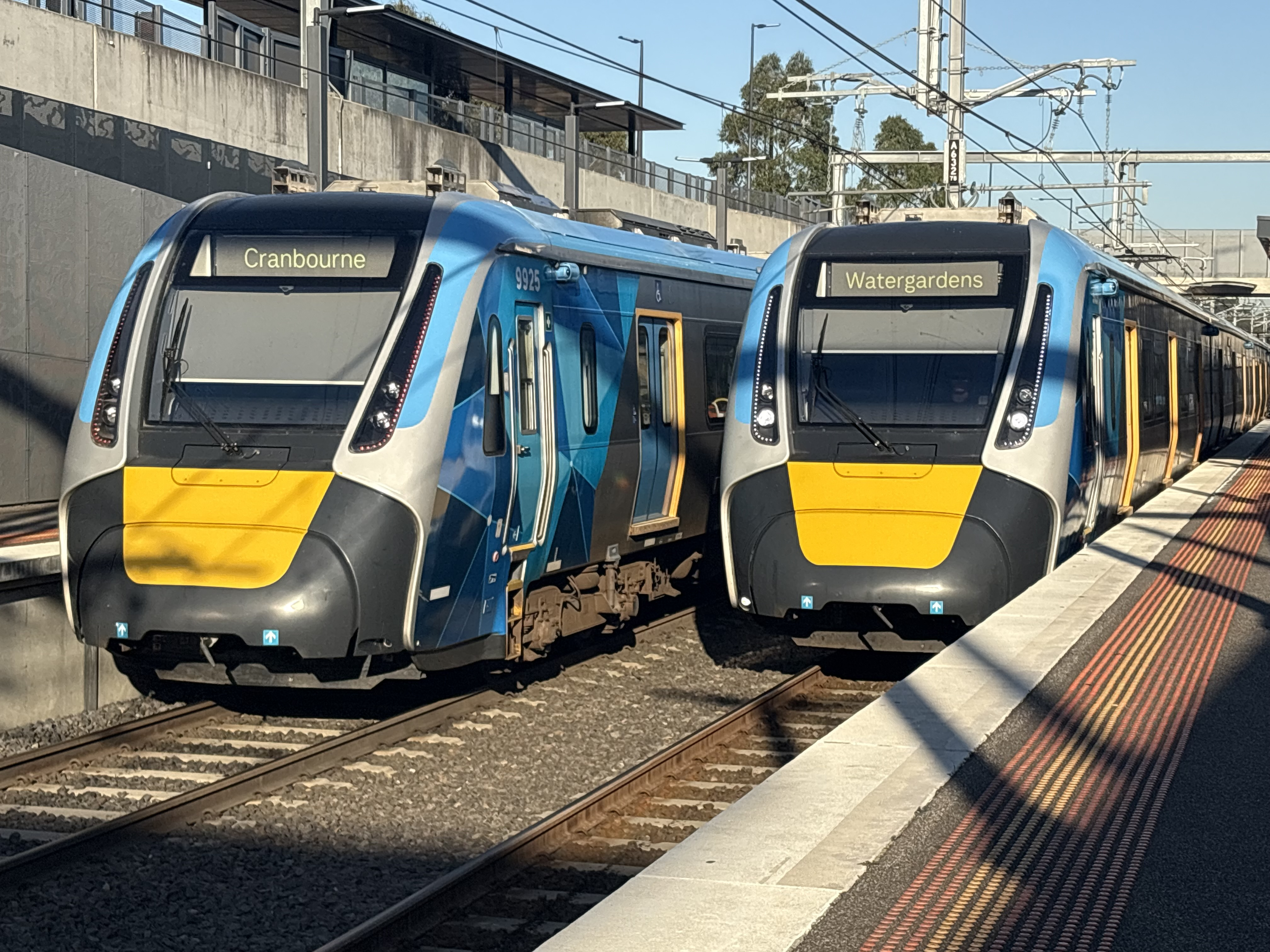
- A pair of HCMT trains cross at St Albans. HCMT trains have run all services on the Sunbury Line since February 2026.

Overview
- Service type: Commuter rail
- System: Melbourne railway network
- Status: Operational
- Locale: Melbourne, Victoria, Australia
- Predecessor: Sunbury (1859–1861); Woodend (1861–1862); Bendigo (1862–2012); St Albans ^ (1921–2002); Sydenham ^ (2002–2012)^ are electric services
- First service: 10 February 1859; 167 years ago
- Current operator: Metro Trains
- Former operators: Victorian Railways (VR) (1859–1974); VR as VicRail (1974–1983); MTA (The Met) (1983–1989); PTC (The Met) (1989–1998); Bayside Trains (1998–2000); M>Train (2000–2004); Connex Melbourne (2004–2009)

Route
- Termini: Town Hall; Sunbury
- Stops: 15
- Distance travelled: 40.3 km (25.0 mi)
- Average journey time: 49 minutes
- Service frequency: 20 minutes from Sunbury to the city; 10 minutes to and from Watergardens to the city (all day until 8pm); 10 minutes to and from West Footscray to the city (all day until last trains); 4 minutes weekday peak between Watergardens and West Footscray; Some peak services operate express, skipping Middle Footscray and Tottenham; Some peak services terminate at Watergardens or West Footscray; 60 minutes early weekend mornings
- Line used: Deniliquin

Technical
- Rolling stock: HCMT
- Track gauge: 1,600 mm (5 ft 3 in)
- Electrification: 1500 V DC overhead
- Track owner: VicTrack

The Sunbury line is a commuter railway line in the city of Melbourne, Victoria, Australia. Operated by Metro Trains Melbourne, it is the city's fifth longest metropolitan railway line at 40.3 kilometres (25.0 mi). The line runs from Town Hall station in central Melbourne to Sunbury station in the city's north-west, serving 16 stations via Parkville, Sunshine, St Albans, and Watergardens. The line operates for approximately 19 hours a day (from approximately 5:00 am to around 12:00 am) with 24 hour service available on Friday and Saturday nights. During peak hour, headways of up to 5 minutes are operated with services every 10–20 minutes during off-peak hours. Trains on the Sunbury line run with a seven-car formation operated by High Capacity Metro Trains. Since 1 February 2026, the Sunbury line has been exclusively through routed with the Pakenham and Cranbourne lines, running through the Metro Tunnel via Town Hall station.

The Victorian Railways began services in February 1859 on the line originally built to serve the town of Bendigo by the Melbourne, Mount Alexander and Murray River Railway Company. The line was progressively electrified over time, with electrification to St Albans in 1921, to Sydenham in 2002, and finally to Sunbury in 2012.

Since the 2000s, due to the heavily utilised infrastructure of the Sunbury line, improvements and upgrades have been made. Works have included replacing sleepers, upgrading signalling technology, two line extension projects, the construction of new stations, the removal of level crossings, the introduction of new rolling stock, and station accessibility upgrades.

== History ==
=== 19th century ===
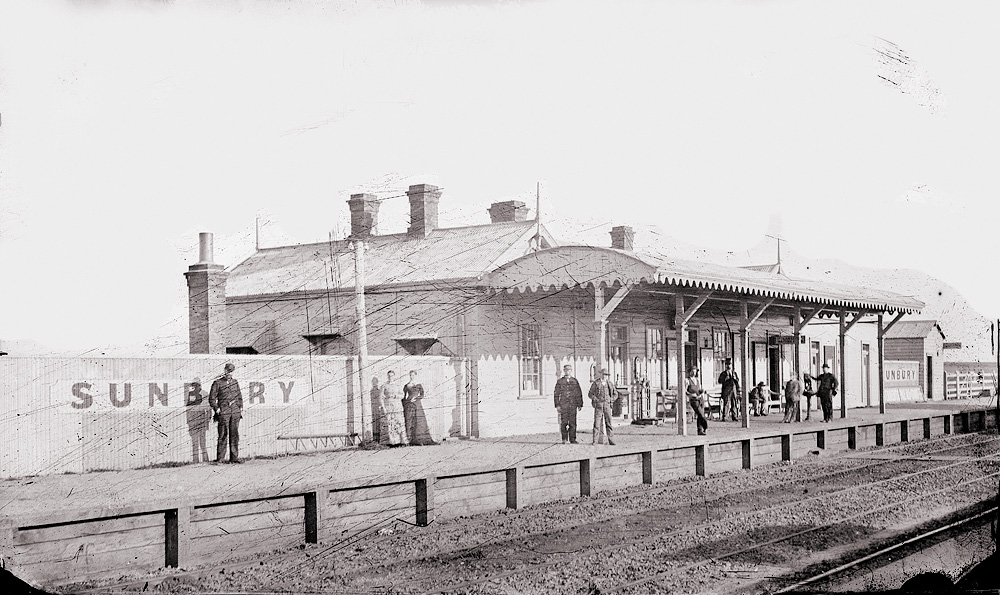
Sunbury station was opened in February 1859 as part of the rail line to Bendigo.

The Melbourne, Mount Alexander and Murray River Railway Company started to build a rail line to Bendigo before operations were taken over by the Department of Railways then the Victorian Railways. The line had been extended as far as Sunbury by February 1859. The line was duplicated between Footscray and Sunbury in early July 1859.

=== 20th century ===
Electrification of the line to St Albans was completed in October 1921, although electrification had already occurred to North Melbourne in May 1919 as part of the Essendon line electrification, and to Footscray in August 1920 as part of the Williamstown line electrification. Electrification shaved 10 minutes off the trip from St Albans to the city.

North Melbourne to South Kensington was quadruplicated in 1924, and South Kensington to Footscray in November 1976. Automatic block signalling was provided between South Kensington and Footscray (and Yarraville on the Williamstown line) in August 1927, from Footscray to West Footscray in October 1927, North Melbourne to South Kensington in June 1928, Sunshine to Albion in July 1929, West Footscray to Sunshine in October 1929, and Albion to St Albans in February 1930, thus resulting in the entire electrified line being provided with this signalling.

=== 21st century ===
==== Sydenham extension ====
On 27 January 2002, electrification of the St Albans line was extended along the regional V/Line tracks to Sydenham. The Sydenham electrification resulted in the closure of the original Sydenham station; a new station was built 600 metres south and named after the nearby Watergardens Town Centre. Additionally, another station was constructed in St Albans called Keilor Plains.

==== Sunbury extension ====
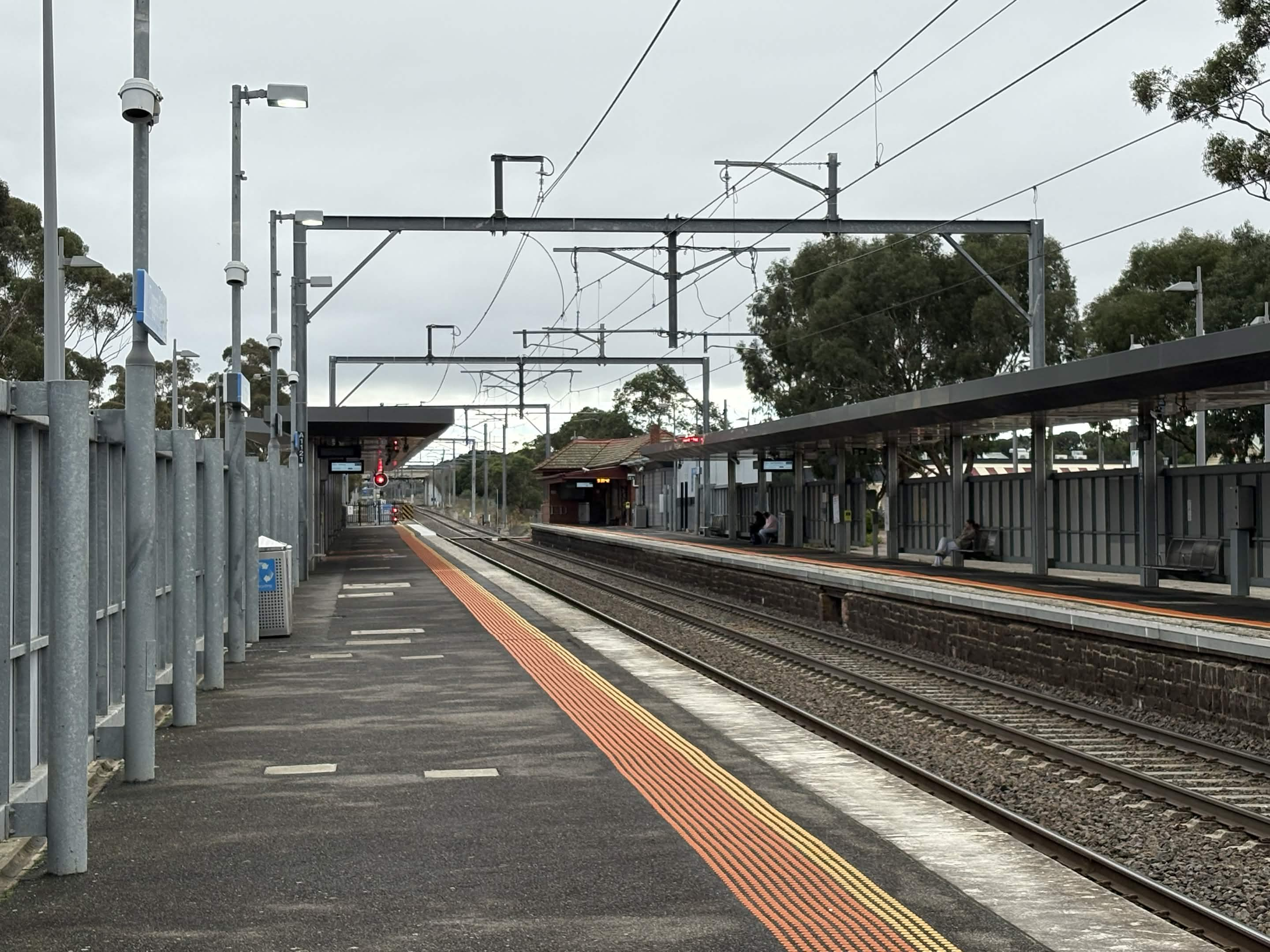
Diggers Rest station was heavily upgraded as part of the extension.

Proposals for an extension of electrified metropolitan services to Sunbury had dated as far back as the 1969 Melbourne Transportation Plan. $270 million was set aside to complete electrification works as part of the 2008 Victorian Transport Plan, with works completed in 2012.

There was some opposition to electrification. Concerns included a less comfortable journey, the removal of toilet facilities, the presence of a conductor, potential overcrowding, and congestion at level crossings due to the increase in the number of services. Bendigo line users also raised concern that electrification to Sunbury would slow down their trains to Melbourne. Ian Dobbs, then head of Public Transport Victoria acknowledged this issue, stating that "there's a slight slow-down of services on that particular corridor with this timetable, because we're putting more Metro services in the mix."

On 18 November 2012, the newly electrified line was renamed from the Sydenham line to the Sunbury line. Completion of the electrification increased the service frequency of Sunbury and Diggers Rest stations to 489 trains per week, an increase of 64% from the 298 trains per week when the service was operated by V/Line.

==== Sunbury Line Upgrade ====
In 2019, works began on the $2.1 billion Sunbury Line Upgrade project, delivered by the Rail Projects Victoria. The project upgraded the line to support the introduction of High Capacity Metro Train (HCMT) rolling stock and "take full advantage of the extra capacity created by the Metro Tunnel" which opened in 2025.

Works delivered as part of the project include the installation of five new electrical substations: one in Delahey (near Watergardens station), one in Calder Park, rail yard two in St Albans, and one in Albion; ten more across the line were upgraded along with improvements to overhead wiring and signalling equipment to enable the use of "high capacity signalling" (a form of communications-based train control) in the Metro Tunnel. Platforms were extended at Sunbury, Watergardens, Albion, Sunshine, Tottenham, West Footscray, Middle Footscray, and Footscray stations to support the longer HCMT rolling stock. Raised boarding pads were installed at Sunbury, Diggers Rest, Watergardens, Keilor Plains, Albion, Sunshine, and Footscray stations to improve wheelchair accessibility. Train stabling facilities at Sunbury, Calder Park, and Watergardens were upgraded, the level crossing at Gap Road, Sunbury was removed, and the tracks connecting the Sunbury line to the Metro Tunnel's portal at South Kensington station were laid.

=== Metro Tunnel ===
The map of the Metro Tunnel route through the Melbourne central business district.

The 2012 Network Development Plan identified the need for a north–south tunnel connecting the Sunbury line to the Cranbourne and Pakenham lines. In 2017, the Metro Tunnel project began construction, consisting of twin 9-kilometre (5.6 mi) tunnels bored underground between South Kensington and South Yarra stations, with five new stations along the route: Arden, Parkville, State Library (connecting to Melbourne Central), Town Hall (connecting to Flinders Street), and Anzac. These works were completed in 2025, and went fully operational following the timetable change on 1 February 2026.

=== Level crossing removals ===
The Level Crossing Removal Project has announced the removal of all 7 remaining level crossings on the Sunbury line, completed in stages from 2016 to 2025. In 2016, the level crossings at Furlong Road and Main Road, St Albans, were removed by lowering the rail line into a trench under the roads; St Albans and Ginifer stations were rebuilt. Another crossing was removed by elevating a section of the Melton Highway in Sydenham onto a bridge above the rail line in 2018. All remaining level crossings on the line were removed in 2025. The crossings at Old Calder Highway, Watsons Road, and Calder Park Drive were removed by building road bridges over the rail line, and the Holden Road crossing was closed to car traffic.

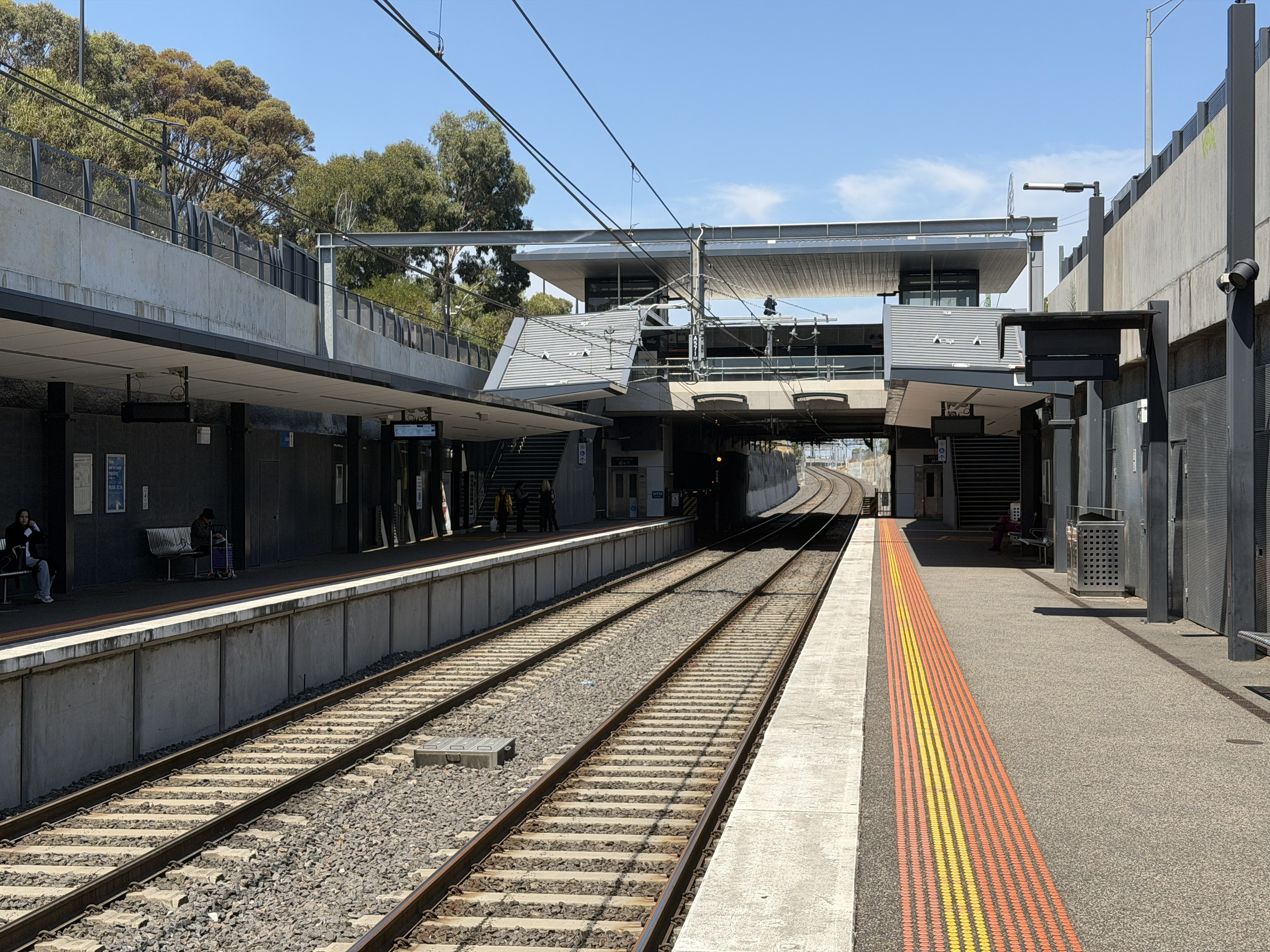
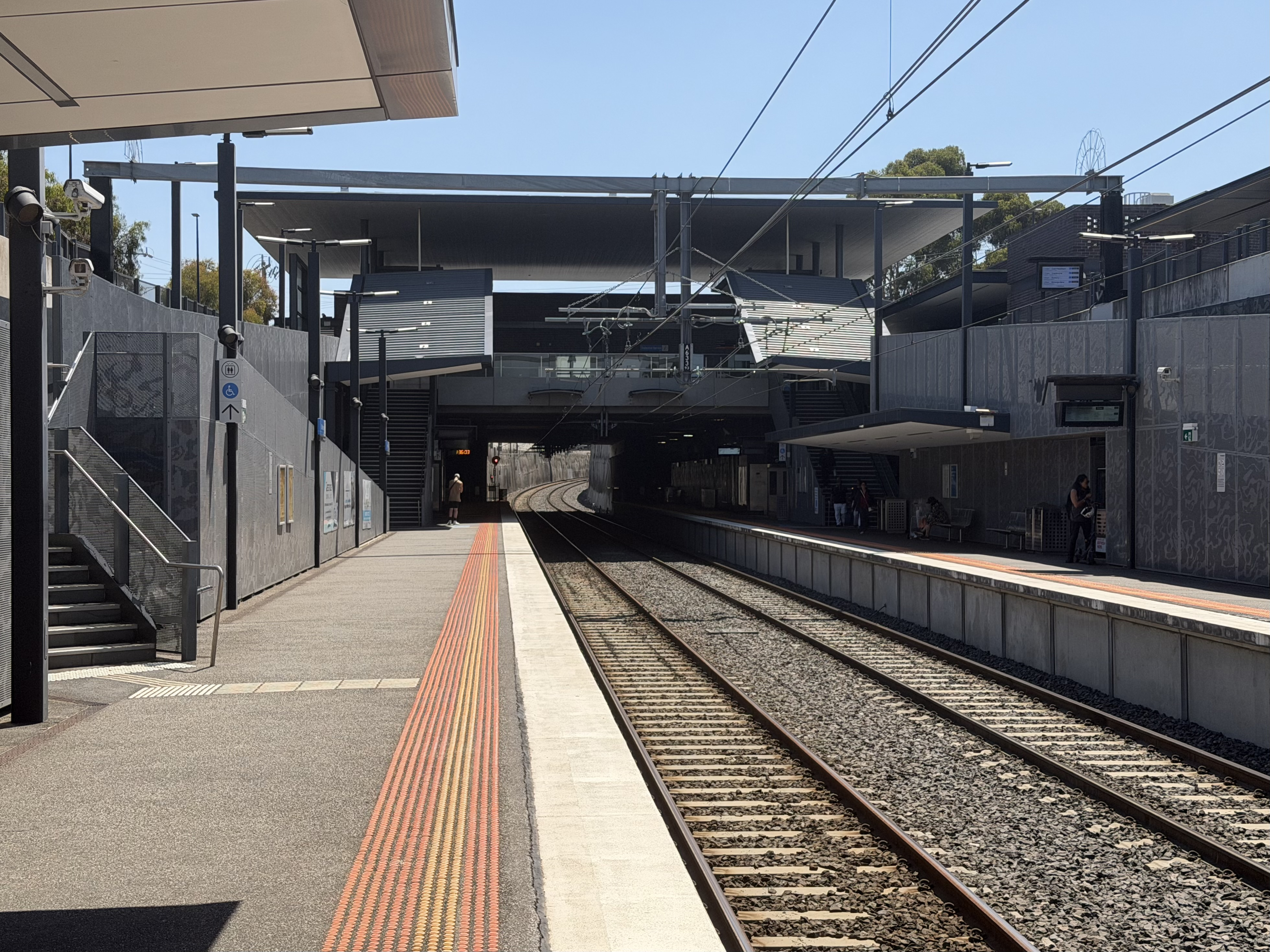
Ginifer and St Albans stations were rebuilt during the removal of the Furlong Road level crossing.

=== Infill Stations ===
Currently, There is only one station proposed to be built on the Sunbury Line being at Calder Park. The station is planned to be located adjacent to Calder Park Drive.

== Network and operations ==
=== Services ===
Services on the Sunbury line operate from approximately 4:00 am to around 1:00 am daily. In general, during peak hours, train frequency is 5–10 minutes in the AM peak on the Sunbury line while during non-peak hours the frequency is reduced to 10-20 minutes throughout the entire route. Frequency varies between different parts of the route, with some trains terminating or originating from Watergardens and West Footscray. On Friday and Saturday nights, services run 24 hours a day, with 60 minute frequencies available outside of normal operating hours.

Train services on the Sunbury line are also subjected to maintenance and renewal works, usually on selected Fridays and Saturdays. Shuttle bus services are provided throughout the duration of works for affected commuters.

==== Stopping patterns ====
Legend — Station status

- ◼ Premium Station – Station staffed from first to last train
- ◻ Host Station – Usually staffed during morning peak, however this can vary for different stations on the network.

Legend — Stopping patterns

All operate via the Metro Tunnel

- ● – All trains stop
- ◐ – Some services do not stop
- | – Trains pass and do not stop

Services continue beyond Town Hall towards Cranbourne or East Pakenham stations.

During night network, all services will run express from Footscray to Town Hall and vice versa.

Sunbury Services
Station	Zone	Local	Ltd Express	Watergardens	West Footscray
◼ Town Hall	1	●	●	●	●
◼ State Library	1	◐	●	●	●
◼ Parkville	1	◐	●	●	●
◼ Arden	1	◐	●	●	●
◼ Footscray	1	●	●	●	●
Middle Footscray	1	●	|	●	●
West Footscray	1	●	●	●	●
Tottenham	1	●	|	●	
◼ Sunshine	1/2	●	●	●	
◻ Albion	1/2	●	●	●	
Ginifer	2	●	●	●	
◼ St Albans	2	●	●	●	
Keilor Plains	2	●	●	●	
◼ Watergardens	2	●	●	●	
Diggers Rest	2	●	●		
◼ Sunbury	2	●	●		

=== Operators ===
The Sunbury line has had a total of 7 operators since its opening in 1859. The majority of operations throughout its history have been government run: from its first service in 1859 until the 1999 privatisation of Melbourne's rail network, four different government operators have run the line. These operators, Victorian Railways, the Metropolitan Transit Authority, the Public Transport Corporation, and Bayside Trains have a combined operational length of 141 years.

Bayside Trains was privatised in August 1999 and later rebranded M>Train. In 2002, M>Train was placed into receivership and the state government regained ownership of the line, with KPMG appointed as receivers to operate M>Train on behalf of the state government. Two years later, rival train operator Connex Melbourne took over the M>Train operations including the Sunbury line. Metro Trains Melbourne, the current private operator, then took over the operations in 2009. The private operators have had a combined operational period of 26 years.

Past and present operators of the Sunbury line:
Operator	Assumed operations	Ceased operations	Length of operations
Victorian Railways	1859	1983	124 years
Metropolitan Transit Authority	1983	1989	6 years
Public Transport Corporation	1989	1998	9 years
Bayside Trains (government operator)	1998	2000	2 years
M>Train	2000	2004	4 years
Connex Melbourne	2004	2009	5 years
Metro Trains Melbourne	2009	incumbent	16 years (ongoing)

=== Route ===
Interactive map of the Sunbury line in north-western Melbourne.

The Sunbury line forms a relatively linear route from the Melbourne central business district to its terminus in Sunbury. The route is 40.3 kilometres (25.0 mi) long and is fully double-tracked from Town Hall to its terminus. The only underground section of the Sunbury line is in the Metro Tunnel, where the service stops at 4 underground stations. Exiting the city, the Sunbury line traverses mainly flat country, except on the west bank of the Maribyrnong River where it requires some moderately heavy earthworks. The line is paralleled by a double-track goods line and the interstate standard gauge line, the latter being dual gauge with the goods line to West Footscray. The goods line joins the Sunbury line at Sunshine, whilst the standard gauge line to Sydney continues to run alongside the suburban line to Albion, where it and a goods line head off in a north-easterly direction. Some sections of the line have been elevated or lowered into a cutting to eliminate level crossings.

=== Stations ===
The line serves 16 stations across 40.3 kilometres (25.0 mi) of track. The stations are a mix of elevated, lowered, underground, and ground level designs. Underground stations are present only in the City Loop, with the majority of elevated and lowered stations being constructed as part of level crossing removals. From 2026, services ceased to stop at Southern Cross, Flagstaff, Melbourne Central, Parliament, and North Melbourne stations due to the opening of the Metro Tunnel.

Station	Image	Accessibility	Opened	Terrain	Train connections	Other connections
Town Hall		Yes—step free access	2025	Underground	16 connections: Alamein line; Belgrave line; Craigieburn line; Cranbourne line; Flemington Racecourse line; Frankston line; Gippsland line; Glen Waverley line; Hurstbridge line; Lilydale line; Mernda line; Pakenham line; Sandringham line; Upfield line; Werribee line; Williamstown line	Trains Trams
State Library		Yes—step free access	2025	Underground	11 connections: Alamein line; Belgrave line; Craigieburn line; Cranbourne line; Frankston line; Glen Waverley line; Hurstbridge line; Lilydale line; Mernda line; Pakenham line; Upfield line	Trains Trams
Parkville		Yes—step free access	2025	Underground	2 connections: Cranbourne line; Pakenham line	Trams Buses
Arden		Yes—step free access	2025	Underground	2 connections: Cranbourne line; Pakenham line	Buses
Footscray		Yes—step free access	1859	Ground level	10 connections: Ararat line; Ballarat line; Bendigo line; Echuca line; Geelong line; Maryborough line; Swan Hill line; Warrnambool line; Werribee line; Williamstown line	Trams Buses
Middle Footscray		No—steep ramp	1906	Ground level		Buses
West Footscray		Yes—step free access	1888	Ground level		Buses
Tottenham		No—steep ramp	1891	Elevated		
Sunshine		Yes—step free access	1885	Ground level	4 connections: Ararat line; Ballarat line; Geelong line; Maryborough line	Buses SkyBus
Albion		No—steep ramp	1860	Ground level		Buses
Ginifer		Yes—step free access	1982	Below ground		Buses
St Albans		Yes—step free access	1887	Below ground		Buses
Keilor Plains		Yes—step free access	2002	Ground level		Buses
Watergardens		Yes—step free access	1859	Ground level	2 connections: Bendigo line; Swan Hill line	Buses
Diggers Rest		Yes—step free access	1859	Ground level		Buses
Sunbury		Yes—step free access	1859	Ground level	2 connections: Bendigo line; Echuca line	Buses Coaches

Station histories
Station	Opened	Closed	Age	Notes
Flagstaff	27 May 1985		41 years	Since 2026, services ceased serving the station due to the opening of the Metro Tunnel
Melbourne Central	26 January 1981		45 years	Since 2026, services ceased serving the station due to the opening of the Metro Tunnel; Formerly Museum
Parliament	22 January 1983		43 years	Since 2026, services ceased serving the station due to the opening of the Metro Tunnel
Flinders Street	12 September 1854		172 years	Formerly Melbourne Terminus
Southern Cross	17 January 1859		167 years	Since 2026, services ceased serving the station due to the opening of the Metro Tunnel; Formerly Batman's Hill; Formerly Spencer Street
North Melbourne	6 October 1859		167 years	Since 2026, services ceased serving the station due to the opening of the Metro Tunnel
South Kensington	11 March 1891		135 years	Not a stop since 2013
Saltwater River	1 October 1859	c. 1867	Approx. 8 years	
Footscray	24 September 1900		126 years	
Middle Footscray	10 February 1859	24 September 1900	41 years	1st site; Formerly Footscray (Main line)
Middle Footscray	10 December 1906	2 July 1927	20 years	2nd site
Middle Footscray	3 July 1927		99 years	3rd site
West Footscray	1 October 1888		138 years	Formerly Footscray West
Tottenham	2 March 1891		135 years	
White City	10 December 1927	4 October 1981	53 years	
Maidstone	2 March 1861	1 April 1865	4 years	
Sunshine	7 September 1885		141 years	Formerly Braybrook Junction
Albion	5 January 1860	1 January 1861	11 months	1st site; Was originally Albion and Darlington
Albion	24 March 1891	24 November 1919	28 years	1st site; Reopened as Albion
Albion	24 November 1919		106 years	2nd site
Ginifer	31 October 1982		44 years	
St Albans	1 February 1887	22 November 1959	72 years	1st site
St Albans	22 November 1959		66 years	2nd site
Keilor Plains	11 September 2002		24 years	
Watergardens	1 March 1859	11 September 2002	143 years	Was originally Keilor Road; Later Sydenham
Watergardens	11 September 2002		24 years	Reopened as Watergardens
Holden	5 January 1860	1 January 1861	11 months	
Diggers Rest	2 October 1859		167 years	
Sunbury	10 February 1859		167 years	
Rupertswood	1879	?		Private platform for William John Clarke
Rupertswood	Between 1909 and 1913	3 November 1941	28–32 years	
Rupertswood	7 February 1962	2004	42 years	

==== Pre Metro Tunnel stations ====
Station	Accessibility	Opened	Terrain	Train connections	Other connections	Notes
Flinders Street	Yes—step free access	1854	Lowered	16 connections: Alamein line; Belgrave line; Craigieburn line; Flemington Racecourse line; Frankston line; Gippsland line; Glen Waverley line; Hurstbridge line; Lilydale line; Mernda line; Pakenham line; Sandringham line; Sunbury line; Upfield line; Werribee line; Williamstown line	Trams Buses	
Southern Cross	Yes—step free access	1859	Ground level	27 connections: Alamein line; Albury line; Ararat line; Ballarat line; Belgrave line; Bendigo line; Craigieburn line; Echuca line; Flemington Racecourse line; Geelong line; Gippsland line; Glen Waverley line; Hurstbridge line; Lilydale line; Maryborough line; Mernda line; NSW TrainLink Southern; Pakenham line; Seymour line; Shepparton line; Sunbury line; Swan Hill line; The Overland; Upfield line; Warrnambool line; Werribee line; Williamstown line	Trams Buses Coaches SkyBus	
Flagstaff	Yes—step free access	1985	Underground	10 connections: Alamein line; Belgrave line; Craigieburn line; Glen Waverley line; Hurstbridge line; Lilydale line; Mernda line; Pakenham line; Sunbury line; Upfield line	Trams	
Melbourne Central	Yes—step free access	1981	Underground	10 connections: Alamein line; Belgrave line; Craigieburn line; Glen Waverley line; Hurstbridge line; Lilydale line; Mernda line; Pakenham line; Sunbury line; Upfield line	Trams Buses	
Parliament	Yes—step free access	1983	Underground	10 connections: Alamein line; Belgrave line; Craigieburn line; Glen Waverley line; Hurstbridge line; Lilydale line; Mernda line; Pakenham line; Sunbury line; Upfield line	Trams	
North Melbourne	Yes—step free access	1859	Ground level	7 connections: Craigieburn line; Flemington Racecourse line; Seymour line; Shepparton line; Upfield line; Werribee line; Williamstown line	Buses	

== Infrastructure ==
=== Rolling stock ===
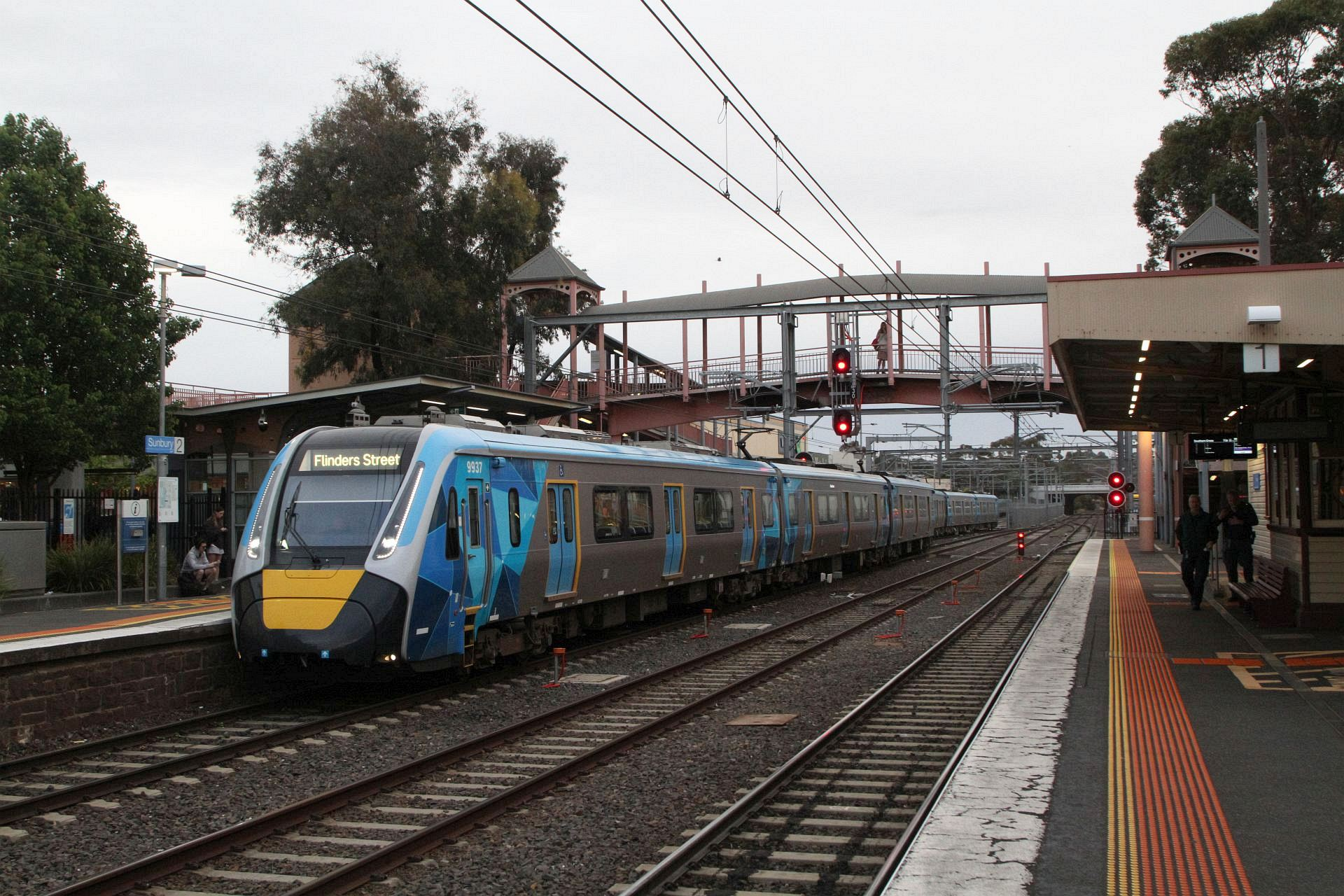
High Capacity Metro Trains (HCMT) have operated exclusively on the Sunbury line since February 2026

Since the full opening of the Metro Tunnel in 2026, the Sunbury line has exclusively used a fleet of High Capacity Metro Train (HCMT) electric multiple unit trains, operating in a seven-car configuration. The trains feature three doors per side on each carriage and can accommodate up to 1,380 passengers. HCMTs were introduced to the Sunbury line in 2023, operating two peak services from Sunbury to Flinders Street each morning. HCMTs are also planned to be used on the Airport line, which will branch off from the Sunbury line at Sunshine. HCMTs are built in Changchun, China, with final assembly occurring in Newport, Melbourne, by Evolution Rail, a consortium composed of CRRC Changchun Railway Vehicles, Downer Rail and Plenary Group. In October 2023, two HCMT services ran per day on the Sunbury Line, with more gradually introduced in the following years. From 1 February 2026, all services on the Sunbury Line are taken by HCMT stock following the full operation of the Metro Tunnel.

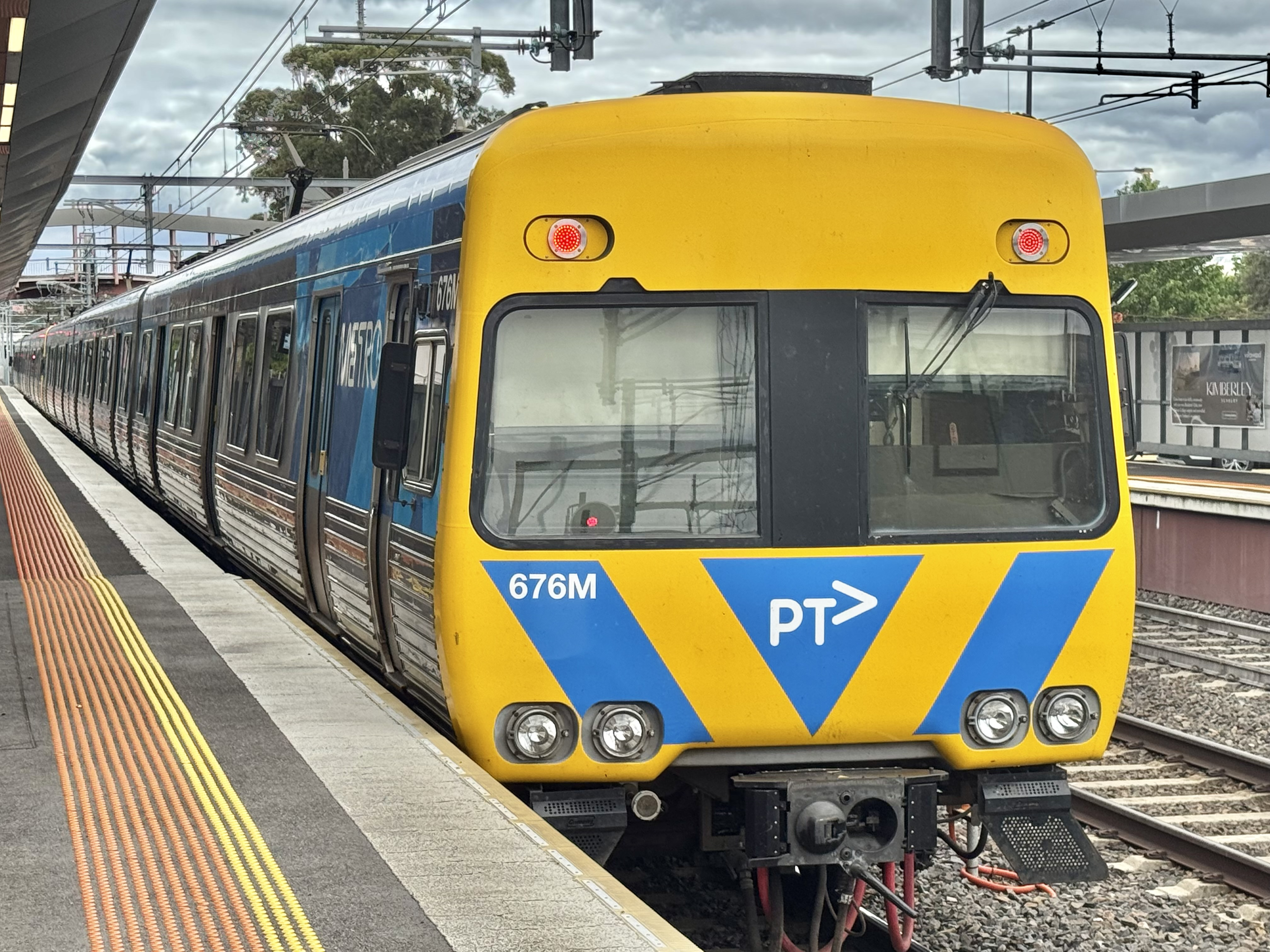
The Comeng trains were one of the former rollingstock for the Sunbury line until the High Capacity Metro Trains took over full operations in February 2026

Previously, the Sunbury line was served by a fleet of Comeng and Siemens Nexas trains. Most of the oldest Comeng trains (stage 1 and some stage 2) have been decommissioned and scrapped as part of the HCMT takeover. However, a number of these trains have been reallocated onto other Melbourne metropolitan lines. In comparison, the Siemens Nexas trains have not been retired, instead being moved onto other lines to replace older Comeng sets. Since February 2026, the Sunbury line is exclusively operated by High Capacity Metro Trains.

Alongside the passenger trains, Sunbury line tracks and equipment are maintained by a fleet of engineering trains. The four types of engineering trains are: the shunting train; designed for moving trains along non-electrified corridors and for transporting other maintenance locomotives, for track evaluation; designed for evaluating track and its condition, the overhead inspection train; designed for overhead wiring inspection, and the infrastructure evaluation carriage designed for general infrastructure evaluation. Most of these trains are repurposed locomotives previously used by V/Line, Metro Trains Melbourne, and Southern Shorthaul Railroad.

=== Accessibility ===
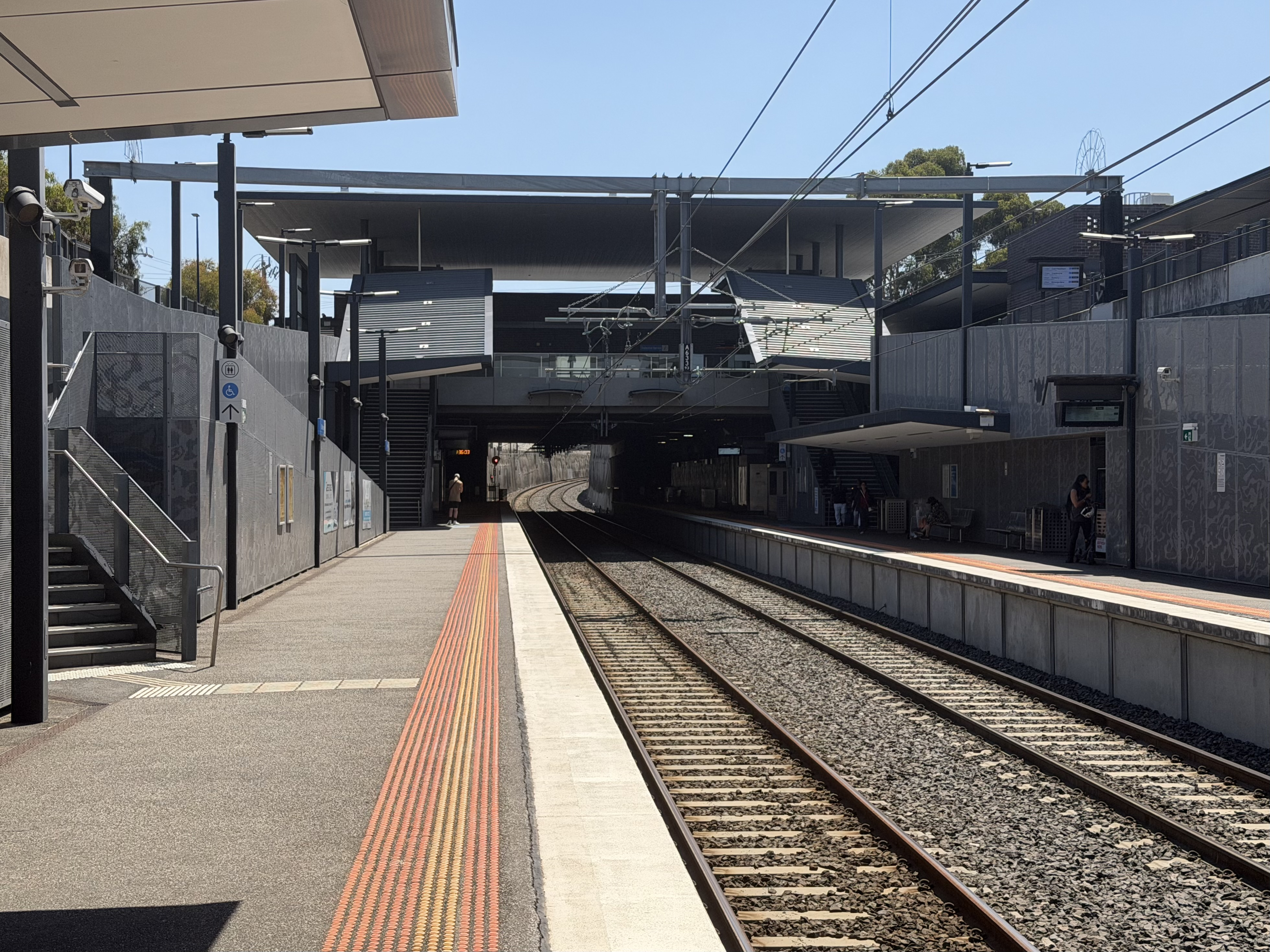
St Albans station features wheelchair accessible ramps and elevators.

In compliance with the Disability Discrimination Act of 1992, all stations that were newly built or rebuilt since the Act took effect comply with its guidelines. Most stations on the Sunbury line are fully accessible, however, there are some stations that have not been upgraded to meet these guidelines. Stations that are fully accessible feature ramps that have a gradient less than 1 in 14, have at-grade paths, or feature elevators. Accessible stations typically also feature tactile boarding indicators, independent boarding ramps, wheelchair accessible myki barriers, hearing loops, and widened paths.

Several stations on the Sunbury line have been rebuilt or upgraded with better accessibility features, mostly as part of the Level Crossing Removal Project and the Sunbury Line Upgrade. This includes St Albans and Ginifer stations, which were rebuilt as part of the Level Crossing Removal Project; and Sunbury, Diggers Rest, Watergardens, Keilor Plains, Albion, Sunshine, and Footscray stations which had raised boarding pads installed to improve wheelchair accessibility as part of the Sunbury Line Upgrade.

=== Signalling ===
The Sunbury line uses three-position signalling which is widely used across the Melbourne train network. Three-position signalling was first introduced in 1929, with the final section of the line converted in 2005. The Sunbury line's signalling system was further upgraded between West Footscray and the western entrance of the Metro Tunnel as part of the Sunbury Line Upgrade to enable the use of "high capacity signalling" (a form of communications-based train control) to be used within the Metro Tunnel.
