= Keilor Plains railway station =

Railway station in Melbourne, Australia

Keilor Plains
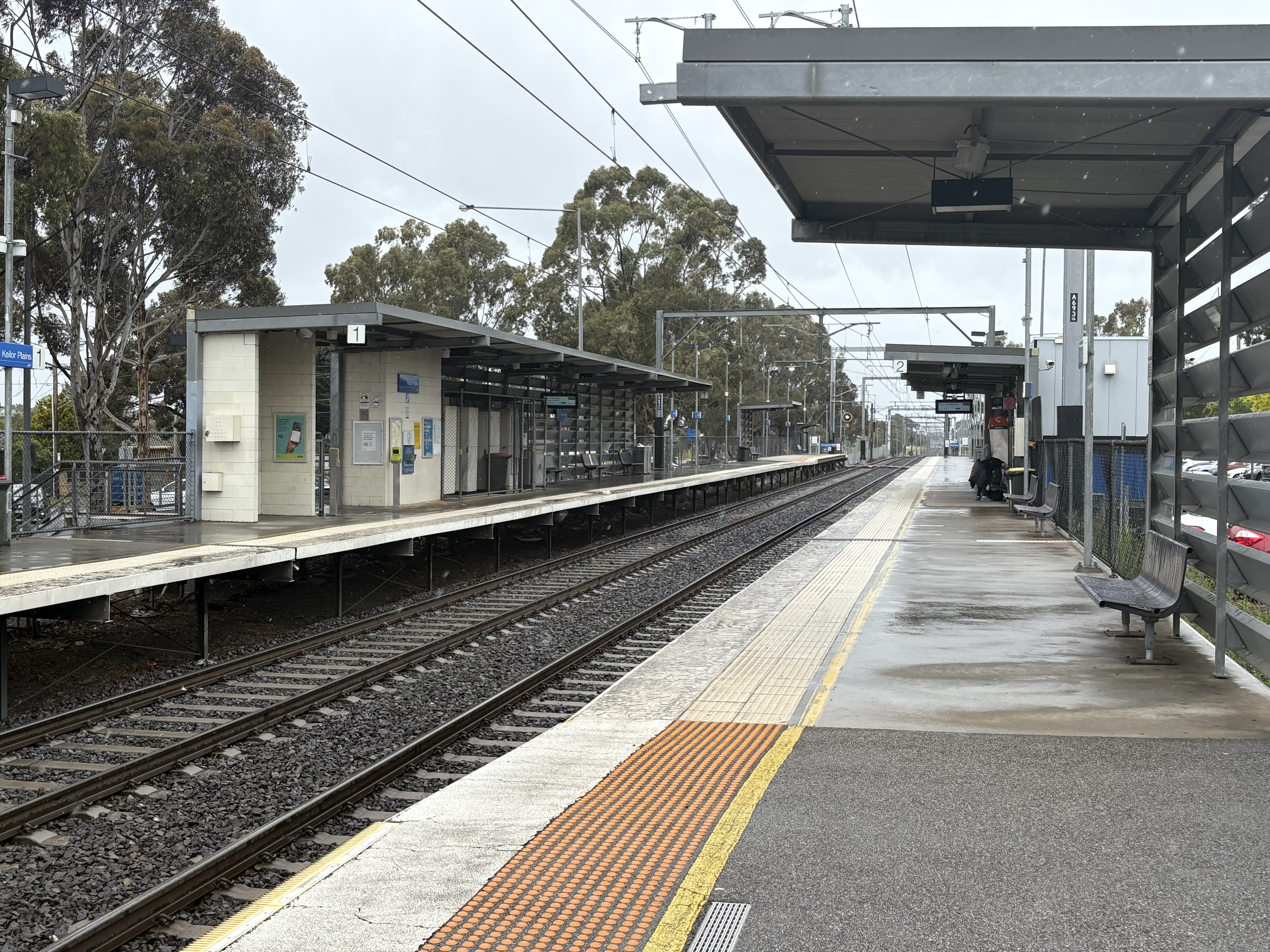
- Southbound view from Platform 2, November 2025

General information
- Location: East Esplanade, St Albans, Victoria 3021; City of Brimbank; Australia
- Coordinates: 37°43′46″S 144°47′38″E
- System: PTV commuter rail station
- Owner: VicTrack
- Operator: Metro Trains
- Line: Sunbury
- Distance: 19.50 kilometres from Southern Cross
- Platforms: 2 side
- Tracks: 2
- Connections: Bus

Construction
- Structure type: Ground
- Parking: 450
- Cycle facilities: Yes
- Accessible: Yes—step free access

Other information
- Status: Operational, unstaffed
- Station code: KPL
- Fare zone: Myki zone 2
- Website: Public Transport Victoria

History
- Opened: 27 January 2002; 24 years ago
- Electrified: January 2002 (1500 V DC overhead)

Passengers
- 2005–2006: 466,090
- 2006–2007: 533,708 ▲14.5%
- 2007–2008: 543,699 ▲1.87%
- 2008–2009: 593,417 ▲9.14%
- 2009–2010: 634,041 ▲6.84%
- 2010–2011: 633,055 ▼0.15%
- 2011–2012: 543,838 ▼14.09%
- 2012–2013: Not measured
- 2013–2014: 562,204 ▲3.37%
- 2014–2015: 648,397 ▲15.33%
- 2015–2016: 724,158 ▲11.68%
- 2016–2017: 681,423 ▼5.9%
- 2017–2018: 748,335 ▲9.81%
- 2018–2019: 808,750 ▲8.07%
- 2019–2020: 632,200 ▼21.83%
- 2020–2021: 262,450 ▼58.48%
- 2021–2022: 277,900 ▲5.88%

Services
Preceding station	Metro Trains	Following station
St Albans towards Cranbourne or East Pakenham via Metro Tunnel	Sunbury line	Watergardens Terminus
St Albans towards Cranbourne or East Pakenham via Metro Tunnel	Sunbury line	Watergardens towards Sunbury
Track layout
Location

Keilor Plains station is a railway station operated by Metro Trains Melbourne on the Sunbury line, part of the Melbourne rail network. It serves the northern section of the western suburb of St Albans, in Melbourne, Victoria, Australia. The station opened on 27 January 2002.

== History ==
Keilor Plains station opened on 27 January 2002 alongside Watergardens and part of the wider extension of the electrified network from St Albans to Sydenham. A station however had been planned at the site for many decades prior.

In 1967, flashing lights replaced simple passive crossing signs at the Taylors Road level crossing. At the time, these were operated manually by the signaller at St Albans. The level crossing was converted to track circuit automatic operation upon the duplication of Taylors Road in the 1970s.

In 1986, boom barriers were installed at the former Taylors Road level crossing, located at the down end of the station. Traffic lights were installed on the cantilever signals in August 1991.

In 1994, the conventional level crossing setup was replaced by a new roundabout with Sydenham Road, Taylors Road, East Esplanade and Regan Street all intersecting.

In April 2007, construction commenced on a grade separation project, Sydenham Road and the northern segment of the roundabout were both closed on 6 June 2007, with Sydenham Road closing permanently at the crossing. which involved lowering the road underneath the railway line. In October 2007, the new rail bridge was jacked into place over a single weekend with minimal disruption to train services on the Sydenham Line. The road underpass opened to vehicles in September 2008, with an opening ceremony held in November. Construction at Taylors Road was complete by 2009 with a new signalled intersection with East Esplanade.

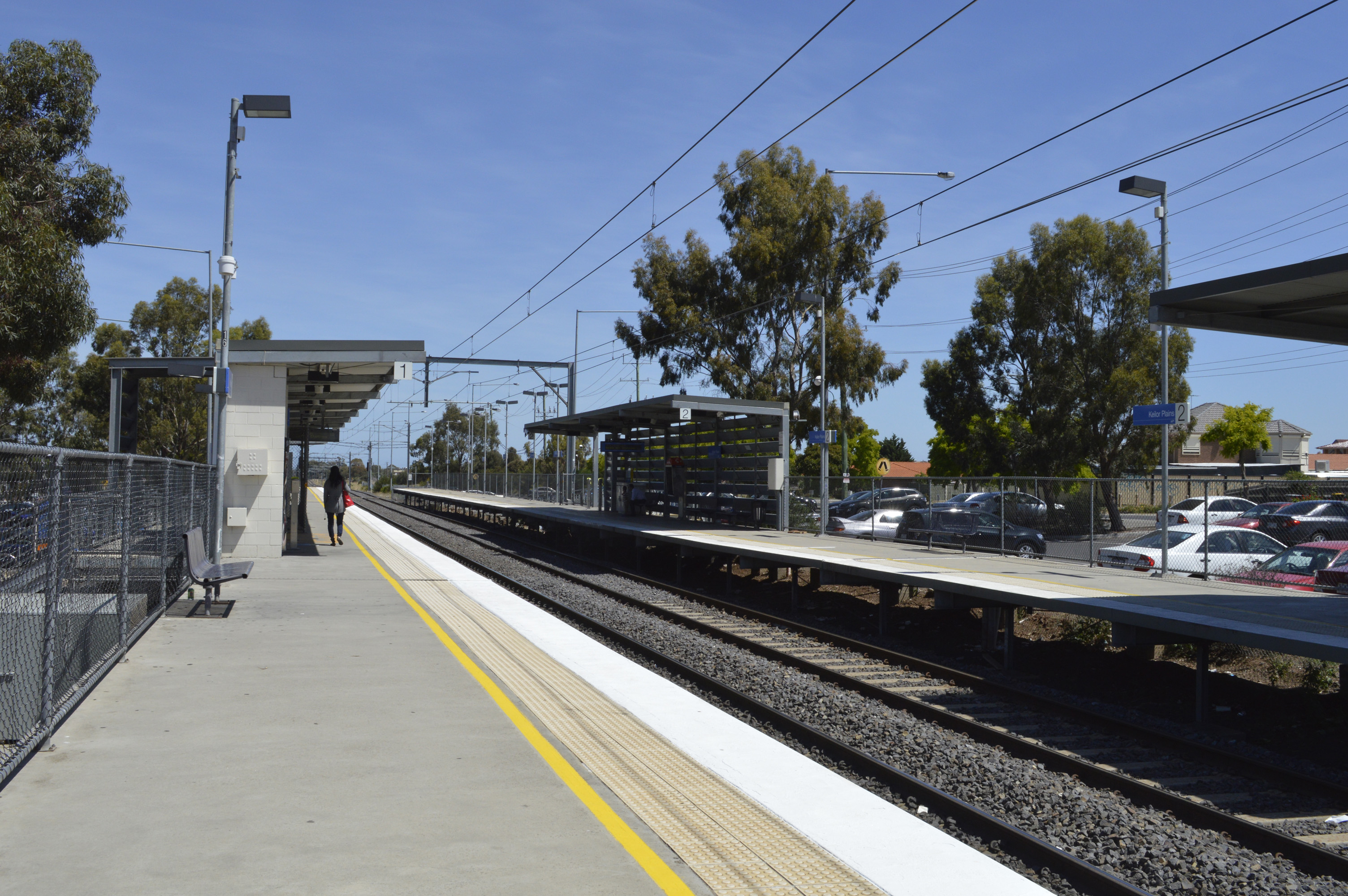
The station prior to the construction of a PSO pod

From March 2016, Protective Service Officers began patrolling the station every day, from 6pm to last service.

As part of the Sunbury Line Upgrade project starting in 2021, the station received new shelters and raised platforms at the far ends of both platforms to allow for level boardings with new High Capacity Metro Trains. On top of accessibility upgrades, extra feeder cables were installed alongside the existing overhead between South Kensington and Sunbury.

== Platforms and services ==
Keilor Plains has two side platforms and is served by Sunbury line trains.

Keilor Plains platform arrangement
Platform	Line	Destination	Via	Service Type	Notes	Source
1	Sunbury line	Westall, Dandenong, East Pakenham or Cranbourne	Town Hall	All stations and limited express services	Services to Westall and Dandenong only operate during weekday peaks.	
2	Sunbury line	Watergardens or Sunbury		All stations		

== Transport links ==
CDC Melbourne operates two routes via Keilor Plains station, under contract to Public Transport Victoria:

- 418 : St Albans station – Caroline Springs Square Shopping Centre
- 421 : St Albans station – Watergardens station
