= Watergardens railway station =

Railway station in Melbourne, Australia

Watergardens
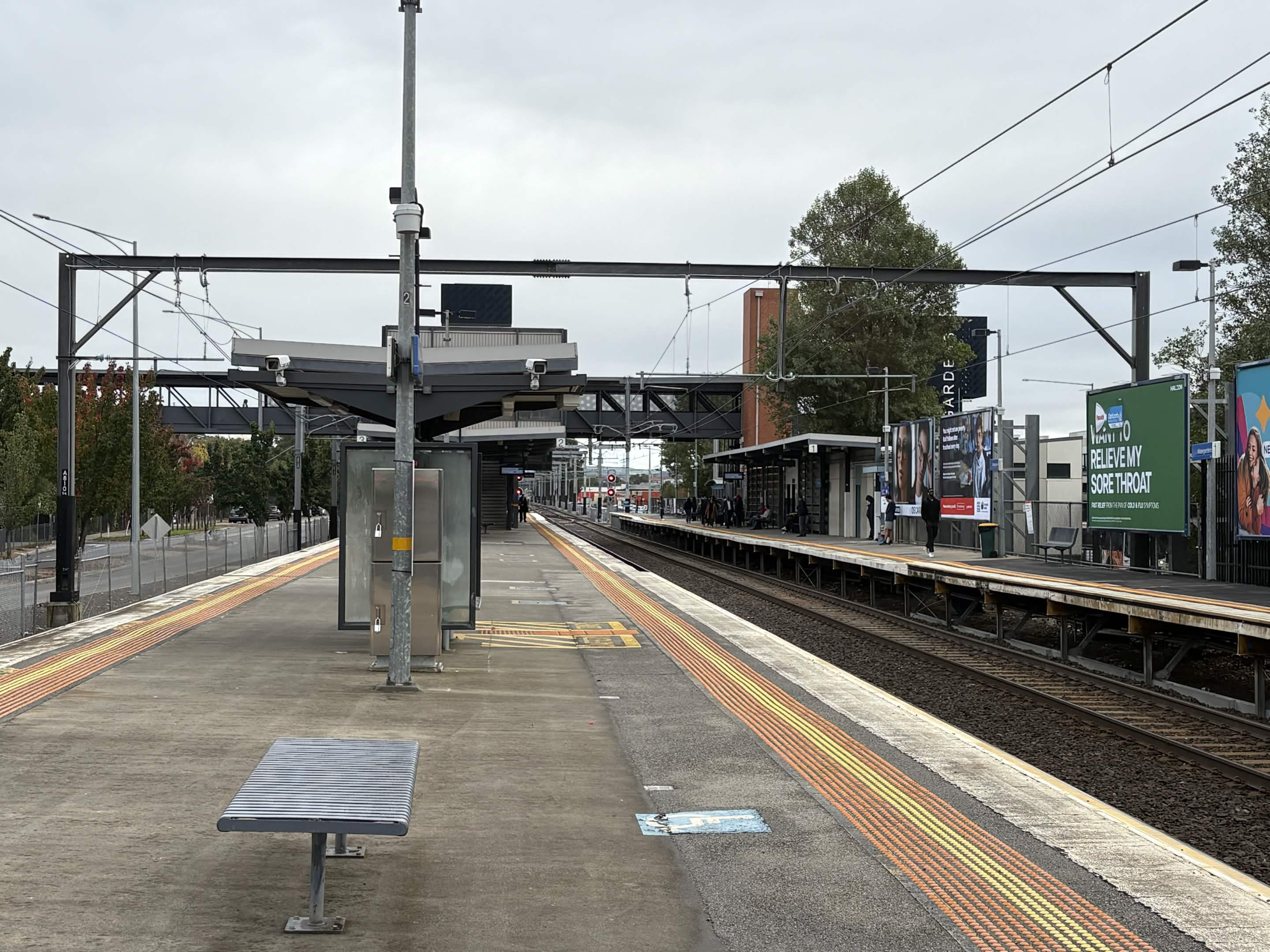
- Northbound view from the Platform 2/3 island, May 2026

General information
- Other names: Sydenham
- Location: Watergardens Circuit Road, Sydenham, Victoria 3037; City of Brimbank; Australia
- Coordinates: 37°42′03″S 144°46′26″E
- System: PTV commuter and regional rail station
- Owner: VicTrack
- Operator: Metro Trains
- Lines: Sunbury; Bendigo Swan Hill (Deniliquin)
- Distance: 23.18 kilometres from Southern Cross
- Platforms: 3 (1 side, 1 island)
- Tracks: 3
- Connections: Bus

Construction
- Structure type: Ground
- Parking: 588
- Cycle facilities: Yes
- Accessible: Yes—step free access

Other information
- Status: Operational, premium station
- Station code: SDM
- Fare zone: Myki zone 2

History
- Opened: 1 March 1859; 167 years ago
- Rebuilt: 26 January 2002; 1 November 2022
- Electrified: January 2002 (1500 V DC overhead)
- Former names: Keilor Road (1859-1887); Sydenham (1887-2002)

Passengers
- 2005–2006: 891,461
- 2006–2007: 1,000,667 ▲12.25%
- 2007–2008: 1,324,815 ▲32.39%
- 2008–2009: 1,495,998 ▲12.92%
- 2009–2010: 1,593,798 ▲6.53%
- 2010–2011: 1,618,270 ▲1.53%
- 2011–2012: 1,530,111 ▼5.44%
- 2012–2013: Not measured
- 2013–2014: 1,354,502 ▼11.47%
- 2014–2015: 1,533,562 ▲13.22%
- 2015–2016: 1,710,458 ▲11.53%
- 2016–2017: 1,523,124 ▼10.95%
- 2017–2018: 1,672,481 ▲9.8%
- 2018–2019: 1,689,500 ▲1.01%
- 2019–2020: 1,300,950 ▼22.99%
- 2020–2021: 528,500 ▼59.37%
- 2021–2022: 587,400 ▲11.14%

Services
Preceding station	Metro Trains	Following station
Keilor Plains towards Cranbourne or East Pakenham via Metro Tunnel	Sunbury line	Diggers Rest towards Sunbury
Keilor Plains towards Cranbourne or East Pakenham via Metro Tunnel	Sunbury line	Terminus
V/Line Services
Preceding station	V/Line	Following station
Footscray towards Southern Cross	Bendigo line Limited weekday peak services	Sunbury towards Bendigo
Footscray towards Southern Cross	Swan Hill line	Gisborne towards Swan Hill
Track layout
Location

Watergardens station is a railway station operated by Metro Trains Melbourne on the Sunbury line, part of the Melbourne rail network. It serves the western suburb of Sydenham, in Melbourne, Victoria, Australia. Watergardens station is a ground level premium station, featuring three platforms, an island platform with two faces and one side platform. It opened on 1 March 1859, with the current station location provided in 2002 and the platforms extension in 2022.

Initially opened as Keilor Road, this station was renamed to Sydenham on 1 April 1887, then was given its current name of Watergardens on 26 January 2002.

A stabling yard is located at the down (Sunbury) end of the station.

== History ==
=== Sydenham ===
The first railway station to open at the site was opened on 1 March 1859 on the brand new railway connecting Melbourne to Bendigo. Originally called Keilor Road, it was located directly next to the level crossing of the road with the same name (now Melton Highway).

Keilor Road station was renamed to Sydenham on 1 April 1887, matching the nearby town of which the station served.

A crossover was provided at the up (Melbourne) end of the station, allowing trains to terminate and return to Melbourne from Platform 2. Wicket interlocking gates were provided at the Keilor Road level crossing on 29 April 1926, replacing passive crossing signs. Alongside interlocking gates, a down end departure signal was also provided for trains departing towards Sunbury.

On 28 February 1987, flashing lights and boom barriers replaced the wicket interlocking gates at the Melton Highway level crossing. With this replacement, the crossing wheel as well as several levers in the station signal box were abolished.

The sidings adjacent to the station were abolished in 1989 with the crossover at the down end being removed and straight railed. At this time, the departure signal was converted from a home signal to automatic operation.

In February 1990, flashing lights replaced passive signs at the Calder Park Drive level crossing, located between Sydenham and Diggers Rest. Flashing lights were provided at the Holden Road level crossing in August 1991.

In 1995, the remaining crossover at the up end of the station was abolished and removed with the track being straight-railed shortly after. With this change, the up end departure signal was converted to automatic operation with several shunt signals also being removed at this time.

On 4 June 2001, the down line was slewed from its original alignment to the east. This was to create room for the construction of a new station slightly south of the present station as part of the St Albans-Sydenham electrification project. A temporary down platform was also built and existed during the duration of construction.

Sydenham station closed on 26 January 2002 after the last train with the temporary Platform 2 demolished. The station was replaced the next day by Watergardens with the commencement of electric suburban service from St Albans.

Sydenham station was served by V/Line's Bendigo line with services to Melbourne - Spencer Street and Bendigo. The station was also served in later years by a V/Line suburban service to Sunbury.

=== Watergardens ===
In 2002, as part of the extension of the electrified network from St Albans, Sydenham was closed, and a new station was built approximately 600 m (1,969 ft) in the up direction. Opening on 26 January of that year, the new station was named Watergardens, after the adjacent Watergardens Shopping Centre. The new station was to be called Sydenham, with the name being built into the brickwork of the station building. However, naming rights were sold to the shopping centre. The name "Sydenham" can still be seen on the side of the building adjacent to Platform 3. Around 2012, the Sydenham name was dropped, with the station now generally referred to as Watergardens.

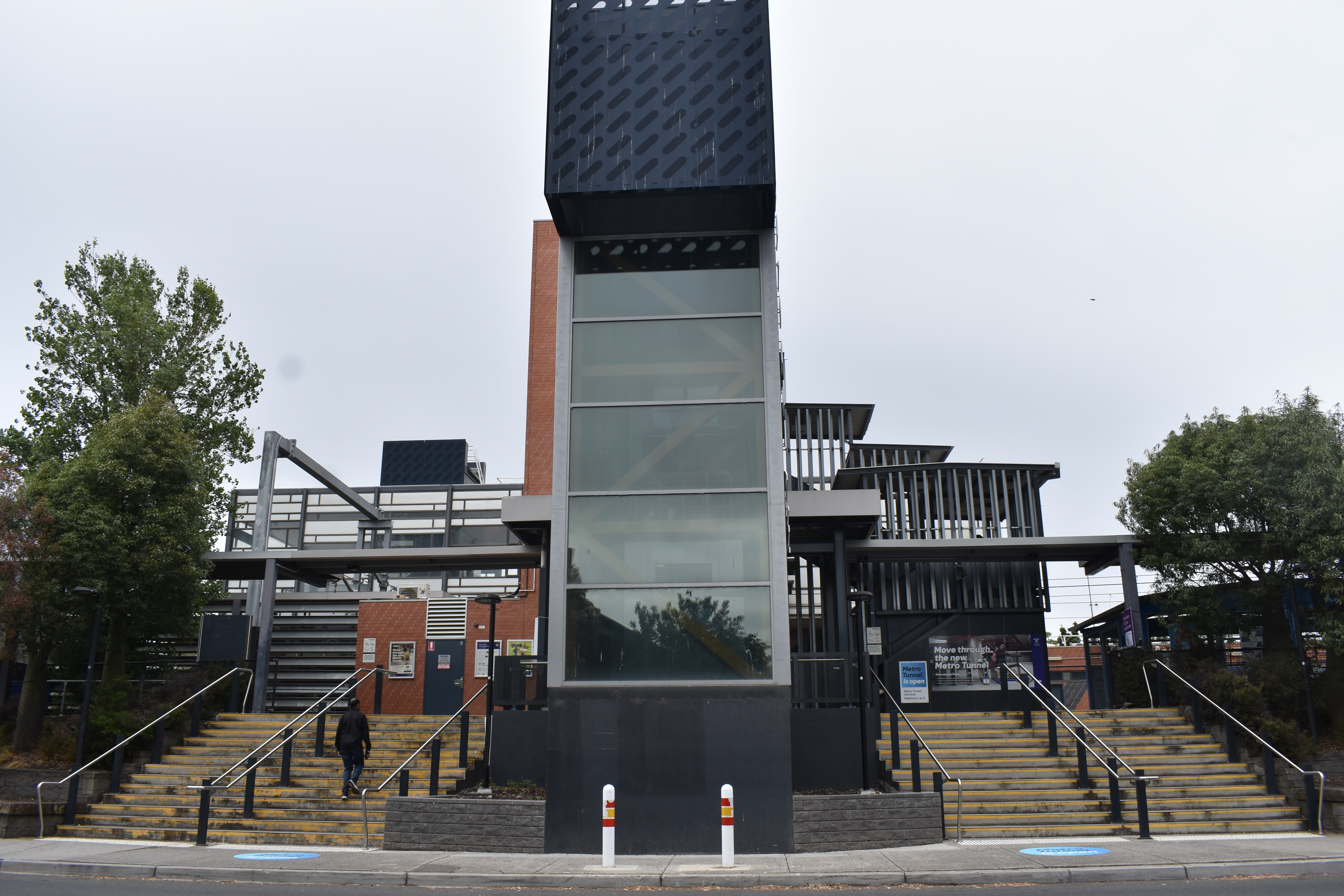
Western side station building and entrance, January 2026

In late 2002, the Melton Highway level crossing was upgraded, in conjunction with the duplication of the highway. In 2015, the Level Crossing Removal Authority announced the grade separation of the highway and railway line. In January 2018, the Melton Highway level crossing (down line) was removed and replaced with a bridge for Melton Highway, with the project completed in October.

In 2022, all three platforms were extended from 160 m (525 ft) to 163 m (535 ft) long.

In July 2025, the nearby Calder Park Drive level crossing was removed as part of the Level Crossing Removal Project.

Upon the opening of the Metro Tunnel in November 2025, Watergardens was served by limited weekend services through the tunnel, which terminated at Sunbury. From 1 February 2026, a new timetable on the Sunbury Line saw all services on the line rerouted to run through the Metro Tunnel and towards Dandenong. This new timetable saw the implementation of over 1200 new services per week on the Sunbury Line, with a portion of those new services terminating at Watergardens.

== Platforms and services ==
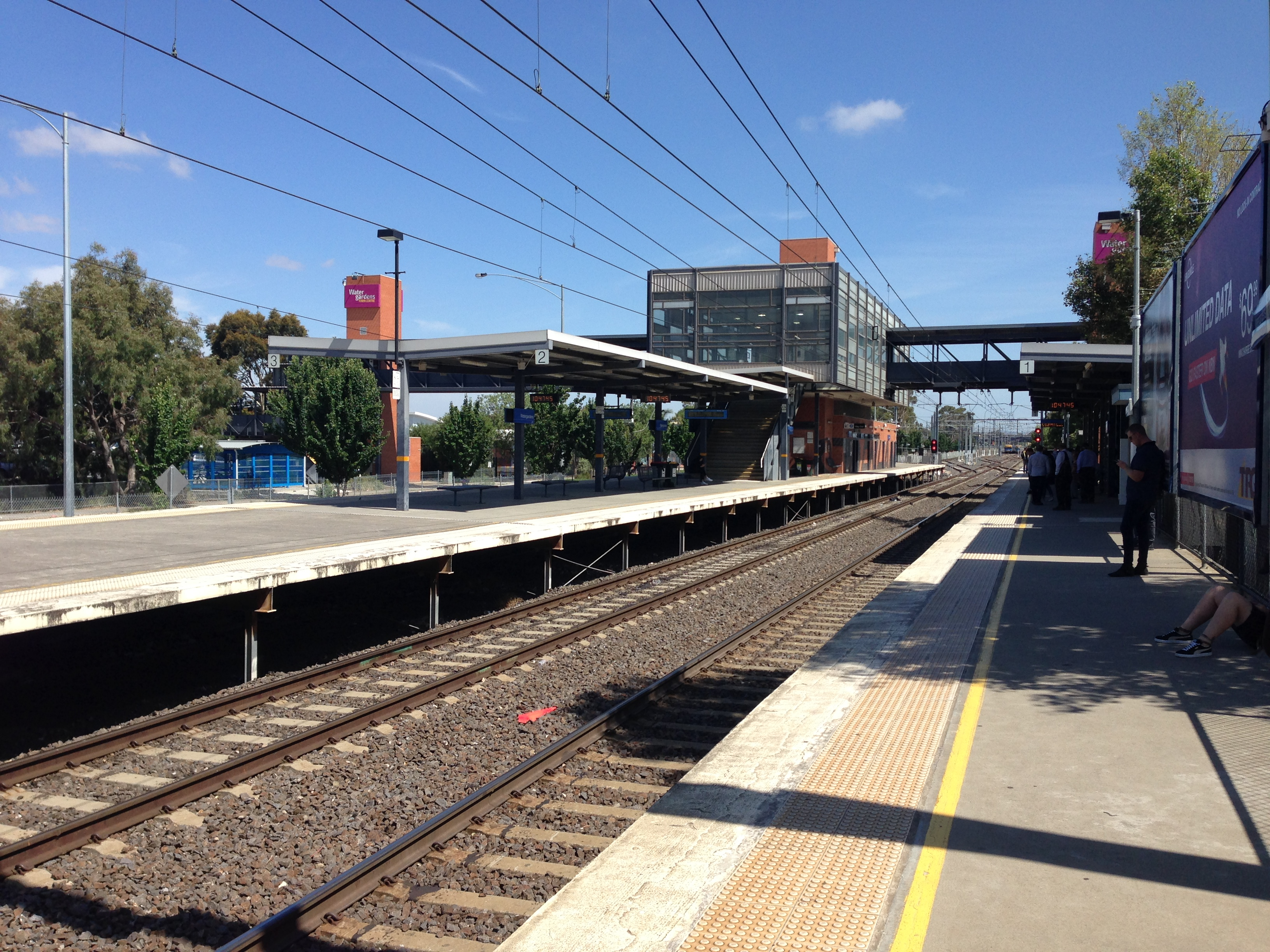
North-west bound view from Platform 1, December 2017

Watergardens has one side platform and one island platform with two faces. It is served by Sunbury line trains, as well as a limited number of V/Line services on the Bendigo and Swan Hill lines.

=== Metropolitan ===
Watergardens platform arrangement
Platform	Line	Destination	Via	Service pattern	Notes	Source
1	Sunbury line	Westall, Dandenong, East Pakenham, Cranbourne	Town Hall	All stations and limited express services	Services to Westall and Dandenong only operate during weekday peaks.	
2	Sunbury line	Westall, Dandenong, East Pakenham, Cranbourne	Town Hall	All stations and limited express services	Services to Westall and Dandenong only operate during weekday peaks.	
3	Sunbury line	Sunbury		All stations and limited express services		

=== Regional ===
Watergardens platform arrangement
Platform	Line	Destination	Via	Service Type	Notes
1	Bendigo line Swan Hill line	Southern Cross	Set down only		
3	Bendigo line Swan Hill line	Bendigo; Swan Hill	Pick up only		

== Transport links ==
CDC Melbourne operates eight routes to and from Watergardens station, under contract to Public Transport Victoria:

- 419 : to St Albans station
- 421 : to St Albans station
- 425 : to St Albans station
- 460 : to Caroline Springs station
- 462 : to Caroline Springs station
- 463 : to Caroline Springs
- 464 : to Rockbank station
- 476 : to Moonee Ponds Junction

Transit Systems Victoria operates three routes to and from Watergardens station, under contract to Public Transport Victoria:

- 420 : to Sunshine station
- Night Bus 941 : to Sunshine station (Saturday and Sunday mornings only)
- Night Bus 943 : to Melton (Saturday and Sunday mornings only)
