= Abbi Moloney =

Australian rules footballer (born 2002)

Personal information
- Full name: Abbi Moloney
- Born: 30 August 2002 (age 24)
- Original team: Sandringham Dragons (NAB League)
- Draft: No. 31, 2020 national draft
- Debut: Round 6, 2021, Collingwood vs. Western Bulldogs, at Victoria Park
- Height: 171 cm (5 ft 7 in)
- Position: Forward

Playing career^{1}
Years	Club	Games (Goals)
2021–2022 (S7)	Collingwood	9 (5)
- ^{1} Playing statistics correct to the end of the 2022 (S7) season.

Abbi Moloney (born 30 August 2002) is a professional Australian rules footballer who played for the Collingwood Football Club in the AFL Women's (AFLW). She played for Sandringham Dragons in the NAB League before she was drafted by Collingwood. She is the daughter of Troy Moloney and the granddaughter of Brian Moloney.

== Early life and state football ==
Moloney started playing football with East Malvern Knights at the age of 10, where she was coached by her father, Troy Moloney. She later played for Mentone Grammar School and joined Sandringham Dragons in 2019.

== AFLW career ==
Moloney was drafted to Collingwood with the 31st pick of the 2020 AFL Women's draft, which was Collingwood's fourth and final pick. She played in her first official hit-out in the first practice match of the season, playing against North Melbourne at Ikon Park. She made her debut in the sixth round of the 2021 AFL Women's season at Victoria Park against Western Bulldogs, the club her father and grandfather played for.

In March 2023, Moloney was delisted by Collingwood after playing nine games.

== Personal life ==
Moloney's father, Troy Moloney, played 36 games for Footscray and her grandfather, Brian Moloney played 17 games for them.

== Statistics ==
Statistics are correct to the end of the 2022 (S7) season.

Legend
G	Goals	K	Kicks	D	Disposals	T	Tackles
B	Behinds	H	Handballs	M	Marks

Season	Team	No.	Games	Totals							Averages (per game)						
Season	Team	No.	Games	G	B	K	H	D	M	T	G	B	K	H	D	M	T
2021	Collingwood	40	2	2	0	3	0	3	2	3	1.0	0.0	1.5	0.0	1.5	1.0	1.5
2022 (S6)	Collingwood	40	4	2	2	16	6	22	6	7	0.5	0.5	4.0	1.5	5.5	1.5	1.8
2022 (S7)	Collingwood	40	3	1	0	7	3	10	3	4	0.3	0.0	2.3	1.0	3.3	1.0	1.3
Career			9	5	2	26	9	35	11	14	0.6	0.2	2.9	1.0	3.9	1.2	1.6
