= Melbourne Airport Rail =

Proposed railway line in Melbourne, Victoria

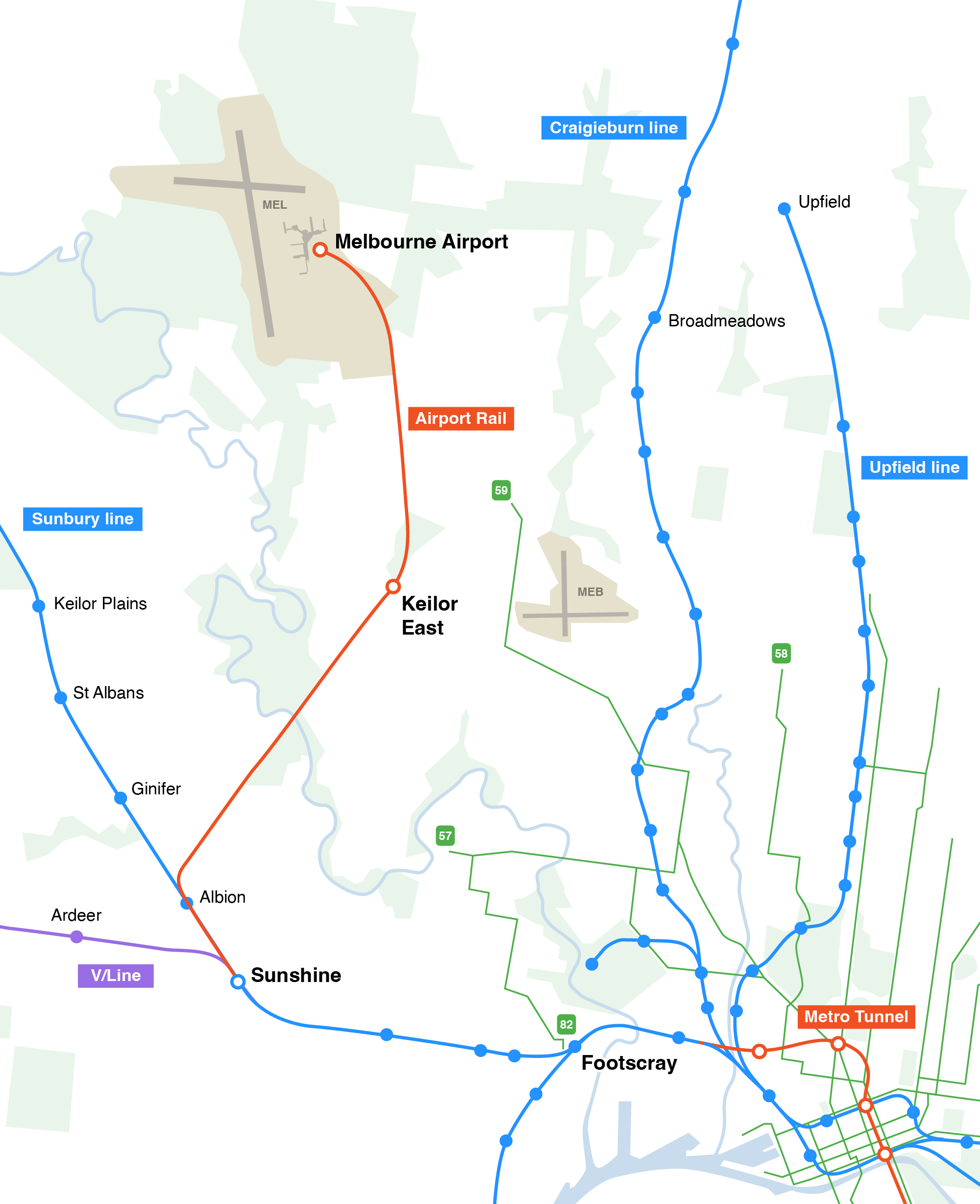
- Map of Melbourne Airport Rail

Overview
- Status: Under construction
- Owner: VicTrack (projected)
- Locale: Melbourne, Victoria
- Termini: East Pakenham, Cranbourne; Melbourne Airport
- Stations: 2 new, 2 rebuilt, 1 expanded and upgraded

Service
- Type: Airport rail link Commuter rail
- System: Melbourne railway system
- Operator: Metro Trains Melbourne (projected)
- Rolling stock: HCMT

History
- Planned opening: 2033

Technical
- Line length: 27 km (17 mi)
- Track gauge: 1,600 mm (5 ft 3 in) broad gauge

Melbourne Airport Rail is an under-construction heavy rail airport mass transit link project connecting the Melbourne central business district to Melbourne Airport in Tullamarine. The rail link will run through the existing Sunbury line and Metro Tunnel, running 27 km (16.8 mi) from the airport to Town Hall station in the Melbourne city centre with 12 km (7.5 mi) of new track between the airport and Sunshine station. The project is being delivered by the Victorian Infrastructure Delivery Authority through the Level Crossing Removal Project.

A rail link to Melbourne Airport has been proposed since the airport opened in 1970. In 2018, the Victorian state government under then Premier Daniel Andrews announced its intention to proceed with a link running via Sunshine station, in partnership with the Australian federal government. A preliminary business case was completed later that year, and in early 2019, the federal government partially agreed to fund the project. In 2020 it was announced that the link would run through the city via the Metro Tunnel.

Early construction initially began in 2022, but the project was paused and construction delayed until 2025. In April 2023, then Deputy Premier of Victoria Jacinta Allan said that due to a lack of agreement in negotiations with the airport operator, Australia Pacific Airports Corporation (APAC), over the design of the Airport station, the opening of the rail link would be delayed. In May 2023 construction contracts were paused while a federal review took place. An independent mediator was appointed in April 2024 by the federal government to resolve the ongoing dispute between the state government and the airport. In July 2024, Melbourne Airport agreed to an elevated airport station rather than an underground one.

In 2025 the federal and state governments recommitted to the project and it resumed. Works are expected to begin in 2026 on a first stage to rebuild tracks around Sunshine station, with this stage planned to be complete by 2030.

== Background ==
Melbourne Airport is located 23 kilometres (14.3 mi) north-west of the Melbourne City Centre adjacent to the industrial suburb of Tullamarine. In the 2016–17 financial year, 34.8 million passengers and 237,000 aircraft movements were recorded, making it the second-busiest airport in Australia by passenger numbers.

The airport is served by the Tullamarine Freeway, which connects to the Melbourne city centre via the CityLink tollway. An express bus service, SkyBus, connects the airport to Southern Cross railway station, a main railway terminus, with a 20–40 minute travel time and various private bus services also serve the airport precinct. SmartBus route 901 connects to Broadmeadows railway station with a one-hour journey time to the CBD at regular public transport fares.

== History ==
=== 20th century ===
With the appointment of a panel to examine the aviation needs of the growing city of Melbourne in 1958, and its recommendation of a site at Tullamarine on the city's north-western outskirts in 1959, the earliest suggestions for a railway line were made by stakeholders in the new facility's success. The City Development Association proposed connecting any new airport to the public transport as early as 1958, and Trans Australia Airlines proposed tunnelling directly between the CBD and the airport when the site was announced. Reg Ansett, however, another direct beneficiary of the new airport, envisioned helicopters and freeways becoming the primary modes of transport for passengers and staff.

The first legislative attempt at a rail link to the new airport was made in 1965, while it was still under construction. Under the Liberal state government led by Henry Bolte, Minister for Transport Edward Meagher introduced the Glenroy Tullamarine Rail Construction Bill 1965 to the state parliament, proposing the construction of a link between the Broadmeadows line at Glenroy and the new "jetport". During the bill's reading in the Lower House, Meagher estimated the new line's cost at £1.5 million, and suggested that it ought to be constructed in conjunction with a third track into the city along the existing line, works which formed part of the Victorian Railways 10-year strategic plan at the time.

The bill was focused on acquiring land and protecting the reservation for a future railway line in the interests of cost savings, and Meagher acknowledged that construction could not be justified at least until the airport had opened. However, opposing parties voted against the bill on the basis that such a railway would never be economically viable, instead suggesting a branch from the Albion–Jacana freight line in order to extend public transport option to the growing north-western suburbs. Nevertheless, the plan did reach the Upper House, where it was referred to a committee for further evaluation, but the parliamentary session lapsed before any further action was taken, and subsequent rounds of railway funding did not include any related works.

In the decades following the opening of Melbourne Airport, a number of proposals for mass transit links to the CBD emerged, many of which came from private investors and utilised emergent or unconventional technologies. One such proposal, Aérotrain, was presented by a consortium which had received the backing of the French government in the early 1970s to construct a hovertrain from Paris to Pontoise. The company proposed a similar system for Melbourne, and a feasibility study was conducted, which found the technology had a significant cost advantage over traditional heavy rail. The company's efforts were stymied by the French government's withdrawal of support in 1974 and the death of its leader in 1975, and no further progress eventuated.

=== Development of Sunshine route ===
The Liberal state government led by Jeff Kennett reserved land for an extension of what was then the Broadmeadows line to the airport via Westmeadows. Then, in 2001, the Bracks government investigated the construction of a heavy rail link to the airport under the Linking Victoria programme. Two options were considered; the first branched off the Craigieburn line to the east, and the second branched off the Albion–Jacana freight line, which passes close to the airport's boundary to the south. The second option was preferred. Market research concluded most passengers preferred travelling to the airport by taxi or car, and poor patronage of similar links in Sydney and Brisbane cast doubt on the viability of the project. This led to the project being deferred until at least 2012. On 21 July 2008, the Premier Steve Bracks reaffirmed the government's commitment to a rail link and said that it would be considered within three to five years. To maximise future development options, the airport lobbied for the on-grounds section of the railway to be underground.

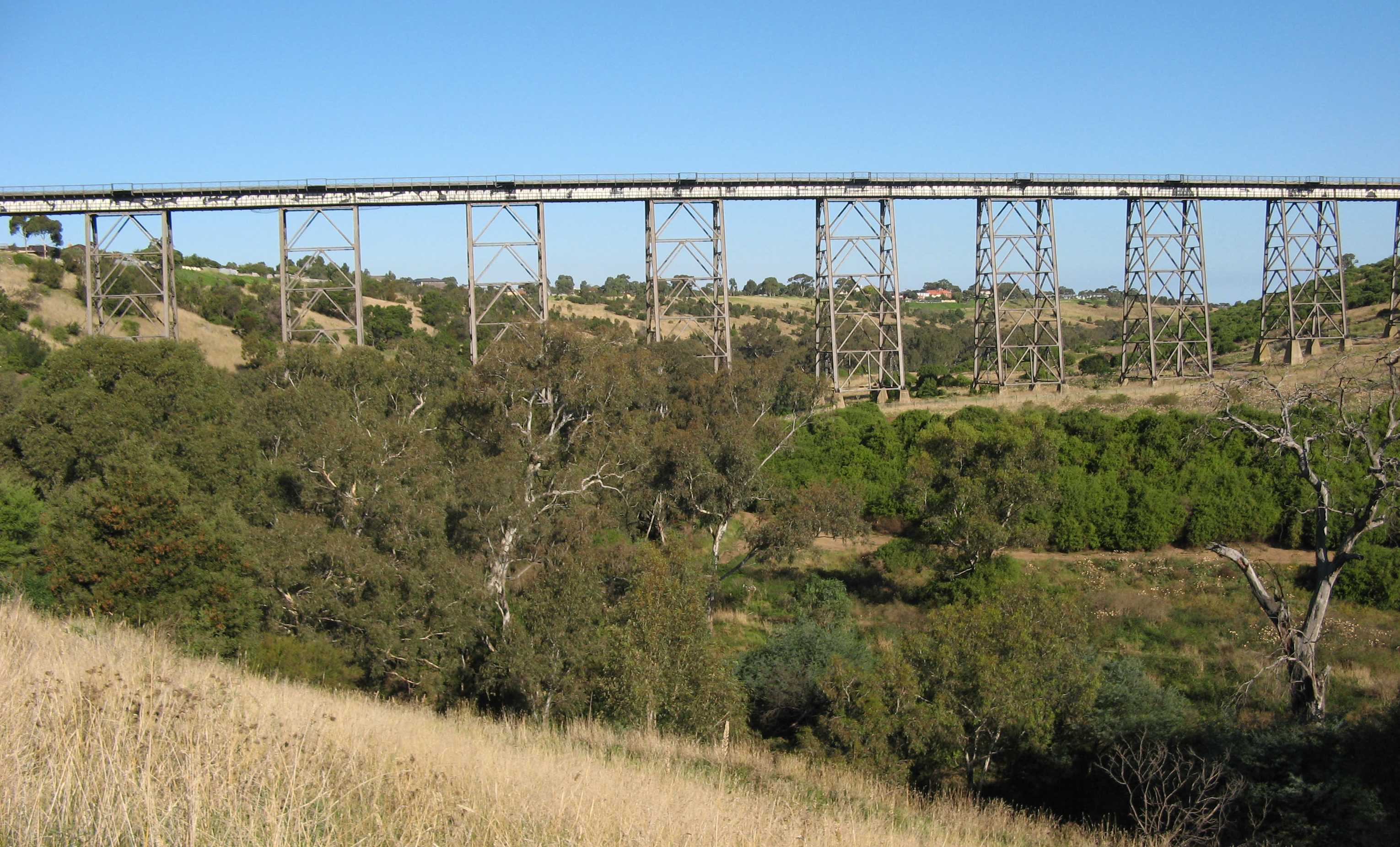
The Sunshine route would run next to the Albion Viaduct, requiring a second rail bridge next to the existing trestle rail bridge over the Maribyrnong River.

In 2010, Martin Pakula of the Labor Party, newly appointed Minister for Public Transport, announced that the rail link had been taken off the agenda with new freeway options being explored instead, however a change of government at the 2010 Victorian state election to Liberals, saw policy for the introduction of the rail link return to the agenda, with a promise by the incoming Coalition government to undertake planning for its construction. Proposals in January 2013 to improve the bus service to the airport involving turning emergency lanes into bus lanes on the freeway and the Bolte Bridge and allowing Myki to be used on SkyBus services were challenged by CityLink operator Transurban, because it would limit its toll revenue, and by Melbourne Airport, because it would reduce its car parking profits. Similar objections would apply to a rail link.

On 13 March 2013, the Victorian Liberal government under then Premier, Denis Napthine, announced that the Melbourne Airport Rail Link would be constructed around 2015/16 running from the CBD via Sunshine station and the Albion–Jacana freight line. This proposal never became a reality, with the Napthine Government losing office to the Labor Party at the 2014 state election.

A 2013 study conducted by PTV assessed over 80 options in addition to the Albion East "base case" developed by previous planning work. Ultimately, four options were shortlisted and recommended for further analysis. These four options were eventually presented in 2018 by the federal government during its announcement of funds, on the understanding that a preliminary business case to be completed in September that year would recommend one of the options.

- Sunshine/Albion East route: The Albion East route used existing passenger rail alignments from the city centre to Albion via Sunshine. It then followed the Albion–Jacana line alignment, used primarily for freight traffic, before following a new reservation north-west to the airport. This route was identified as the preferred option by the 2013 PTV study.
- Direct tunnel: This route used an entirely new alignment, constructed as a tunnel between the city centre and the above-ground reservation used by the Albion East route, from which point it continued to the airport. This route provided the fastest travel time to the airport of the four shortlisted routes. The tunnel potentially travelled via the Victoria University campus at Footscray, Highpoint Shopping Centre and the site of the former Department of Defence munitions factory at Maribyrnong. Although this option was the most expensive among the short-listed routes, and was therefore not recommended by the PTV study, it was the preferred option of the federal government because of its potential to service a new housing estate on the Defence site.
- Flemington: This route branched from the Flemington Racecourse line ran via Milleara Road, Highpoint Shopping Centre, Flemington.
- Craigieburn: This route was a branch of the Craigieburn line via Attwood, Coolaroo, Broadmeadows. This route was originally suggested in the 1960s, and was the cheapest due to being able to utilise existing land reservations to build above ground. However, it could cause longer delays on level crossings along the Craigieburn line from extra services.

=== Andrews government proposal ===
From the mid-2010s, following the construction of the Regional Rail Link, some advocates suggested an airport rail link should run via the regional rail network. A 2016 report by advocacy group the Rail Futures Institute recommended using a new diversion of the Bendigo and Seymour lines to serve the airport at the same time as segregating the regional lines from metropolitan services.

In 2015 and 2016, the Andrews government decided to shelve the Airport rail link proposal and instead focus on inner city rail projects such as the Melbourne Metro Rail Project. The airport line was excluded from the Metro Tunnel's eventual 2016 business case, with Public Transport Victoria (PTV) recognising the tunnel's entire capacity would be needed to serve the Sunbury line, as well as the Melton line when that becomes electrified; planners recommended that any airport link would require new capacity into the city. But after pressure from the Coalition Federal Governments of Tony Abbott and Malcolm Turnbull to plan for a proposal, the Andrews Government announced in May 2017 that it would spend $10 million along with the Turnbull government’s $30 million to devise a rail link planning study. On 23 November 2017, Premier Daniel Andrews told business groups that construction on a rail link between the Airport and Melbourne's Southern Cross station via Sunshine station would begin construction within the next 10 years.

On 12 April 2018, Prime Minister Malcolm Turnbull committed $5 billion for the rail link. He stated that the Victorian Government would also have to match Federal funding.

On 22 July 2018, the State Government announced that it would provide $5 billion to match Federal Government funding for the Airport rail link, allowing the project to become a reality. Under the state government's plan, a business case would be completed by the end of 2019 and construction would commence by 2022. Then, in early September, the airport link featured in the state government's Suburban Rail Loop proposal, as part of an orbital line extending from Cheltenham in the city's east to Werribee in the west.

Later in September, a private consortium including the operators of Melbourne Airport and Southern Cross station, as well as Metro Trains Melbourne, the incumbent metropolitan rail franchisee, and IFM Investors, presented an unsolicited proposal to the government, offering to contribute $5 billion in private equity alongside the existing government contributions. The consortium, AirRail Melbourne, proposed using the funds to substantially rebuild Southern Cross, and provide dedicated tracks along the entire route via Sunshine and a new tunnel.

=== Detailed planning and preferred route ===
The Victorian Government committed to the Sunshine option with the release of its Strategic Assessment of the route in July 2018. The Federal government under Malcolm Turnbull had pushed for the direct tunnel route through Maribyrnong, as it proposed to redevelop the unused Defence site along the Maribyrnong River into a new residential area and connect the airport to the nearby Highpoint Shopping Centre. In 2019, under new Prime Minister Scott Morrison, both the federal and state governments backed the Sunshine route as part of their funding commitments to the project.

Government planning explored a number of questions about the route, including how it would interact with the under-construction Metro Tunnel, the planned Suburban Rail Loop, and potential faster rail services to Geelong, Ballarat and Bendigo. Initially the Government considered additional Sunshine-to-CBD rail capacity that could be used by faster train services to Geelong and Ballarat alongside new, electrified Metro lines to Melton and Wyndham Vale as part of the Western Rail Plan. In 2019, the Government indicated it did not want to build a dedicated tunnel between the CBD and Sunshine for Airport and regional trains due to cost.

Map showing the proposed Sunshine alignment of the Airport Rail Link, along with past rail lines, current lines and proposed lines

In late 2020, the Victorian and federal governments announced that the Airport Rail Link would be built as a branch of the metropolitan lines that are to run through the Metro Tunnel, with trains not running to Southern Cross station but instead running into the CBD through the five new underground Metro Tunnel stations, then on towards Pakenham and Cranbourne. More than 30 stations will have a one-seat journey to the airport under the plan. The government also rejected a private-sector offer to build a 7 km (4.3 mi) express tunnel from Southern Cross to West Footscray. Construction was planned to start in 2022 with the full line opening in 2029. The government also announced it was considering adding an additional station along the new line between Sunshine and the airport, near Airport West and Keilor Park.

In September 2022, the State Government released the project's business case, which found the project would return an economic benefit of $2.10 for every dollar spent. Then Transport Infrastructure Minister Jacinta Allan also announced that the airport station would be elevated, rather than underground, and that a new station would be added at Keilor Park in Melbourne's north-west. The elevated design, Allan said, would be quicker to build, cheaper and cause less disruption. Melbourne Airport objected to the proposal, calling for the station to be underground in order to facilitate its plans for terminal expansion.

=== Initial early works and tendering ===
The airport link was set to be delivered across a number of construction packages. In June 2021, the first package was put out to tender for works around Sunshine and Albion stations. In November 2021 two works packages were put out for the premium station at Melbourne Airport and a 6 km (3.7 mi) long section of elevated rail over the Western Ring Road and above Airport Drive. In March 2022, a contract was awarded to Laing O'Rourke as managing contractor to deliver early works on the project, including the relocation and protection of utilities along the route, with works beginning in late 2022 and completed in 2024.

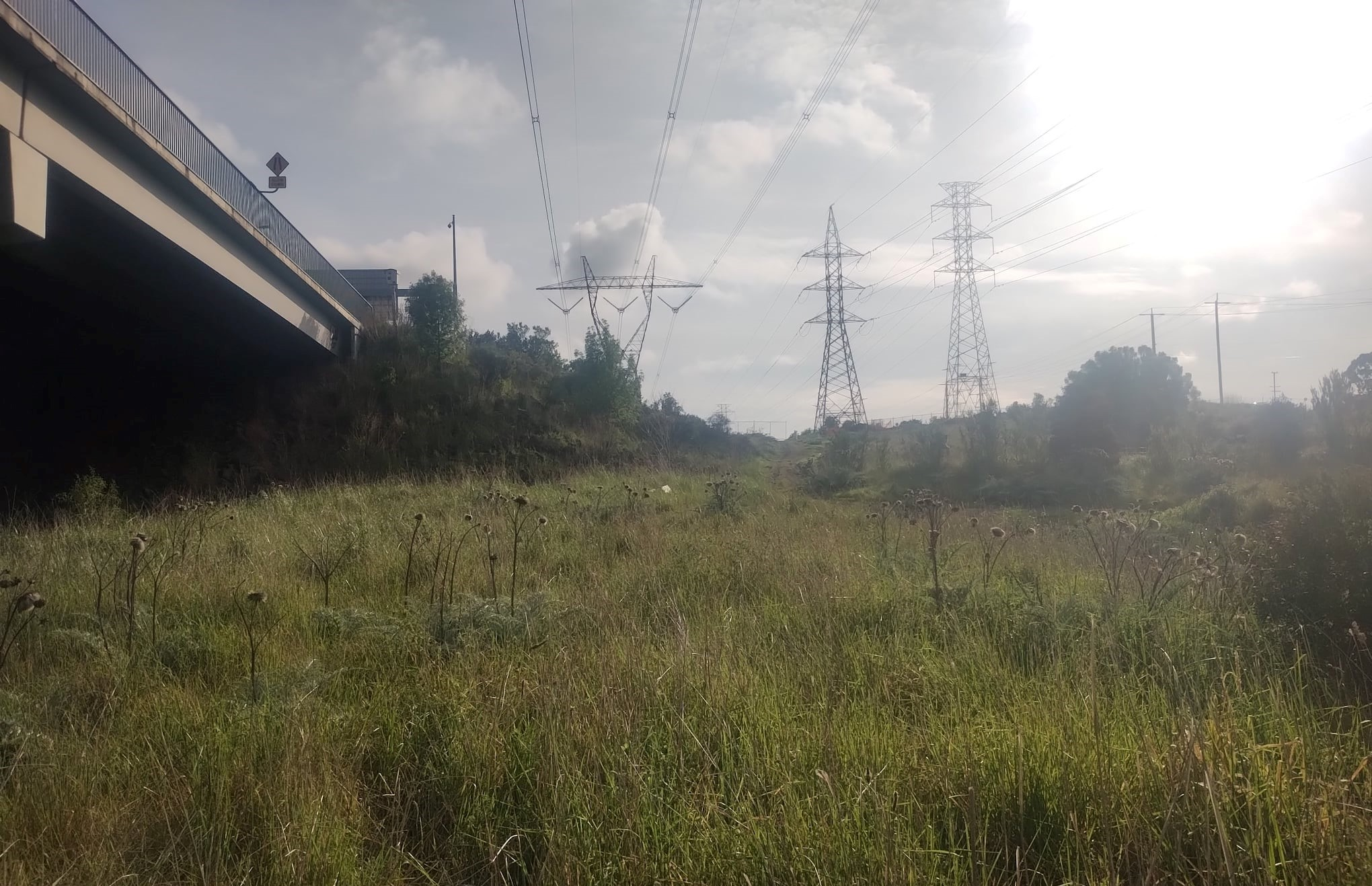
These electricity transmission towers were planned to be relocated to allow elevated rail over the M80 Ring Road (left).

In late October 2022, construction starting on the rail link with works to relocate six electricity transmission towers. Premier Daniel Andrews announced a consortium of FCC Construction Australia and Winslow Infrastructure was selected as the preferred contractor to deliver a package of major construction works including the 550-metre (1,804 ft) bridge over the Maribynong River.

A second contract of works, the Sunshine Systems Alliance package, was awarded to a consortium of John Holland, CPB, KBR and AECOM, which included corridor-wide train signalling, works to Sunshine and Albion stations and twin tracks between Sunshine station and the Albion-Jacana corridor, including the new Albion rail flyover. A package of corridor works was set to be awarded in 2023.

The Premier also announced $143 million in extra funding for developing Sunshine station and its surroundings, including a new bus interchange and new open space as part of the Sunshine station masterplan, which was released at the same time. The project was also rebranded as SRL Airport to emphasise its role in the Suburban Rail Loop corridor, although the project will run conventional Metro Trains services compared to the fully separate Suburban Rail Loop; though this branding was later dropped.

=== Project delays and Airport station dispute ===
In the lead-up to the 2023 state budget, media reports suggested there may be a delay in the project's opening date. In a radio interview, Deputy Premier Jacinta Allan said slow and difficult negotiations with Melbourne Airport operator Australia Pacific Airports Corporation (APAC) over the use of airport land for the project had caused delays. The airport argued for an underground station at the airport to allow for future expansion and improve connectivity to the proposed Suburban Rail Loop.

Melbourne media also reported that the state government had requested a four-year delay in the project from the federal government and planned to abandon the $2 billion Geelong fast rail project, due to budget pressures and the construction sector being over capacity.

On 17 May 2023, the state government confirmed that contracting for further works on the project would be paused and no new contracts would be signed until the completion of a federal review of the country's infrastructure pipeline. Early works would continue as part of the awarded early works contract, but no new contracts were to be entered into. Reports suggested some construction workers were redeployed to other Victorian infrastructure projects. The Albanese government announced a 90-day review into the previous federal government's infrastructure funding commitments, signalling some projects may be delayed or cancelled.

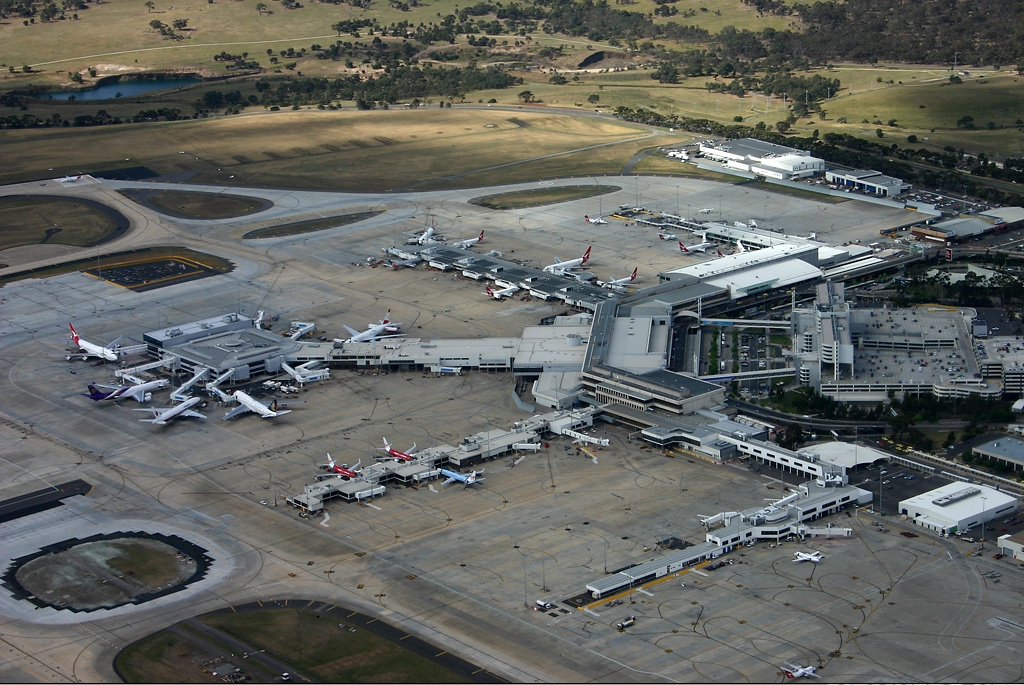
Aerial view of Melbourne Airport. The design of the terminating station at the airport was the subject of extended dispute.

On 16 November 2023, the federal government announced that the project would not be axed as part of the 90-day infrastructure review and re-committed their $5 billion commitment to the project. New Victorian Premier Jacinta Allan blamed failed negotiations with the airport over whether the airport station would be elevated or underground, saying it had caused significant delays to the project. Allan said after three years of negotiation the issue had not been resolved and that until it was a new opening date and final cost could not be known. Because airport land is regulated by federal rather than state powers, any station requires a planning application to come directly from the airport. Following the announcement, local media reported that as part of negotiations the airport was seeking up to $1 billion in compensation for issues like land devaluation from the rail link. Melbourne Airport CEO Lorie Argus said she would continue to advocate for an underground station.

In April 2024, former Queensland transport public servant Neil Scales was appointed as an independent mediator by the federal government to resolve the ongoing Airport station design dispute between the state government and the airport. In May 2024, Victorian Treasurer Tim Pallas confirmed in the state budget that the project would be delayed by at least four years, with completion not expected until 2033 at the earliest. After blaming the airport for the ongoing project impasse, Pallas suggested that Avalon Airport could receive funding for a new rail link instead if delays persist.

In July 2024, Melbourne Airport backed down from its initial demands and agreed to a compromise, ending almost 8 months of stalled negotiations. Airport CEO Lorie Argus conceded that the Victorian people "had waited long enough" and agreed to an elevated station at the airport. Additionally, the airport hoped for the project to be finished and in operation by 2030, despite officially being delayed by at least four years. In 2025 the airport and the Victorian Government signed a Memorandum of Understanding on the project. The federal Albanese Government announced a further $2 billion for the project, bringing federal funding to $7 billion and the Victorian Government agreed to bring forward $2 billion of its $5 billion funding commitment to restart works initially at Sunshine station.

== Project description ==
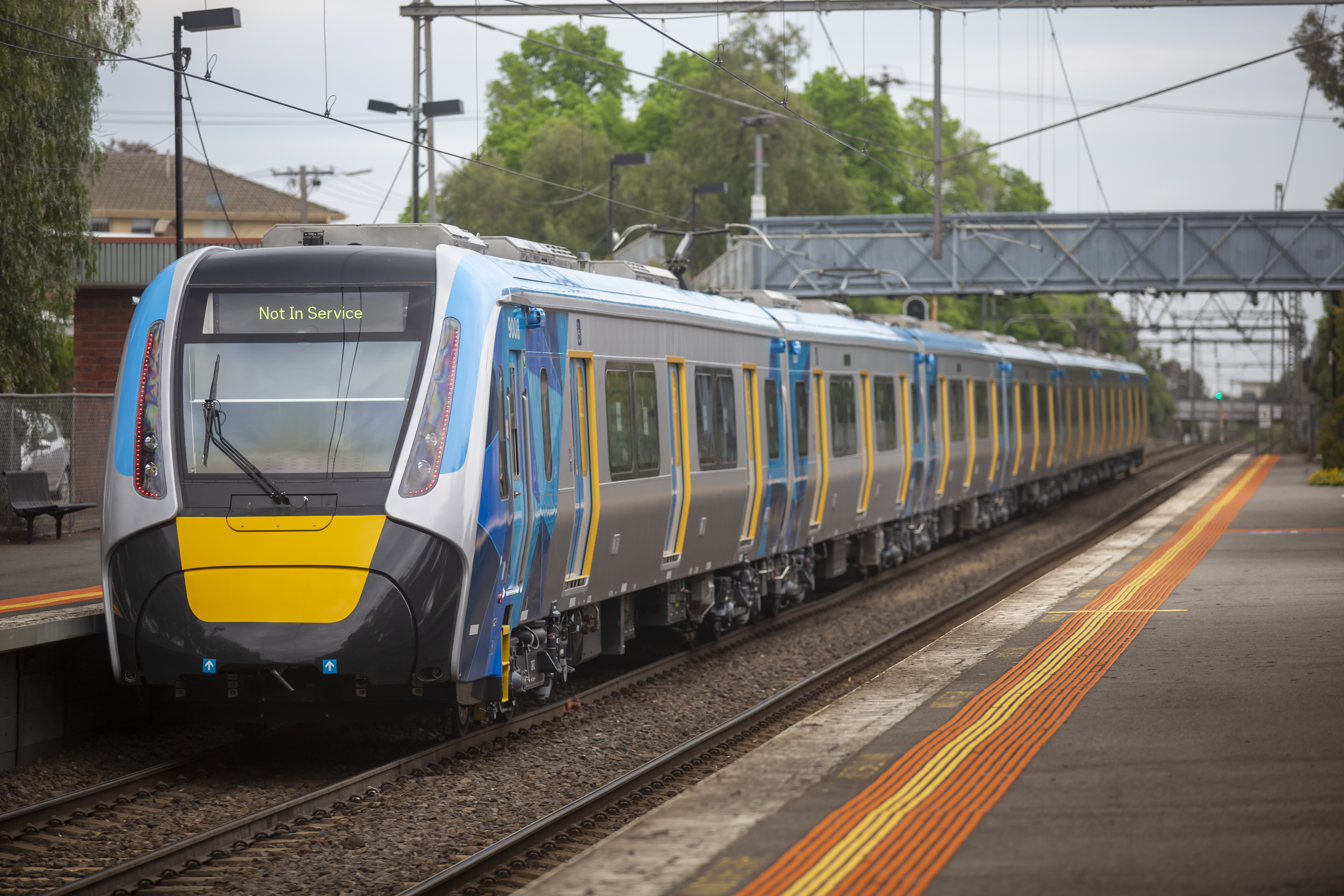
The airport line will use High Capacity Metro Trains, introduced as part of the Metro Tunnel project.

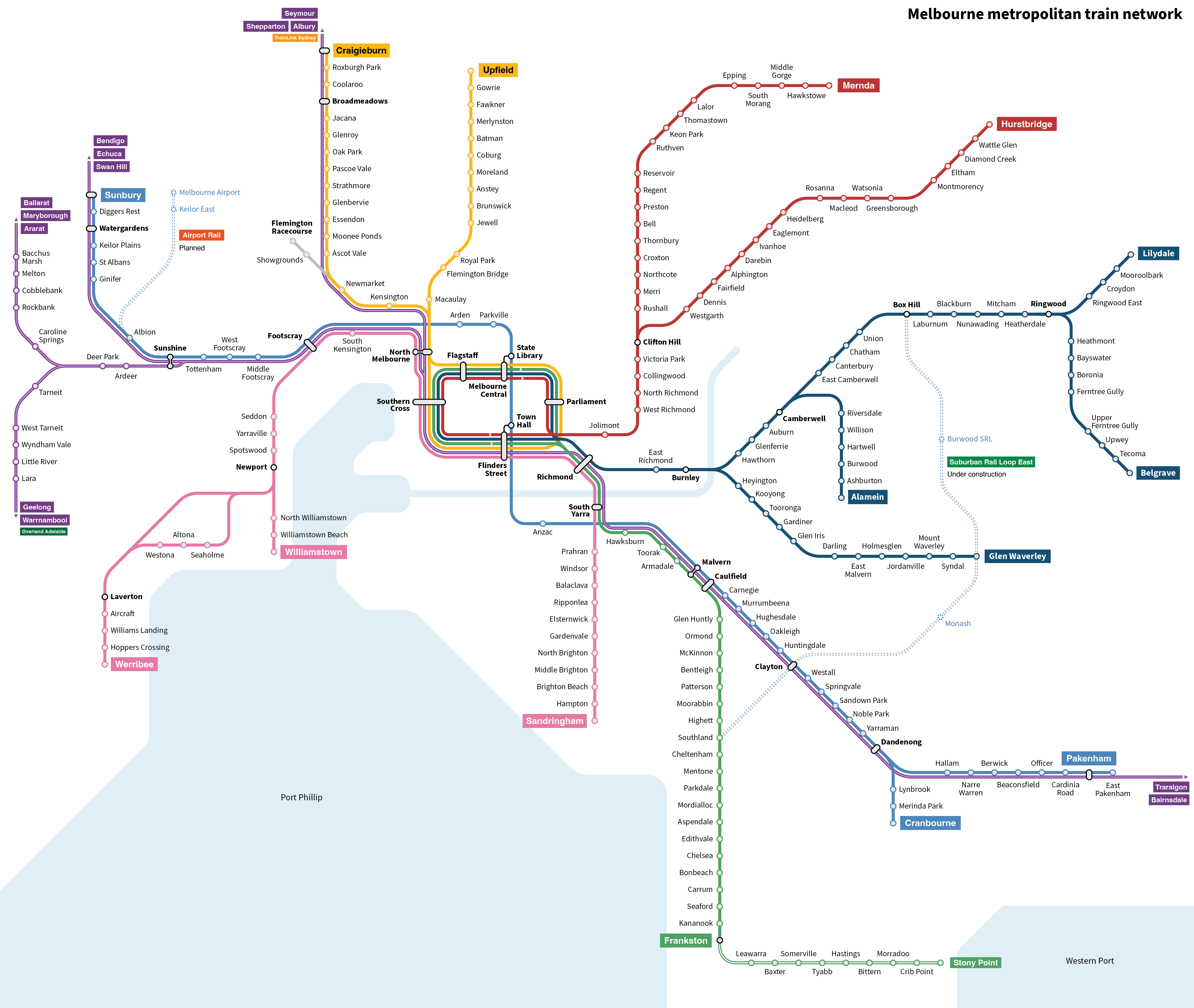
Map of the Melbourne metropolitan rail network with the Airport link shown as a dashed line

The airport link will be a branch of Melbourne's existing metropolitan rail network, running express, except for a stop at one new station, from Sunshine to the airport. 12 km (7.5 mi) of new double track will be built from Sunshine station to a new premium station at Melbourne Airport. A new rail bridge will be built above the Maribyrnong River next to the existing heritage Albion Viaduct. The new bridge will be 55 metres (180 ft) high and 383 metres (1,257 ft) long and become the second-highest bridge in Victoria after the West Gate Bridge.

At the city end, the Airport line will run through the new underground Metro Tunnel, which fully opened in February 2026 (public services first began on November 30th 2025). The new Metro Tunnel stations at State Library and Town Hall will allow interchange to all other suburban services via their respective nearby major stations of Melbourne Central and Flinders Street. High Capacity Metro Trains, 7-car trains introduced as part of the Metro Tunnel project, will run to the airport. Plans from 2022 said that airport trains will run every ten minutes all-day, taking approximately 30 minutes to reach the CBD from the airport.

=== Stage 1 ===
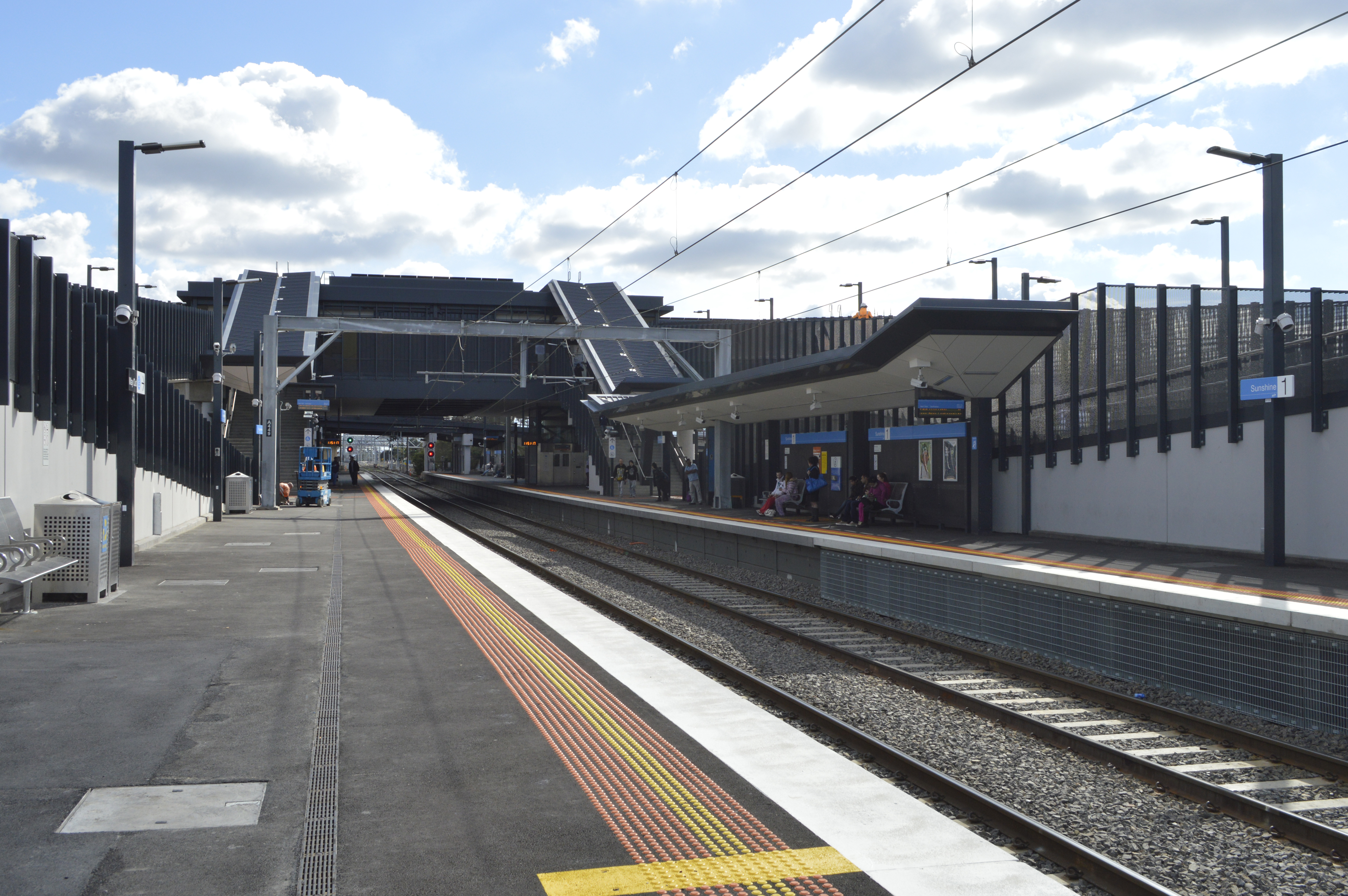
Sunshine railway station in Melbourne's west is planned to be upgraded as part of the airport rail link

Stage 1 of the project, officially called “Melbourne Airport Rail Stage 1: West Footscray to Albion Rail Upgrade”, is scheduled to for completion in 2030.

Works as part of Stage 1 include:

- An expansion of Sunshine station, turning it into the so-called Sunshine Superhub. Sunshine will become a new Western rail hub, not only for suburban and regional passengers changing to the airport line, but for an increased number of interchanges between suburban and regional services as well. Passenger interchanges will be possible between the Bendigo, Ballarat and Geelong V/Line lines, thus eliminating the need for passengers travelling between those regional cities to travel closer into the CBD to change trains. The Sunshine Superhub will include a new concourse, new platforms, platform extensions and accessibility upgrades, as well as changes to enable the planned electrification of the railway to Melton.
- A new Tottenham station: Tottenham station will be completely rebuilt.
- A new Albion station: Albion station will be demolished and a new station built. Works will commence on this redevelopment in 2028.

=== Stage 2 ===
Stage 2 of the project will complete the railway from Albion station to the Airport. Stage 2, and therefore the entire Melbourne Airport Rail link project, is scheduled for completion in 2033.

- Two new stations will be built as part of Stage 2:
  - Melbourne Airport station: The first new station will be the terminus station at Melbourne Airport. Melbourne airport station is currently planned to be an elevated terminal station, connected by a walkway to the airport's main terminals. The design will accommodate a future Suburban Rail Loop connection.
  - Keilor East station: The second new station will be one ostensibly at Keilor East, though the station will actually built at the border of the suburbs of Airport West and Keilor Park. This station will allow commuters in that part of Melbourne's north-west local access to Melbourne’s rail network for the first time.
- In Albion, an 18-metre (59 ft) high railway flyover will be built running over Albion station and Ballarat Road.
- A 6 km (3.7 mi) long section of elevated rail over the Western Ring Road and Airport Drive will be built.

On 30 September 2026, Stage 2 of the project was announced to be divided into 2 sections:

- the Albion to Keilor East section of the line is to commence early works in 2026, but full construction works "on this second stage... will not begin until 2028." Rail services to Keilor East are expected to begin operation in 2031.
- the Keilor East to Melbourne Airport section of the line will occur after the Albion to Keilor East section has begun, although the finalised timeline has yet to be confirmed. Public speculation continues as to whether the 2033 opening is still possible under this project revision.

== Construction ==
=== Project resumption ===
The project was paused in 2023 following a dispute between the Victorian Government and Melbourne Airport and state budget pressures. The two parties signed a Memorandum of Understanding in 2025, allowing the project to restart. That year the federal Albanese Government announced a further $2 billion for the project, bringing federal funding to $7 billion. The Victorian Government agreed to bring forward $2 billion of its $5 billion funding commitment to restart works initially at Sunshine station.

=== Stage 1 ===
As of June 2026, Stage 1 of construction between West Footscray and Albion stations is underway.

Track realignment for Stage 1 was planned to recommence in 2026 around Sunshine station. Works will be spread across a 6km rail corridor and include an extended concourse, two new dedicated regional platforms, three new rail bridges, realigned passenger and freight lines and upgraded signalling. The works will separate different rail services and create flying junctions to allow the airport line and a potential future electrification of the regional line to Melton to use the Metro Tunnel. This package of works will be divided into five construction packages. Responsibility for the project was given to the Level Crossing Removal Project, a division of the Victorian Infrastructure Delivery Authority.

From April 2026, major pipeline works were being carried out at Albion station. In May 2026, Airport Rail preliminary works began at Tottenham station.

== See also ==
- Avalon Airport railway line
- Proposed Melbourne rail extensions

== Bibliography ==
- Aroozoo, Marianne (October 2017). Research paper: Melbourne Airport rail link. Parliamentary Library & Information Service. Archived from the original on 17 April 2018.
