= Quarter mile =

Quarter-mile or 1/4 mile may refer to:

- A dragstrip competition or vehicle test in motorsport, where cars or motorcycles compete for the shortest time from a standing start to the end of a straight 1/4 mile (0.40 km) track
- The 440-yard dash, a sprint footrace in track and field competition on a 440 yards (1,320 ft; 400 m; 0.25 mi) oval
- The 400 metres, a sprint on a 437.445319 Yards oval
- Quarter Mile Bridge, the local name for the Maribyrnong River Viaduct in Australia
- Quarter Mile Walkway, a .41 mile long pedestrian walkway through Rochester Institute of Technology's main campus
- Quarter mile horse races on open roads in the US Colonial Era which gave the American Quarter Horse its name
