= Keilor East =

- Suburb
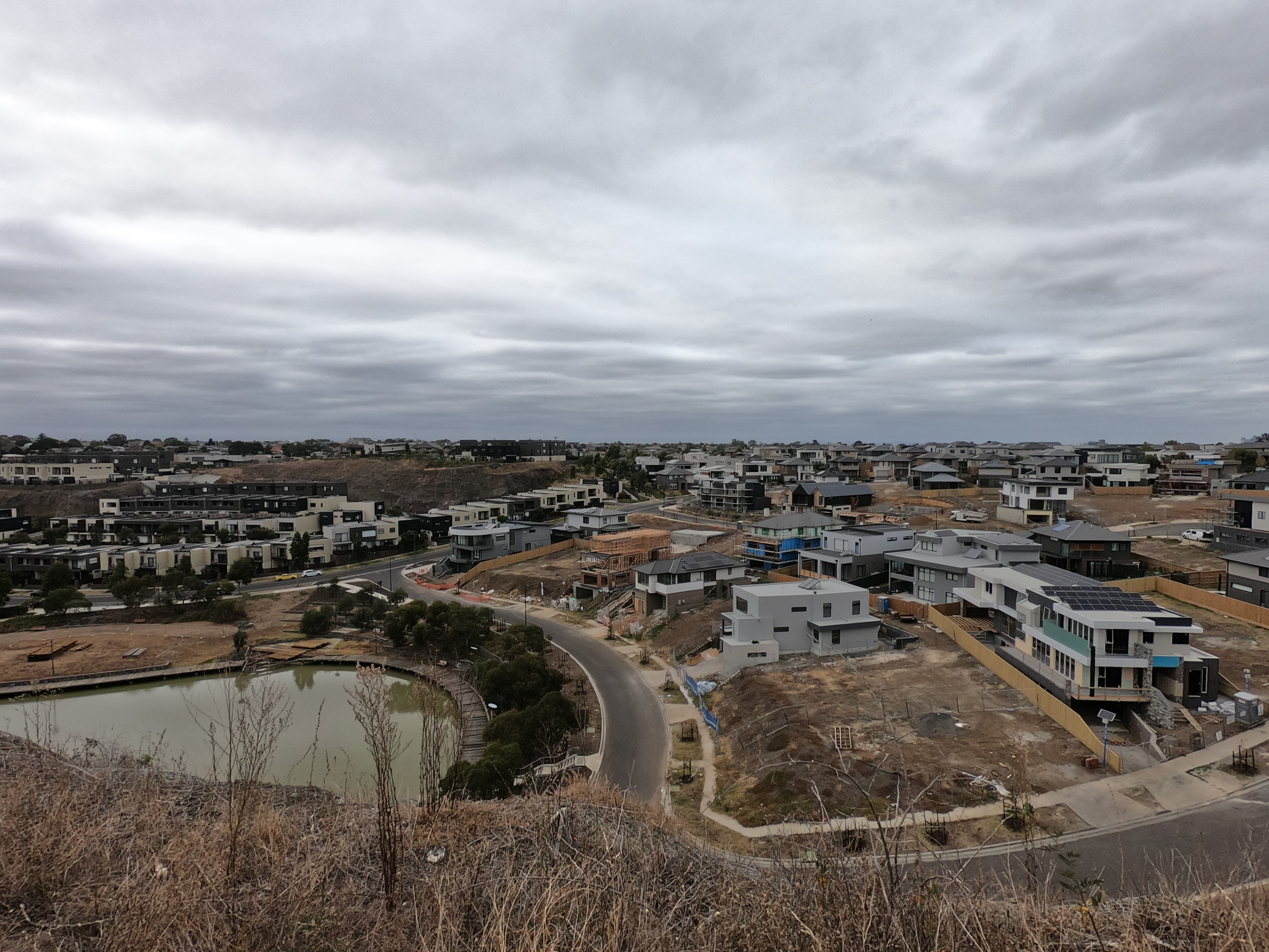
- Valley Lake is a housing development in Keilor East on the site of a former quarry

- Interactive map of Keilor East
- Coordinates: 37°44′30″S 144°51′47″E
- Country: Australia
- State: Victoria
- City: Melbourne
- LGAs: City of Brimbank; City of Moonee Valley
- Location: 13 km (8.1 mi) NW of Melbourne

Government
  - State electorate: Niddrie
  - Federal division: Maribyrnong

Area
  - Total: 9.5 km^{2} (3.7 sq mi)
- Elevation: 66 m (217 ft)

Population
  - Total: 15,073 (2021 census)
  - Density: 1,587/km^{2} (4,109/sq mi)
- Postcode: 3033
Suburbs around Keilor East
Keilor	Keilor Park	Airport West
Kealba	Keilor East	Niddrie
Sunshine North	Avondale Heights	Essendon West

Keilor East or East Keilor is a suburb in Melbourne, Victoria, Australia, 13 km (8.1 mi) north-west of Melbourne's Central Business District, located within the Cities of Brimbank and Moonee Valley local government areas. Keilor East recorded a population of 15,073 at the 2021 census.

Keilor East is bounded in the west by the Maribyrnong River in the City of Brimbank, in the north by the Calder Freeway, in the east by Hoffmans Road, and in the south by Buckley Street, Steele Creek and Rosehill Road.

== History ==
Keilor East Post Office opened on 1 July 1947. This was renamed Niddrie in 1956, and a new Keilor East office opened in November 1957. Lincolnville Post Office on McFarlane Street opened in 1964 and closed in 1988.

Keilor East was previously located in the former City of Keilor, though now sits partially in the City of Brimbank (west of the Albion-Jacana railway line) and the remainder in the City of Moonee Valley (east of the Albion-Jacana railway line).

=== Heritage listings ===
The following places in Keilor East are listed on the Victorian Heritage Register:

- Albion Viaduct, also known as the Maribyrnong River Viaduct, across the Maribyrnong River that carries the Albion-Jacana railway line and connects with Sunshine North
- Keilor Iron Bridge over the Maribyrnong River

== Commerce ==
Keilor East contains the Milleara Shopping Centre (previously named and still commonly known as Milleara Mall), on the corner of Milleara Road and Buckley Street, as well as the small Centreway Shopping Centre and Dinah Parade shopping strip.

== Transport ==
East Keilor is served by five bus routes:

- 406: to Footscray, operated by CDC Melbourne
- 407: Highpoint Shopping Centre – Avondale Heights, operated by CDC Melbourne
- 465: Essendon station – Keilor Park, operated by CDC Melbourne
- 469: to Moonee Ponds Junction, operated by CDC Melbourne
- SmartBus 903: Altona station – Mordialloc, operated by Kinetic Melbourne

Keilor East railway station is a proposed station on the proposed Melbourne Airport line. This line will run to Melbourne Airport, and will open in 2029. There will be approximately a 27-minute travel time to the Melbourne CBD, via Sunshine and the Metro Tunnel.

Large parts of the suburb are under the flight path of the nearby Melbourne Airport which is curfew-free.

== Education ==
Keilor East is served by a public primary school, Keilor Heights Primary School, and an independent primary school, St. Peters School; and the senior campus of the independent secondary school, Penleigh and Essendon Grammar School.

Keilor East had many more schools in the 1980s and 1990s, such as Lincolnville Primary School, Keilor South Primary School, and Overland Primary School. Lincolnville and Keilor South merged in 1988 to form Rosehill Park Primary School (on the former Keilor South Primary School site). At the end of 1993, Rosehill Park and Overland were closed with Keilor Heights absorbing most of their students. Between 1993 and 2025, a campus of the Essendon Keilor College, a public secondary school, was located in the suburb.

== Notable people from Keilor East ==
- Tina Arena – singer
- Shane Jacobson – of the movie Kenny and television shows Kenny's World and co-host of Top Gear Australia
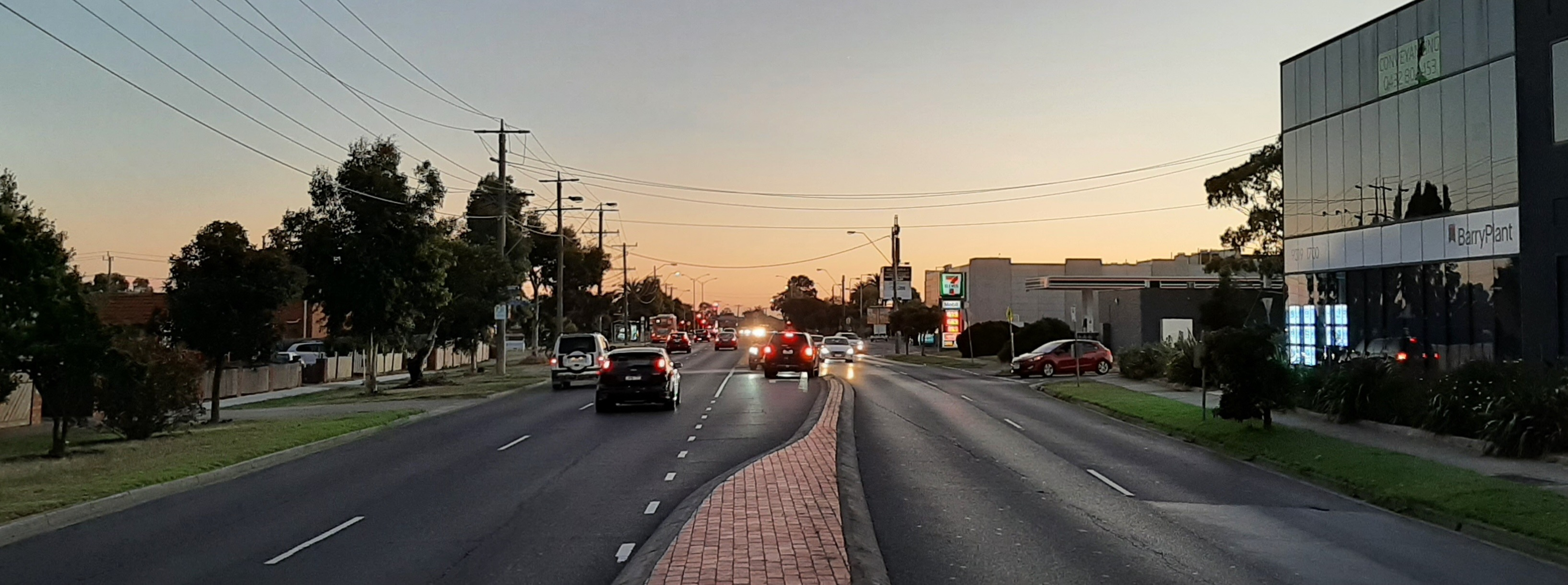
- Milleara Road is a major thoroughfare in the suburb
  John Barbuto – founder of JB Hi-Fi
- Damien Peverill – footballer
- Curtis Stone- chef

== Sporting facilities ==
- East Keilor Football Club, an Australian Rules football team, competes in the Essendon District Football League.
- East Keilor Cricket Club
- East Keilor Leisure Centre
- East Keilor Tennis Club.

== See also ==
- City of Keilor – Keilor East was previously within this former local government area.
