= Keilor East railway station =

Planned railway station in Victoria, Australia

Keilor East

General information
- Location: Terror Street, Keilor Park and Roberts Road, Airport West; Australia
- System: Planned PTV commuter rail station
- Owner: VicTrack (projected)
- Operator: Metro Trains (projected)
- Line: Melbourne Airport
- Platforms: 2
- Tracks: 4

Construction
- Structure type: Ground
- Parking: Yes
- Accessible: Yes—step free access

Other information
- Status: Planned
- Station code: KES
- Fare zone: Myki zone 2

History
- Opening: 2031 (planned)
- Electrified: 1500 V DC overhead

Services
Preceding station	Metro Trains	Following station
From opening
Sunshine towards Cranbourne or East Pakenham	Airport line (under construction)	Terminus
Post extension
Sunshine towards Cranbourne or East Pakenham	Airport line (under construction)	Melbourne Airport Terminus

Keilor East station is a planned railway station as a part of the Melbourne Airport railway line that will serve the suburbs of Keilor East, Keilor Park and Airport West. Initially scheduled to open in 2029, the project is facing extensive delays, with completion now expected from 2031.

== History ==
The Melbourne Airport Rail project plans to build a new Metro line through the north-west of Melbourne using the rail reservation currently used by the Albion-Jacana freight corridor. Since the announcement of the project, local councils have advocated for a station to be added to serve nearby suburbs, arguing the area is currently underserved by public transport.

In September 2022, the Victorian Government announced the project would add a station on the border of Keilor East and Airport West, connecting 150,000 people to the metropolitan rail network. According to media reports, the Government did not plan to include the new station in the initial project, but after local advocacy and the public intervention of Public Transport Minister Ben Carroll in parliament, the project's business case was supplemented to add the station.

The Government's supplementary business case argued delivering the station at the same time as the link would save 15% compared with building the station after the line was operational.

In September 2026, both the state and federal Labor governments committed to bringing forward the completion of Keilor East by two years from 2033 to 2031, separate from the rest of the project.

== Platforms and services ==
The station will be situated along the Melbourne Airport rail link, as part of two planned stations along the line. Trains will run from Melbourne Airport to Keilor East before continuing to Sunshine, through the Metro Tunnel and then along the Pakenham and Cranbourne lines. Services are planned to run every ten minutes all-day.

Trains will take 6 minutes to travel to Melbourne Airport, 8 minutes to Sunshine, and 27 minutes to the Melbourne CBD.

From opening

Keilor East platform arrangement
Platform	Line	Destination	Via	Service Type
1	Airport line	Westall, Dandenong, East Pakenham, Cranbourne	Town Hall	Limited express services
2	Airport line	Westall, Dandenong, East Pakenham, Cranbourne	Town Hall	Limited express services

Extension to Melbourne Airport

Keilor East platform arrangement
Platform	Line	Destination	Via	Service Type
1	Airport line	Westall, Dandenong, East Pakenham, Cranbourne	Town Hall	Limited express services
2	Airport line	Melbourne Airport		All stations
