= Gary Young =

Gary Young may refer to:

- Gary Young (Australian musician) (born 1947), founding member of Australian rock band Daddy Cool
- Gary Young (footballer) (born 1958), Australian rules footballer
- Gary Young (drummer) (1953–2023), first drummer of the 1990s alternative rock band Pavement
- Gary Young (poet) (born 1951), American poet and printer
- Gary F. Young (born 1945), American politician from Idaho
- Gary Young (screenwriter), British screenwriter
- Gary Young (wrestler), American professional wrestler
- D. Gary Young (1949–2018), founder of Young Living Essential Oils
- Gary Young Jr., American stock car racing driver and team owner

== See also ==
- Gary Younge (born 1969), British journalist
- Garry Young (disambiguation)
