= Melbourne Airport railway station =

Planned railway station in Victoria, Australia

Melbourne Airport
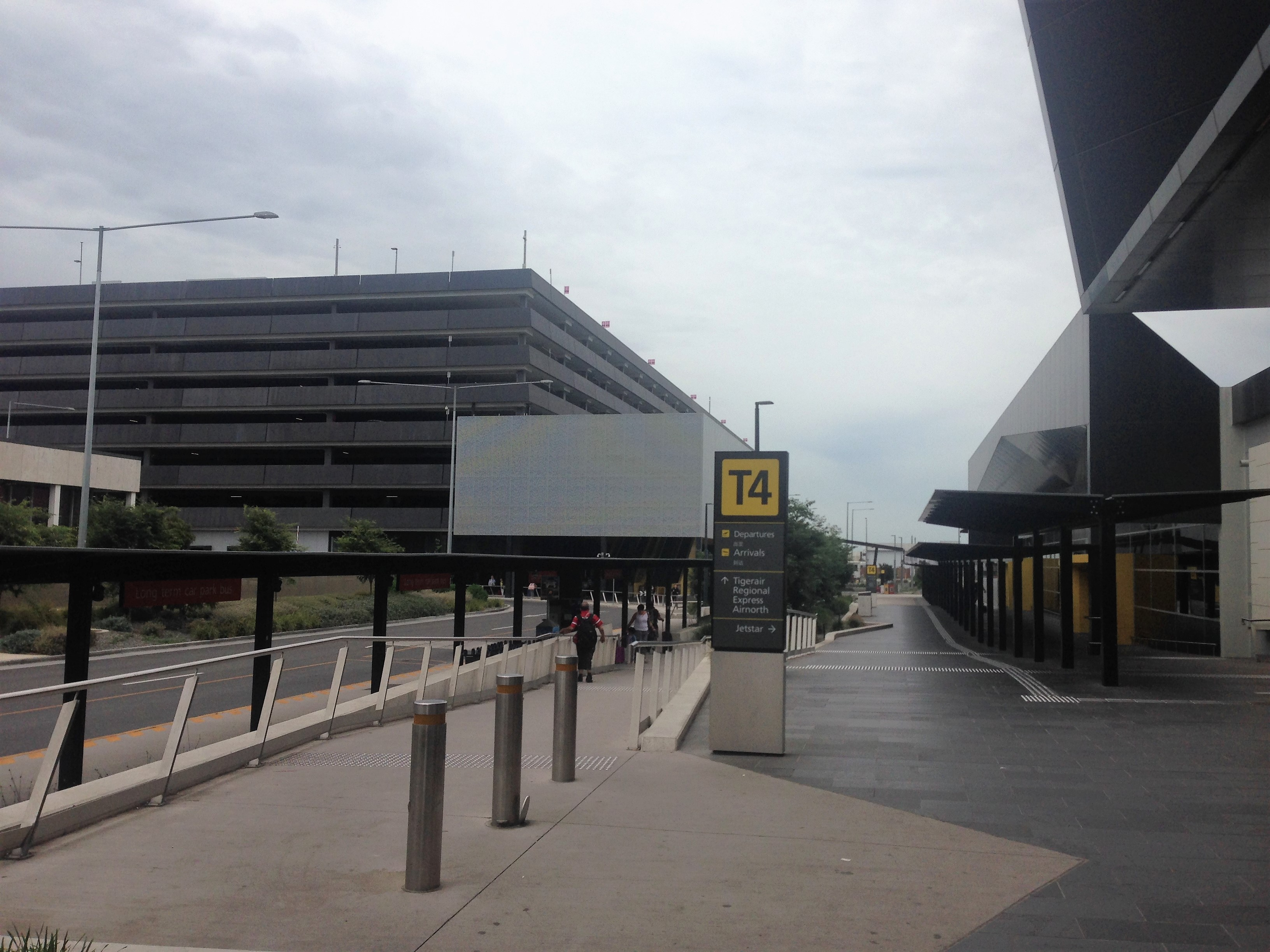
- Proposed station site near Terminal 4

General information
- Location: Melbourne Airport, Arrival Drive, Tullamarine; Australia
- Coordinates: 37.6722°S 144.8496°E (proposed)
- System: Planned PTV commuter rail station
- Owner: VicTrack (projected)
- Operator: Metro Trains Melbourne (projected)
- Line: Melbourne Airport
- Platforms: 2
- Tracks: 2
- Connections: Bus; SkyBus

Construction
- Structure type: TBD
- Parking: Yes
- Accessible: Yes—step free access

Other information
- Status: Planned, premium station

History
- Opening: 2033 (planned)

Services
Preceding station	Metro Trains	Following station
Keilor East towards East Pakenham or Cranbourne	Airport line (under construction)	Terminus
Location

Melbourne Airport station is a proposed railway station on the planned Melbourne Airport railway line that will serve Melbourne Airport. Initially scheduled to open in 2029, the project is facing extensive delays, with completion now expected from 2033.

== History ==
=== Project delays ===
Previously planned to open in 2029, in early 2023, media reports suggested there may be a delay in the construction of the airport link.

In May 2023, the state government also confirmed that contracting for further works on the airport rail link would be temporarily paused and no new contracts would be entered into until the completion of a major Commonwealth Government review of the country's infrastructure pipeline. In November 2023, following the review the federal government reaffirmed its matching $5 billion commitment towards the project.

=== Station design dispute ===
In September 2022, the state government announced that the airport station would be an elevated structure built near the terminals, rather than an underground station, as this would be quicker to build, cheaper and cause less disruption.

The airport operator, Australia Pacific Airports Corporation (APAC), has objected to the station being elevated, calling for the station to be underground in order to facilitate its plans for terminal expansion and improve connectivity to the proposed Suburban Rail Loop.

In May 2023, then Deputy Premier Jacinta Allan said slow and difficult negotiations with Melbourne Airport over the use of airport land for the station had caused more delays. In April 2024, an independent mediator was appointed by the federal government to resolve the ongoing dispute between the state government and the airport. In May 2024, Victorian Treasurer Tim Pallas confirmed in the state budget that the project would be delayed by at least four years, with completion not expected until 2033 at the earliest.

In July 2024, Melbourne Airport confirmed it was willing to work with the Victorian Government on the delivery of an above-ground station, however, the time taken to conduct the negotiations up to that point caused the project to be delayed until 2033, a four-year delay. The proposed site for the station is indicated as between Terminals 3 and 4 above the inbound motor vehicle roads. Concept art indicates elevated walkways to Terminals 3, 4, and a walkway towards Terminals 1 and 2 in front of the current PARKROYAL hotel and multi storey parking complex.

== Platforms and services ==
The station is part of the Melbourne Airport rail link which connects with the Metro Tunnel. Trains from the airport will travel via Sunshine, stations in the Melbourne CBD, and the Pakenham and Cranbourne lines.

Melbourne Airport platform arrangement
Platform	Line	Destination	Via	Service Type
1	Airport line	Westall, Dandenong, East Pakenham, Cranbourne	Town Hall	Limited express services
2	Airport line	Westall, Dandenong, East Pakenham, Cranbourne	Town Hall	Limited express services

== Transport links ==
CDC Melbourne operates three bus routes from Melbourne Airport station, under contract to Public Transport Victoria:

- 478 : to Airport West
- 479 : to Sunbury
- 482 : to Airport West (Peak hours only)

Kinetic Melbourne operates one bus route from Melbourne Airport Station, under contract to Public Transport Victoria:

- SmartBus 901 : Melbourne Airport – Frankston station

Skybus operates 4 express services from Melbourne Airport station:

- Melbourne City Express: Melbourne Airport – Southern Cross station
- Eastern Express: Melbourne Airport – Box Hill station
- Sunshine Express: Melbourne Airport - Sunshine
- Peninsula Express: Melbourne Airport - Frankston station
