= Garry Young =

Garry Young may refer to:

- Garry Young (footballer) (born 1939), former Australian rules footballer
- Garry Young (ice hockey) (1936–1994), executive and coach in the National Hockey League

== See also ==
- Gary Younge (born 1969), British journalist
- Gary Young (disambiguation)
