= Albion railway station, Melbourne =

Railway station in Melbourne, Australia

Albion
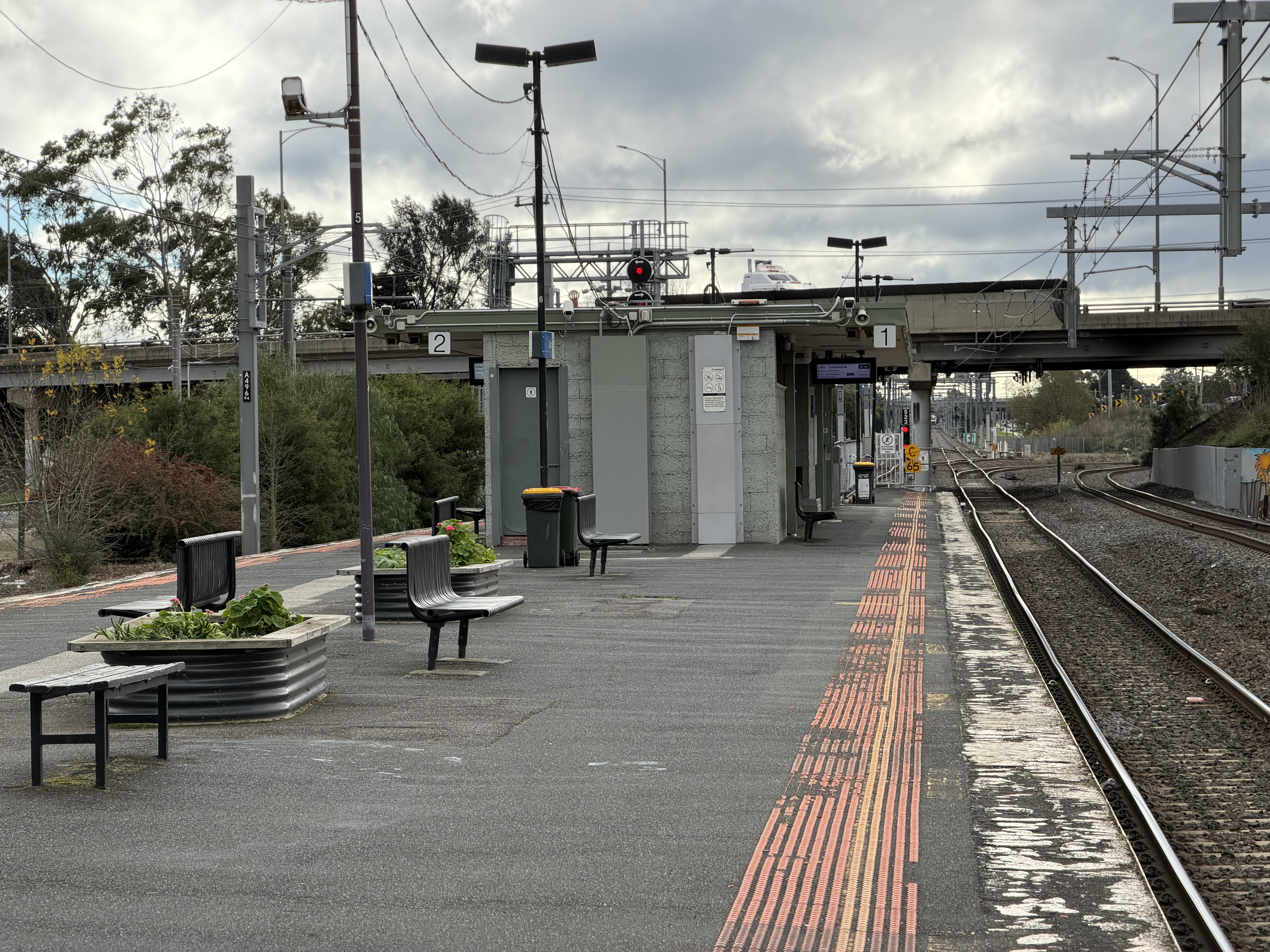
- North-west bound view from Platform 1, June 2026

General information
- Location: St Albans Road, Albion, Victoria 3020; City of Brimbank; Australia
- Coordinates: 37.7772°S 144.8244°E
- System: PTV commuter rail station
- Owner: VicTrack
- Operator: Metro Trains
- Line: Sunbury
- Distance: 13.65 kilometres from Southern Cross
- Platforms: 2 (1 island)
- Tracks: 4
- Connections: Bus

Construction
- Structure type: Ground
- Parking: 567
- Cycle facilities: 18
- Accessible: No—steep ramp

Other information
- Status: Operational, host station
- Station code: ALB
- Fare zone: Myki zone 1/2
- Website: Public Transport Victoria

History
- Opened: 5 January 1860; 166 years ago
- Closed: 1 January 1861
- Rebuilt: 24 March 1891; 24 November 1919; 1961
- Electrified: October 1921 (1500 V DC overhead)
- Former names: Albion and Darlington (1860-1861)

Passengers
- 2005–2006: 609,932
- 2006–2007: 706,570 ▲15.84%
- 2007–2008: 759,149 ▲7.44%
- 2008–2009: 785,147 ▲3.42%
- 2009–2010: 808,922 ▲3.02%
- 2010–2011: 802,370 ▼0.8%
- 2011–2012: 679,577 ▼15.3%
- 2012–2013: Not measured
- 2013–2014: 801,210 ▲17.89%
- 2014–2015: 796,442 ▼0.59%
- 2015–2016: 766,337 ▼3.77%
- 2016–2017: 660,670 ▼13.78%
- 2017–2018: 667,975 ▲1.1%
- 2018–2019: 686,100 ▲2.71%
- 2019–2020: 537,450 ▼21.66%
- 2020–2021: 204,500 ▼61.95%
- 2021–2022: 203,100 ▼0.68%
- 2022–2023: 336,250 ▲65.56%
- 2022–2023: 336,250 ▲65.56%
- 2023–2024: 433,100 ▲28.8%
- 2024–2025: 413,900 ▼4.43%

Services
Preceding station	Metro Trains	Following station
Sunshine towards Cranbourne or East Pakenham via Metro Tunnel	Sunbury line	Ginifer towards Watergardens or Sunbury
Track layout
Location

Albion station is a railway station operated by Metro Trains Melbourne on the Sunbury line, part of the Melbourne rail network. It serves the suburb of Albion, a western suburb of Melbourne, Victoria, Australia. Albion station is a ground level host station, featuring an island platform and a pedestrian underpass.

The Melbourne – Sydney standard gauge line passes to the east of the station and, along with the Albion – Jacana freight line, it branches off north of the station.

== History ==
The Melbourne & Murray River Railway (now known as the Bendigo line) opened in January 1859, with trains running from Footscray to Sunbury. On 5 January 1860, a station named Albion and Darlington, named after the surrounding area which was then known as Darlington and the nearby Albion Quarrying Company, opened on the railway at the site of the current Albion station. Albion and Darlington station, however, was in operation for only a year.

In 1891, after the construction of the nearby Braybrook Junction station in 1885, a new station, now simply named Albion, was opened further to the north-west of the Albion and Darlington site.

In 1919, Albion station was relocated again, this time back to its original, and current, site.

In 1961, the former Ballarat Road level crossing was grade separated, and was replaced with a road overpass, just north of the station. As part of the construction of the North East Standard Gauge line through the site in 1961, a new Albion station was built on the site of the old station. The new station consisted of an island platform and a new pebble-mix-coated building.

Up until 1961, the station had a signal box to control of the junction with the Albion – Jacana freight line, after which it was replaced by a signal panel, which was moved to the Sunshine signal box in 1965.

In 1972, both platforms were extended. In 2022, both platforms were again extended at the up end.

== Future ==
Albion station will be completely rebuilt as part of the Melbourne Airport Rail project.

In the first stage of the project, with construction to begin in 2028 and completed by 2030, the current Albion station will be demolished and a new station built slightly further to the south-east. The new station will include a pedestrian overpass with stairs and lifts, while the current pedestrian underpass will remain in place to preserve current walking routes in the suburb for local residents. Passenger access to the station will also be opened up to Ferguson St, Albion.

By 2033, in the second and final stage of the project, an 18-metre high railway flyover will be built above the station and across Ballarat Road, carrying airport trains from Sunshine station to the airport. Airport trains will be travelling high above Albion station on this flyover and will not stop there: thus, passengers boarding at Albion will have to travel one stop back to Sunshine station to board an airport train.

== Platforms and services ==
Albion has one island platform with two faces. It is served by Sunbury line trains.

=== Current ===
Albion platform arrangement
Platform	Line	Destination	Via	Service Type	Notes	Source
1	Sunbury line	Westall, Dandenong, East Pakenham, Cranbourne	Town Hall	All stations and limited express services	Services to Westall and Dandenong only operate during weekday peaks.	
2	Sunbury line	Watergardens, Sunbury		All stations		

== Transport links ==
Kinetic Melbourne operates two bus routes via Albion station, under contract to Public Transport Victoria:

- 215 : Caroline Springs – Highpoint Shopping Centre
- 426 : Caroline Springs – Sunshine station

Transit Systems Victoria operates one bus route via Albion station, under contract to Public Transport Victoria:

- 456 : Sunshine station – Woodgrove Shopping Centre (Melton)
