= East Keilor Football Club =

East Keilor
- Full name: East Keilor Football Club
- Nickname: The Cougars
- Sport: Australian rules football
- Founded: 1967
- League: Essendon District Football League
- Home ground: Overland Reserve, East Keilor
- Colours: Navy blue Red Gold
- President: Matthew Stivavla

East Keilor Football Club is an Australian rules football club located 16 km northwest of Melbourne in the suburb of East Keilor. The club was founded in 1967 as a junior club.

The Senior club was established in 1971 in B Grade and the club's first premiership was in 1978. The club's second B Grade premiership was in 1992. The club won Senior Division 2 premierships in 2012, 2014 and 2016.

After losing the A Grade grand final in 1993 the club's won its only A Grade premiership in 1994.

The club fields eight under-age teams. The club has won 28 junior premierships.

== Senior Premierships (7) ==
1978 - B Grade

1992 - B Grade

1994 - A Grade

2014 - C Grade

2014 - Division 2

2016 - Division 2

2021 - Division 1

== Notable AFL footballers ==
- Mark Harvey – Essendon
- Gary Young – Essendon
- Rohan Welsh – Carlton
- David Calthorpe – Essendon and Brisbane Lions
- Matthew Hogg – Footscray and Carlton
- Glenn Manton – Essendon and Carlton
- Troy Moloney – Footscray
- Mark Athorn - Footscray, Fitzroy, Sydney and Carlton
- Ashley Fernee - Adelaide

== Books ==
- History of football in Melbourne's north west – John Stoward - ISBN 9780980592924
