= Brian Moloney =

Australian rules footballer

Personal information
- Full name: Brian Moloney
- Born: 4 August 1937
- Height: 178 cm (5 ft 10 in)
- Weight: 79 kg (174 lb)

Playing career^{1}
Years	Club	Games (Goals)
1957–59	Footscray	17 (1)
- ^{1} Playing statistics correct to the end of 1959.

Brian Moloney (born 4 August 1937) is a former Australian rules footballer who played with Footscray in the Victorian Football League (VFL).
