= Sunshine railway station =

Railway station in Melbourne, Australia

Sunshine
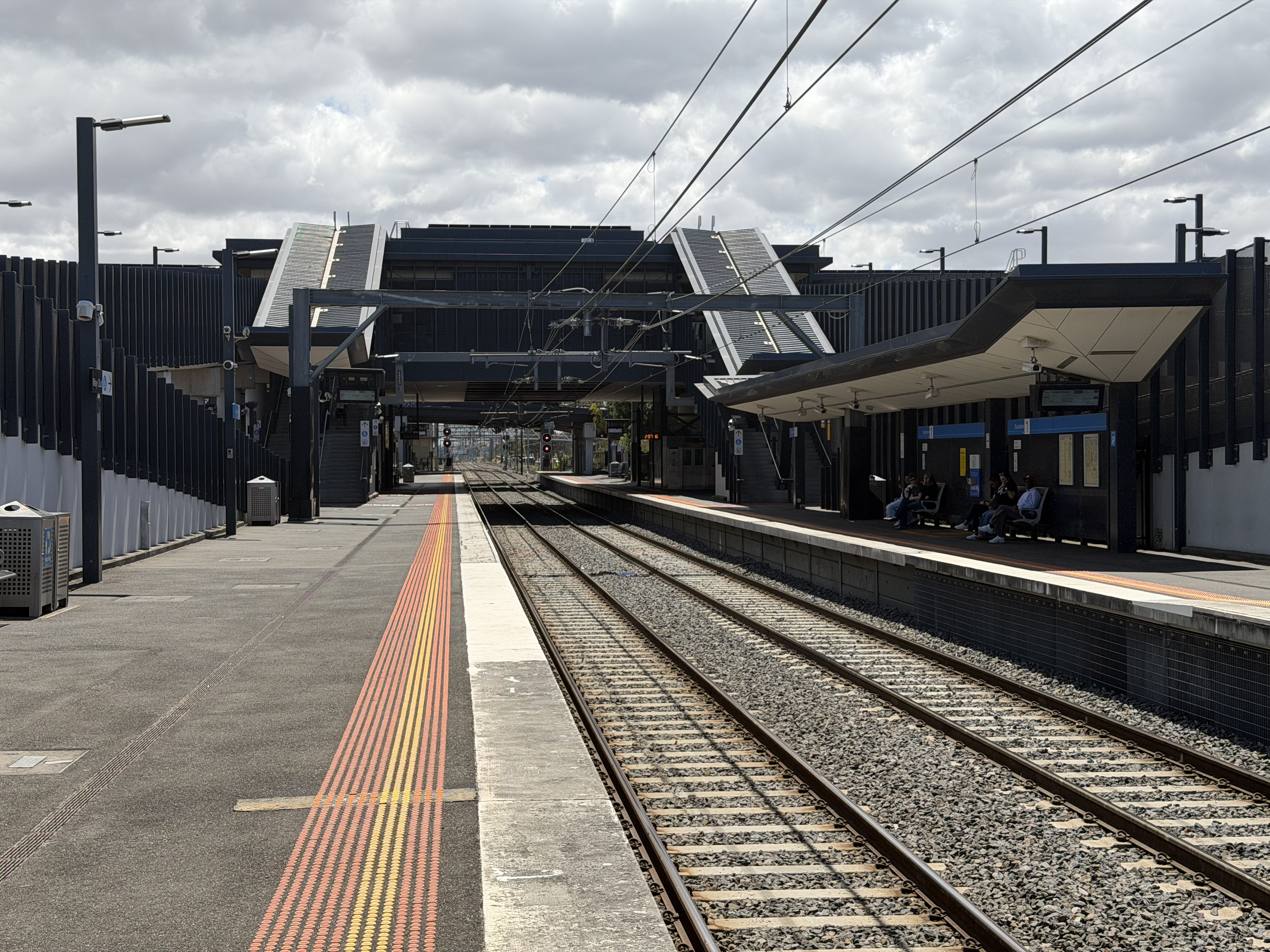
- North-west view from Platform 2, January 2026

General information
- Location: Station Place, Sunshine, Victoria 3020; City of Brimbank; Australia
- Coordinates: 37°47′17″S 144°49′57″E
- System: PTV (Metro and V/Line)
- Owner: VicTrack
- Operator: Metro Trains
- Lines: Sunbury (Deniliquin); Ballarat Ararat Maryborough Geelong (Ararat)
- Distance: 12.25 kilometres from Southern Cross
- Platforms: 4 (1 island, 2 side)
- Tracks: 5
- Connections: Bus; SkyBus

Construction
- Structure type: Ground
- Parking: 250
- Cycle facilities: Yes
- Accessible: Yes—step free access

Other information
- Status: Operational, premium station
- Station code: SUN
- Fare zone: Myki Zone 1/2 overlap
- Website: Public Transport Victoria

History
- Opened: 7 September 1885; 141 years ago
- Rebuilt: 28 April 2014
- Electrified: October 1921 (1500 V DC overhead)
- Former names: Braybrook Junction (1885–1907)

Passengers
- 2020–2021: 896,350 ▼48.87%
- 2021–2022: 1,235,800 ▲37.87%
- 2022–2023: 1,635,650 ▲32.4%
- 2023–2024: 1,830,400 ▲11.9%
- 2024–2025: 1,577,600 ▼13.8%
- Rank: 15 of 222

Services
Preceding station	Metro Trains	Following station
Tottenham towards Cranbourne or East Pakenham via Metro Tunnel	Sunbury line	Albion towards Watergardens or Sunbury
V/Line services
Preceding station	V/Line	Following station
Footscray towards Southern Cross	Ballarat line	Ardeer towards Melton, Ballarat, Ararat or Maryborough
Footscray towards Southern Cross	Melton line	Ardeer towards Melton, Ballarat, Ararat or Maryborough
Footscray towards Southern Cross	Ararat line	Ardeer towards Melton, Ballarat, Ararat or Maryborough
Footscray towards Southern Cross	Maryborough line	Ardeer towards Melton, Ballarat, Ararat or Maryborough
Footscray towards Southern Cross	Geelong line	Deer Park towards Waurn Ponds
Bendigo line does not stop here
Future services
Preceding station	Metro Trains	Following station
West Footscray towards Cranbourne or East Pakenham via Metro Tunnel	Airport line (under construction)	Keilor East towards Melbourne Airport
West Footscray towards Cranbourne or East Pakenham via Metro Tunnel	Melton line	Ardeer towards Melton
Track layout
Location

Sunshine railway station is a railway station operated by Metro Trains Melbourne and V/Line on the Sunbury, Geelong and Ballarat lines, serving the western suburb of the same name in Melbourne, Victoria, Australia. The station opened on 7 September 1885, with the current station opening in 2014, after reconstruction as part of the Regional Rail Link project.

V/Line services on the Bendigo corridor pass through the station but do not stop there. Freight services running towards northern Victoria and Sydney run past the station, as well as freight trains heading for the western standard gauge line via the Newport–Sunshine railway line. The bus interchange at the station is a hub for a large number of routes to surrounding suburbs.

It is planned that the station will receive a significant upgrade as part of the Melbourne Airport Rail project, with work scheduled to commence in early 2026.

== History ==
=== 19th century ===
In the 1850s, the Melbourne, Mount Alexander and Murray River Railway Company began building a line from Footscray to Bendigo. The company encountered financial difficulties and was sold to the Victorian Government in 1856. No station had yet been built on the current site of Sunshine station when the line opened in 1859, which then operated only as far as Sunbury: the closest station in the area was Albion and Darlington on the site of the current Albion station.

In 1874, a line to Melton was opened, which branched from the Bendigo line at the location of the current Sunshine station. On 7 September 1885, a station was opened at this junction and named Braybrook Junction, being in the then Shire of Braybrook. In 1887, the Melton railway was extended westwards to Bacchus Marsh, eventually meeting up with a line that had been built eastwards from Ballarat in 1889. This created the first direct route from Melbourne to Ballarat, whereas previously rail traffic between Melbourne and Ballarat had to run first to Geelong and then onwards to Ballarat via the Geelong-Ballarat line.

In 1887, the Newport-Sunshine railway line was opened, connecting the new station at Braybrook Junction to Newport and Williamstown, Victoria's major cargo port at the time.

=== 20th century ===
In 1907, Braybrook Junction station was renamed Sunshine station. This was after industrialist H. V. McKay had moved his Sunshine Harvester Works in 1904 to a factory site near to the station and in 1906 began selling land in a new nearby residential estate called the Sunshine Estate to allow his workers to purchase homes near to his factory. As a result, the station, the local post office and the shire riding were all renamed Sunshine in July 1907.

On 20 April 1908, Sunshine was the scene of the Sunshine train disaster, the worst train crash in Victorian railway history. 44 people were killed and over 400 were injured.

In 1929, the Albion–Jacana goods line was opened, connecting Sunshine with the North East line, allowing freight trains to avoid the steeper grades and suburban traffic on the suburban line between North Melbourne, Essendon and Broadmeadows.

The road level crossing at Sunshine was removed when grade separation was carried out in 1961. The works took place as part of the project to construct a standard gauge line from Sydney to Melbourne. In that same year, boom barriers were provided at the nearby former Anderson Road level crossing, on the Bendigo line.

In January 1963, a fourth platform was provided on the adjacent Melbourne – Sydney standard gauge line, to enable passengers to transfer between the interstate Sydney and Adelaide expresses. The platform was constructed with steel framing and timber decking, and was 270 ft (82 m) long, sufficient for four interstate passenger carriages. It was only 7 ft 6 in (2.29 m) wide, and about 3 ft (0.91 m) lower than the adjacent broad gauge platforms but connected to the rear of Platform 1 by a 15 ft (4.6 m) wide ramp. By February 1964 the platform had been doubled in length, widening of the base of the original ramp and provision of a second, parallel ramp.

In 1965, control of signals at Albion was transferred to the signal box at Sunshine. Also in that year, the Grain Elevator Board sidings, that serve the nearby grain silos, opened for traffic. In 1976, a signal panel was provided to replace an existing panel and, in 1977, boom barriers were provided at the nearby former Anderson Road level crossing, on the Serviceton line.

White City was a station located between Sunshine and Tottenham. It closed on 4 October 1981 and has been removed.

On 5 February 1985, Harris trailer carriage 830T was destroyed by fire in a vandalism attack, whilst stabled in the former down end siding.

In 1988, the sidings leading to the Massey Ferguson factory were booked out of use. The lead to the sidings, which crossed the standard gauge line, was removed in February of that year.

In 1994, the former station underpass, which connected the platforms to nearby City Place, was completed, replacing an underpass. It was removed during the station upgrades between 2012 and 2014. Also in that year, the track leading to the former goods shed was removed, and a number of semaphore signals were replaced with automatic colour signals.

On 26 July 1996, Sunshine was upgraded to a premium station.

=== 21st century ===
In mid-2004, the platform on the standard gauge line was removed. The waiting room on the platform was demolished five years earlier, in 1999.

From 2012 to 2014, the station was rebuilt as part of the Regional Rail Link project. Works included:

- a new bus interchange, completed in September 2013;
- construction of a new footbridge and concourse, completed in January 2014;
- upgrading Platforms 1 and 2 with new canopies;
- rebuilding Platform 3 and a new Platform 4, both completed in April 2014;

The standalone signal box to the north of the station, commissioned in 1914, was closed in 2016, and control of trains in the Sunshine and Albion areas was transferred to Metrol. The former signal box is one of the largest surviving examples of a tappet and lever frame box on the Victorian network, having once housed 80 levers. Although mechanical signalling was replaced with electronic interlocking before the box was finally taken out of service, it remains relatively intact as an example of Victorian Railways signal box architecture.

In early 2020, construction commenced on a new signal control centre south of the station, which will share control of the Sunshine–Dandenong corridor with an existing facility at Dandenong, after completion of the Metro Tunnel.

From 9 November 2025, SkyBus began operating a direct service from the station to Melbourne Airport.

== Future ==
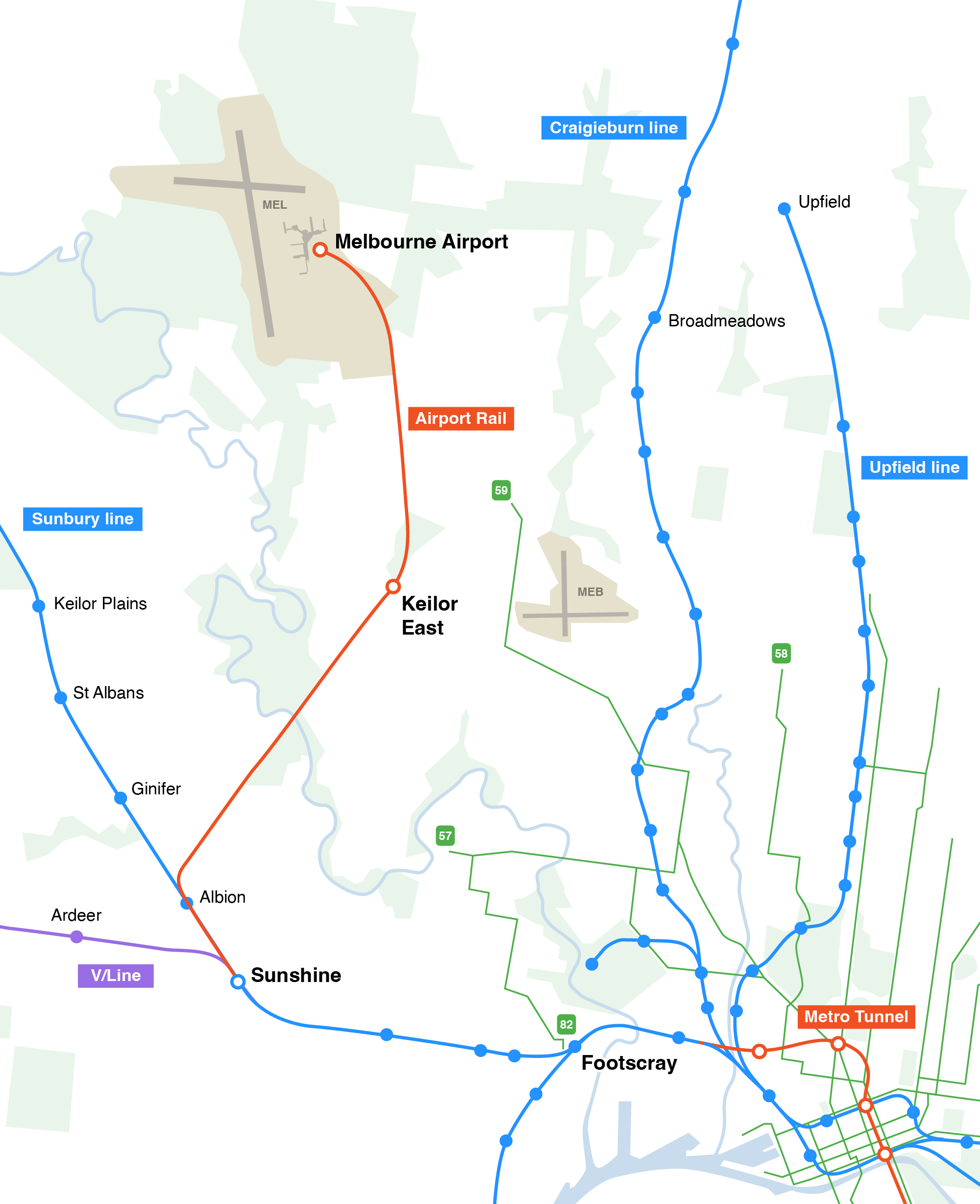
Map showing the Melbourne Airport Rail link route.

In 2018, the Victorian Government announced that the Melbourne Airport Rail project would operate via Sunshine. The state government announced a significant package of upgrades for the station, branding it the Sunshine Superhub. Works at Sunshine are planned to commence in early 2026, after a combined $4 billion of funding was announced by the Australian Government and the Victorian Government in 2025.

In 2022, early construction commenced on the Melbourne Airport Rail project, and a masterplan for the station's precinct was released. The plan includes new entrances to the station, an integrated bus interchange, new open spaces, high-density housing developments surrounding the station, and the creation of pedestrian and cycling links across the rail lines.

Within Sunshine station itself, works will include a new pair of platforms for Geelong and Ballarat services, an extension of the station's concourse, new rail bridges, new signalling, and a major reconfiguration of the passenger and freight tracks.

A track diagram was released in 2025 depicting the planned reconfiguration. Regional passenger V/Line trains on the Bendigo line, which currently run express through Sunshine, will stop at the Sunshine Superhub using the existing Sunbury line platforms. The Airport line, as well as the future planned electrified Melton line, will run through the Metro Tunnel. Quadruplication of the Melton line is planned to occur to a junction site near Caroline Springs to separate the Melton line from Ballarat services.

== Facilities, platforms and services ==
Sunshine is a ground level, premium station. It has two side platforms and a centre island platform with two faces. Access to the platforms is by stairs, lifts and ramps from an overhead footbridge and concourse, which includes a customer service window, an enclosed waiting room and toilets.

It is served by Sunbury line and V/Line Ballarat and Geelong line trains.

=== Current (Metropolitan) ===
Sunshine platform arrangement
Platform	Line	Destination	Via	Service Type	Notes	Source
1	Sunbury line	Westall, Dandenong, East Pakenham or Cranbourne	Town Hall	All stations and limited express services	Services to Westall and Dandenong only operate during weekday peaks.	
2	Sunbury line	Watergardens or Sunbury		All stations		

=== Current (Regional) ===
Sunshine platform arrangement
Platform	Line	Destination	Service Type	Notes
3	Ballarat line Ararat line Maryborough line Geelong line	Southern Cross	V/Line regional services	Set-down only
4	Ballarat line Ararat line Maryborough line Geelong line	Melton, Bacchus Marsh, Wendouree, Ararat, Wyndham Vale, Geelong or Waurn Ponds	V/Line regional services	Pick-up only

== Sunshine bus interchange ==
Sunshine bus interchange at Sunshine station is the fifth biggest bus interchange in suburban Melbourne with fourteen bus routes.

CDC Melbourne operates three routes via Sunshine station, under contract to Public Transport Victoria:

- 400 : to Laverton station (via Robinsons Road, shared with Transit Systems Victoria)
- 408 : St Albans station – Highpoint Shopping Centre
- 410 : to Footscray (via Ballarat Road)

Kinetic Melbourne operates four routes via Sunshine station, under contract to Public Transport Victoria:

- 216 : to Melbourne CBD (Queen Street) (via Dynon Road)
- 220 : to Melbourne CBD (Queen Street) via (Footscray Road)
- 429 : to Sunshine South (loop service)
- SmartBus 903 : Altona station – Mordialloc

Transit Systems Victoria operates eight routes to and from Sunshine station, under contract to Public Transport Victoria:

- 400 : to Laverton station (via Robinsons Road, shared with CDC Melbourne)
- 420 : to Watergardens station (via Deer Park)
- 422 : to Brimbank Central Shopping Centre
- 427 : to Sunshine West (via Forrest Street)
- 428 : to Sunshine West
- 456 : to Woodgrove Shopping Centre (Melton) (via Rockbank)
- 471 : to Williamstown (via Newport and Altona Gate Shopping Centre)
- Night Bus 941 : to Watergardens station (Saturday and Sunday mornings only)

=== SkyBus ===
A SkyBus service, dubbed by the operator as the Sunshine Express, has been in operation between Sunshine station to Melbourne Airport since November 2025. As of November 2026, buses depart every 30 minutes from Bay 6 of the Sunshine bus interchange at Sunshine station and the journey takes approximately 30 to 38 minutes.

== Gallery ==
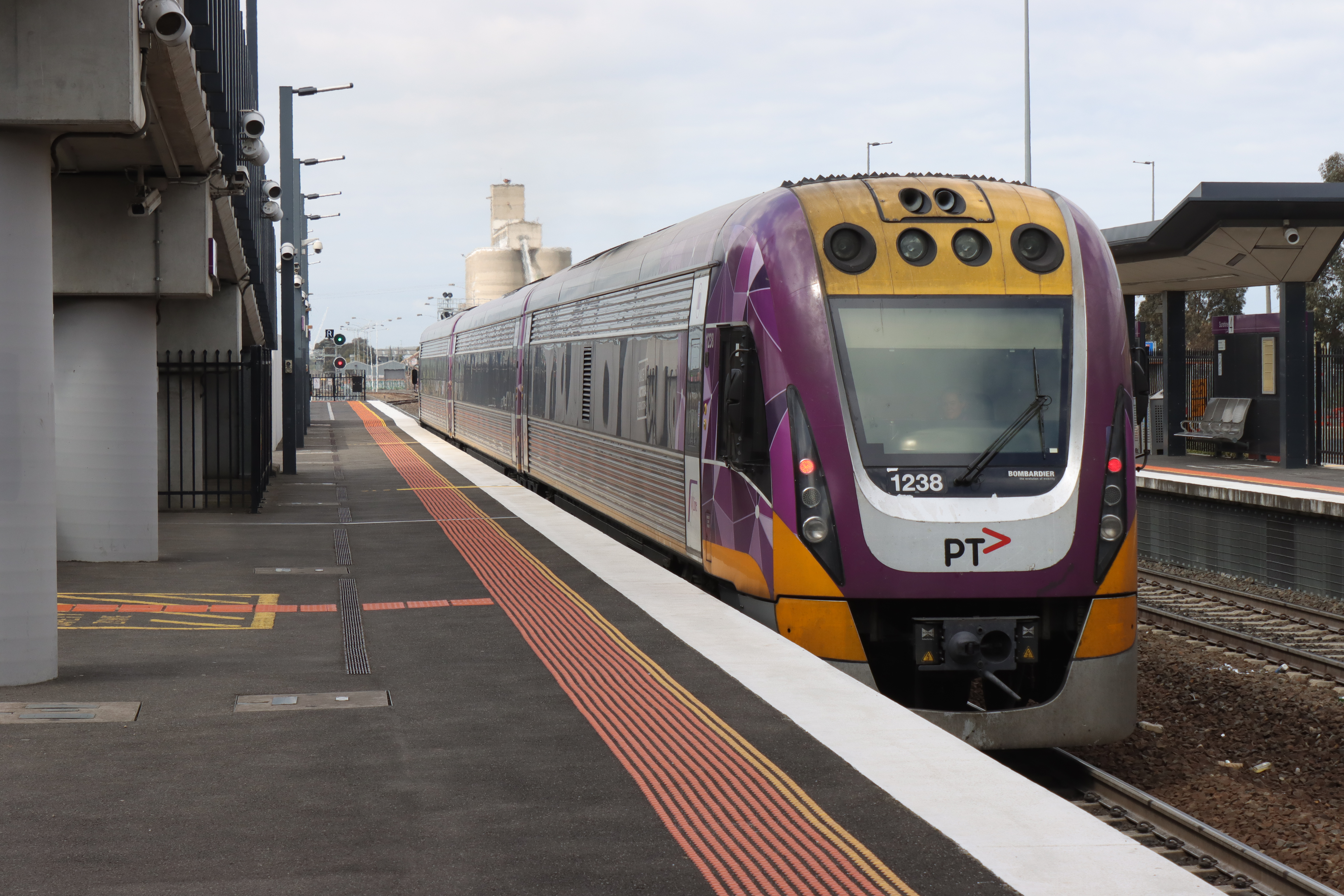
V/Line VLocity train departing Platform 3 towards Southern Cross Station at Sunshine Station in October 2023.

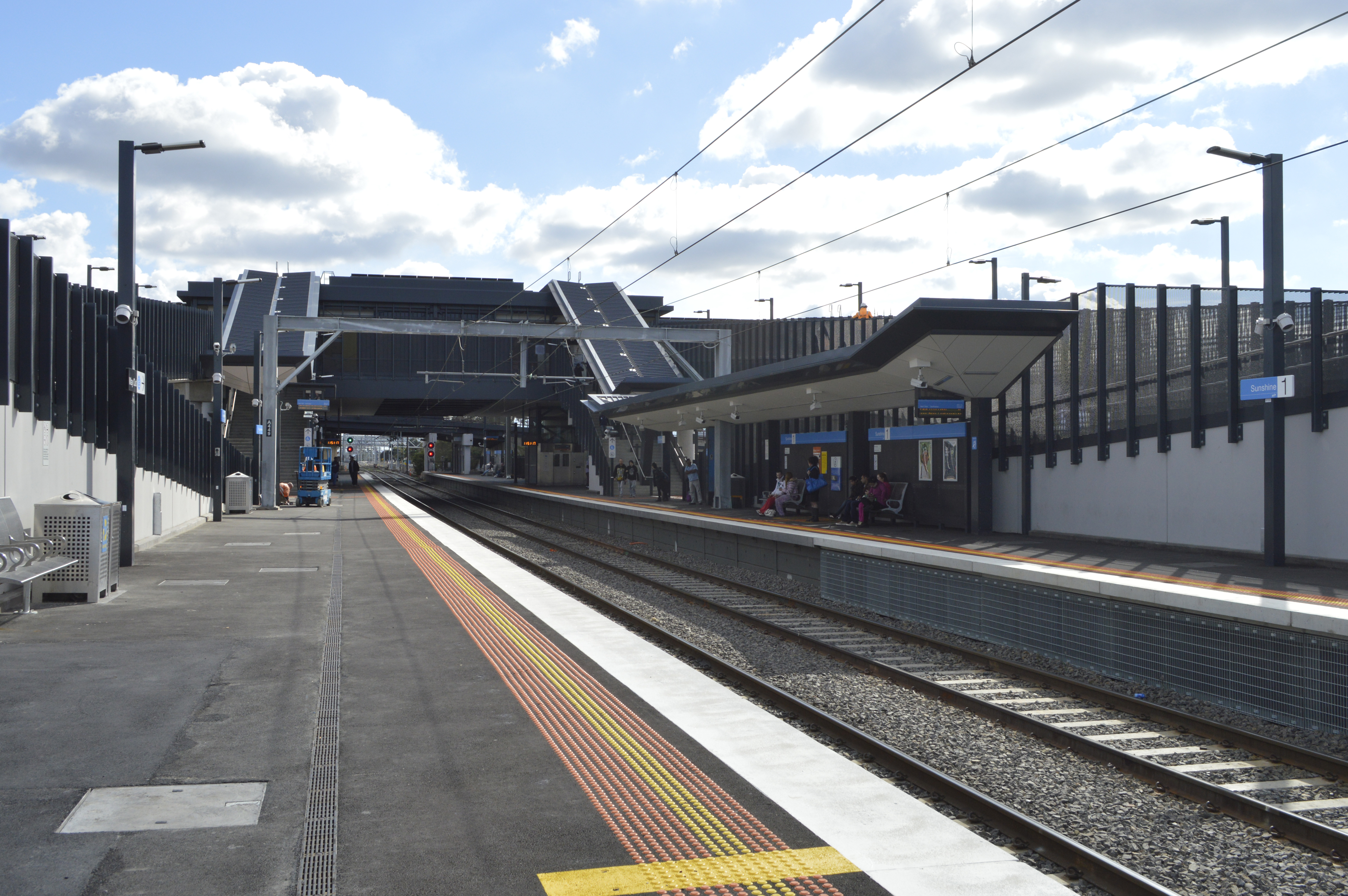
North-west bound view from Platform 2,
May 2014

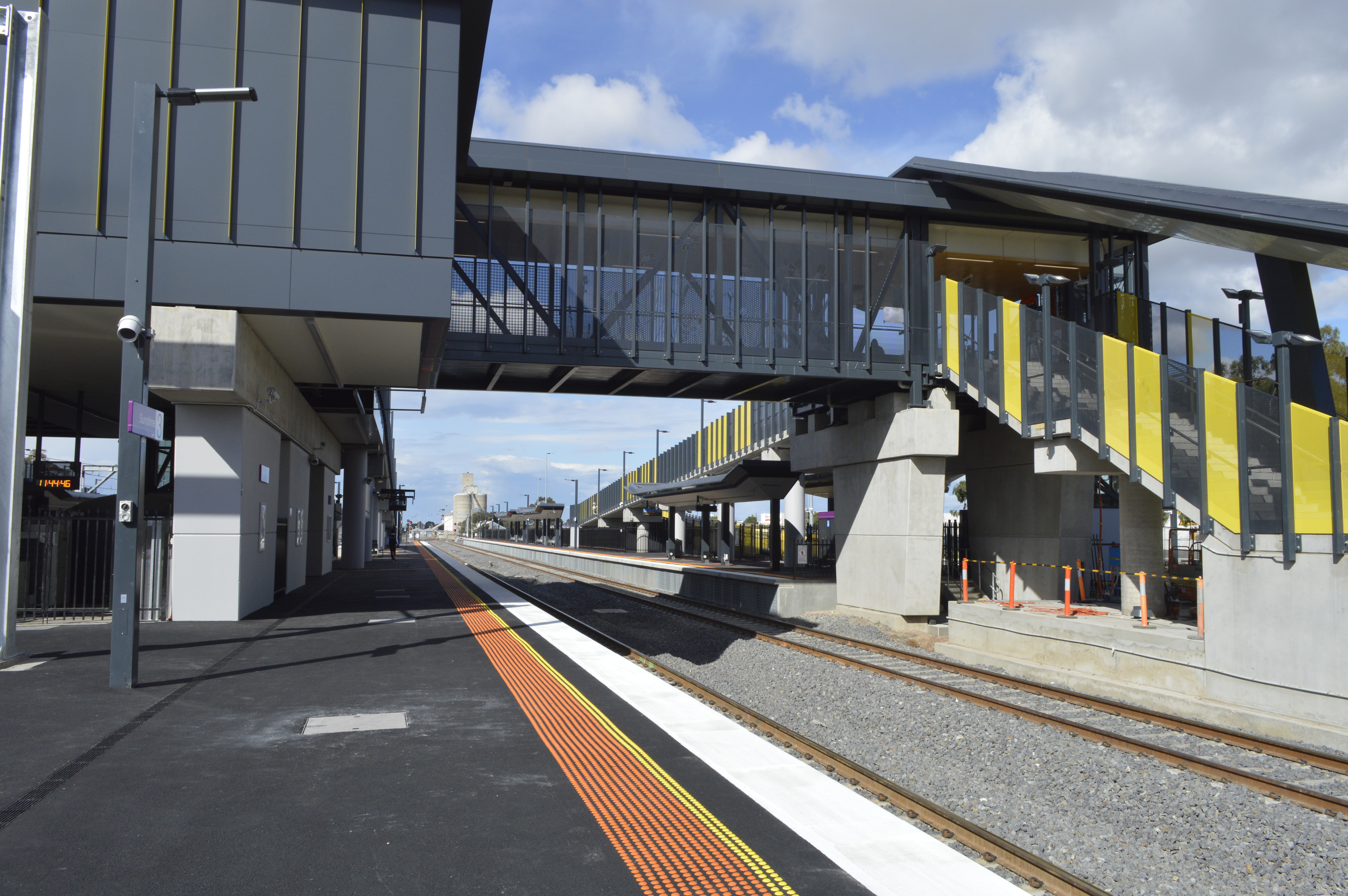
South-east bound view from Platform 3 looking at station concourse and entrance, May 2014

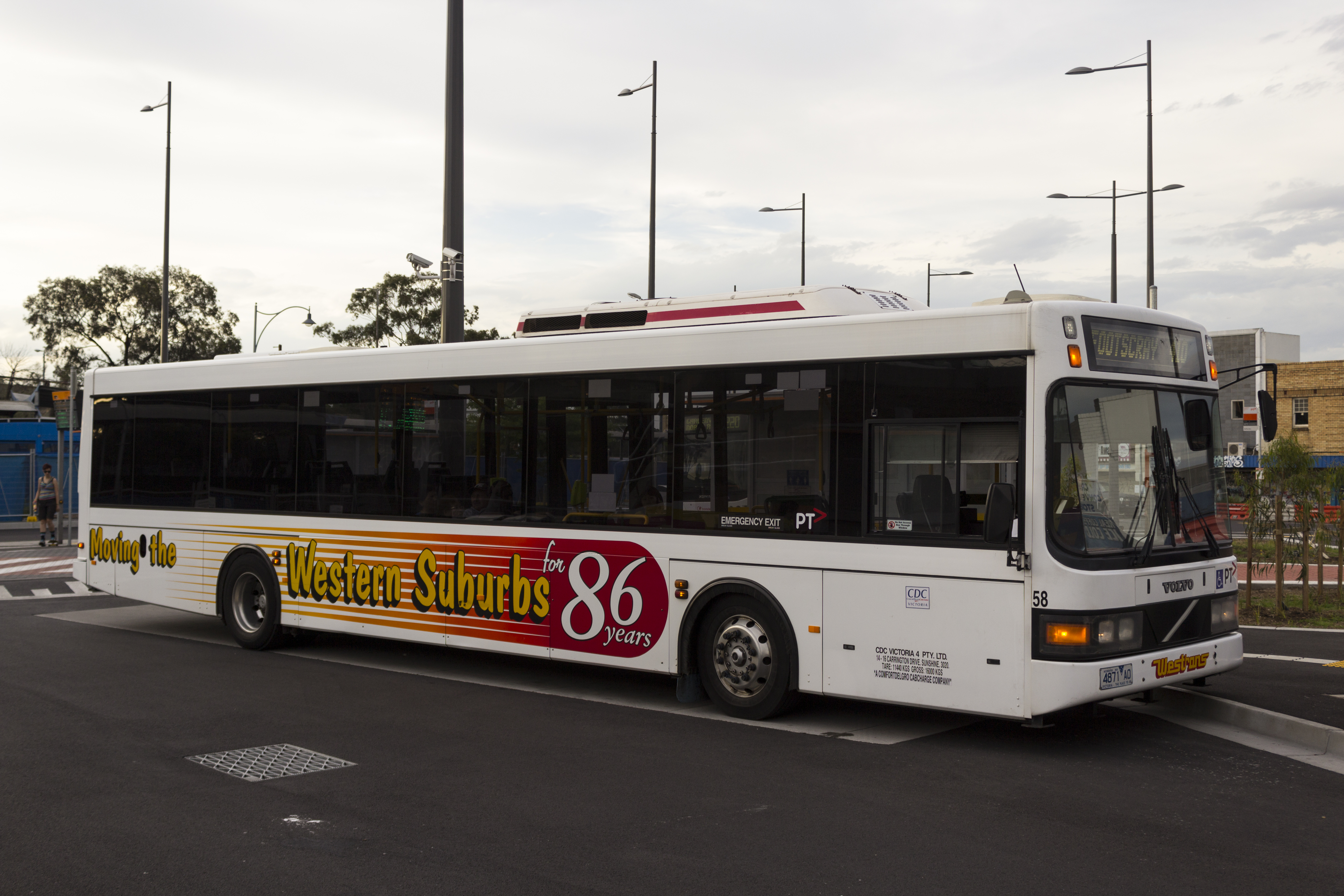
Westrans Volgren bodied Volvo B7L at Sunshine bus station, December 2013
