= Albion Viaduct =

Rail bridge over the Maribyrnong River, in Melbourne, Victoria, Australia

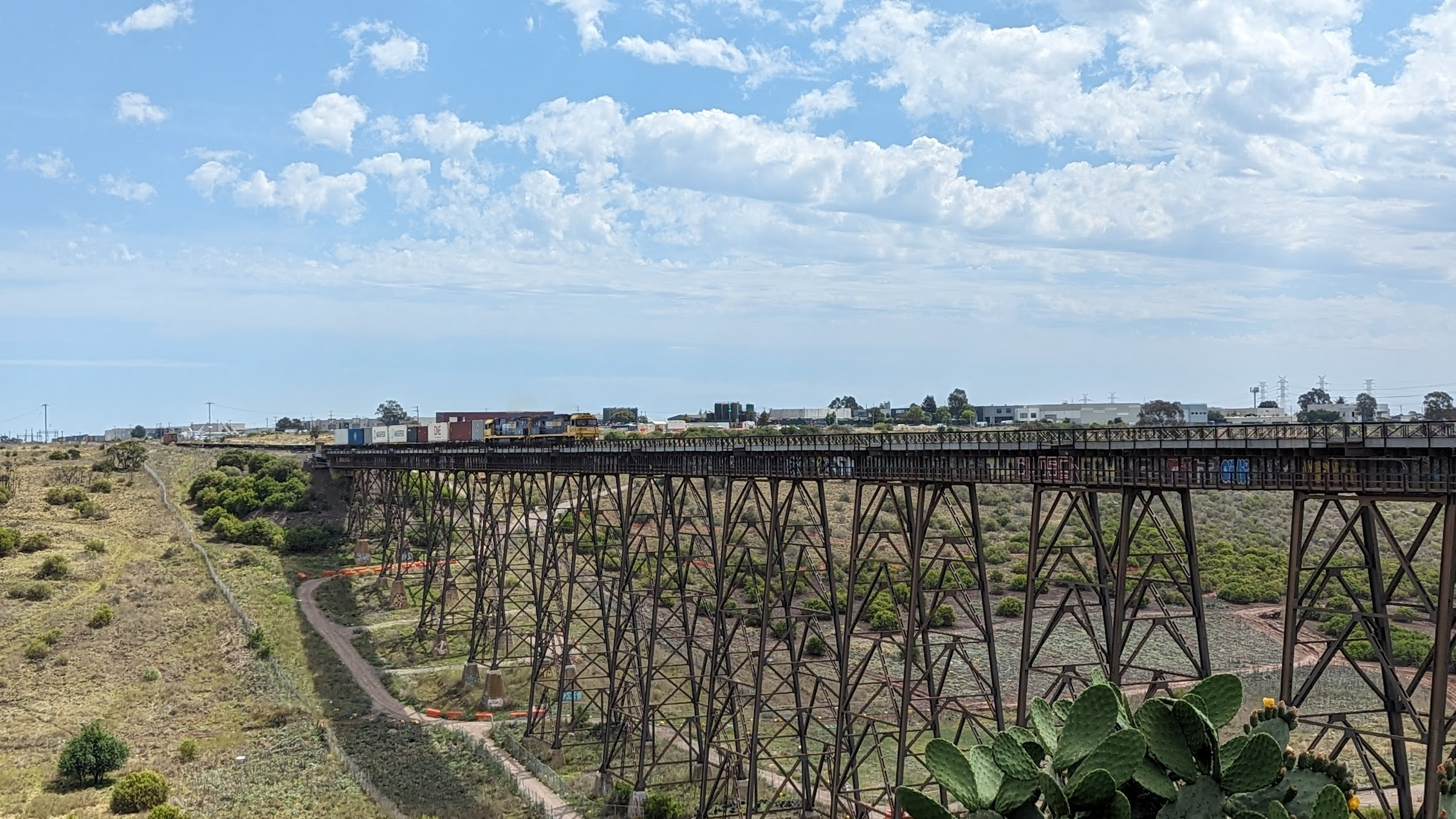
- Bridge viewed from the eastern lookout
- Coordinates: 37°44′49″S 144°50′47″E
- Carries: Albion–Jacana railway line
- Crosses: Maribyrnong River; Maribyrnong River Trail
- Begins: Keilor East (east)
- Ends: Sunshine North (west)
- Official name: Maribyrnong River Viaduct
- Other name: Quarter Mile Bridge
- Owner: ARTC
- Preceded by: M80 Western Ring Road
- Followed by: Solomons Ford (pedestrians only)

Characteristics
- Design: Trestle bridge
- Material: Steel
- Total length: 383 m (1,257 ft)
- Height: 55 m (180 ft)
- No. of spans: 25

Rail characteristics
- No. of tracks: 2
- Track gauge: Standard gauge

History
- Constructed by: Victorian Railways
- Construction start: 1927
- Construction end: June 1929; 97 years ago

Victorian Heritage Register
- Official name: Albion Viaduct
- Type: Registered place
- Designated: 19 September 1996
- Reference no.: H1197
- Heritage overlay nos.: HO05; HO107
- Category: Transport - Rail

Location
- Interactive map of Albion Viaduct

The Albion Viaduct, officially the Maribyrnong River Viaduct, and also known locally as the Quarter Mile Bridge, is a trestle viaduct across the Maribyrnong River and Maribyrnong River Trail that carries the Albion–Jacana railway line, located in the inner western suburbs of Melbourne, in Victoria, Australia. It is located near the E J Whitten Bridge, and is almost 400 metres (1,300 ft) long (hence the Quarter Mile name).

Completed in 1929, the viaduct was added to the Victorian Heritage Register on 19 September 1996 in recognition of its scientific, architectural and historical importance.

== History ==
It was built in 1927–29 by the Victorian Railways Construction Branch to carry a new double track goods line over the Maribyrnong River. The new line enabled trains from all parts of the state, except Gippsland, to have direct access to the Tottenham marshalling and sorting yards, and relieved congestion at the Melbourne Yard.

At the time of its opening, it was the largest trestle bridge in Australia. The viaduct is scientifically and architecturally important on account of its large size, and for the adoption of unusual cost effective design features such as the use of two girders per span to carry the double track, the use of K bracing in the towers, and the use of broad flange beams as columns. Until the completion of the Sydney Harbour Bridge, the viaduct was also the highest railway bridge in Australia. It employed 200 people during its construction, with one fatality.

In 2021, the Victorian Government unveiled plans for the route of the proposed Melbourne Airport Rail that included a new crossing of the river, via a 550-metre (1,804 ft) elevated rail bridge, located adjacent to the Albion Viaduct. The government invited tenders in September 2021, and the contract was awarded to FCC Construction Australia and Winslow Infrastructure in October 2022 and work commenced shortly thereafter.

== Description ==
Comprising 25 spans, the viaduct is 383 metres (1,257 ft) long between abutments and 55 metres (180 ft) above water level; and is the second-highest bridge in Victoria after the West Gate Bridge, which is 58 metres (190 ft) high. The structure comprises two steel girders supported on twelve steel framed towers.

The main traffic over the bridge is freight services, but it also carries two passenger services, the Melbourne to Sydney NSW TrainLink XPT, and the Melbourne-Albury V/Line service which now runs on standard gauge.

An internal and external walkway spans the length of the bridge on both sides.

== Gallery ==
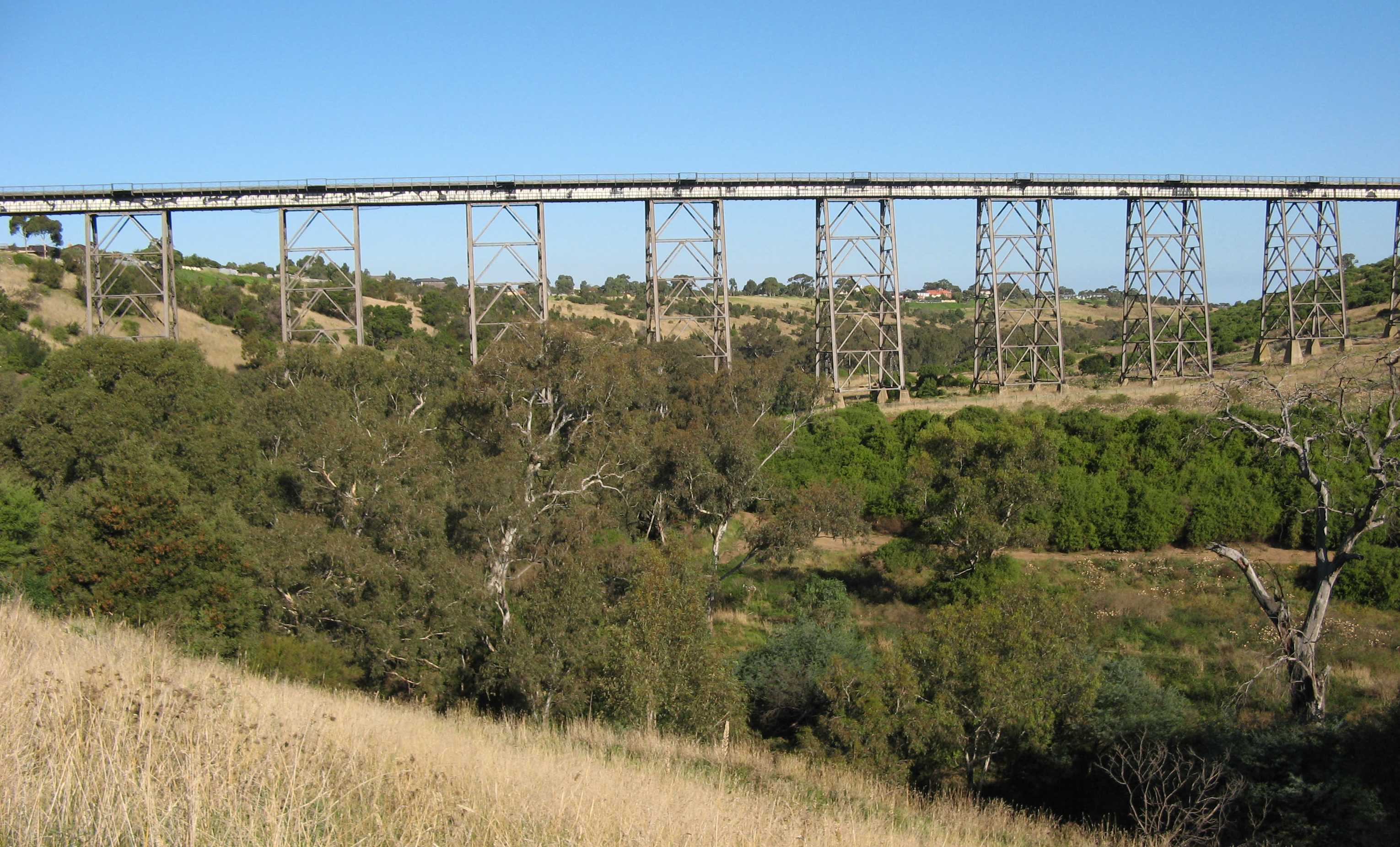
The viaduct in 2012

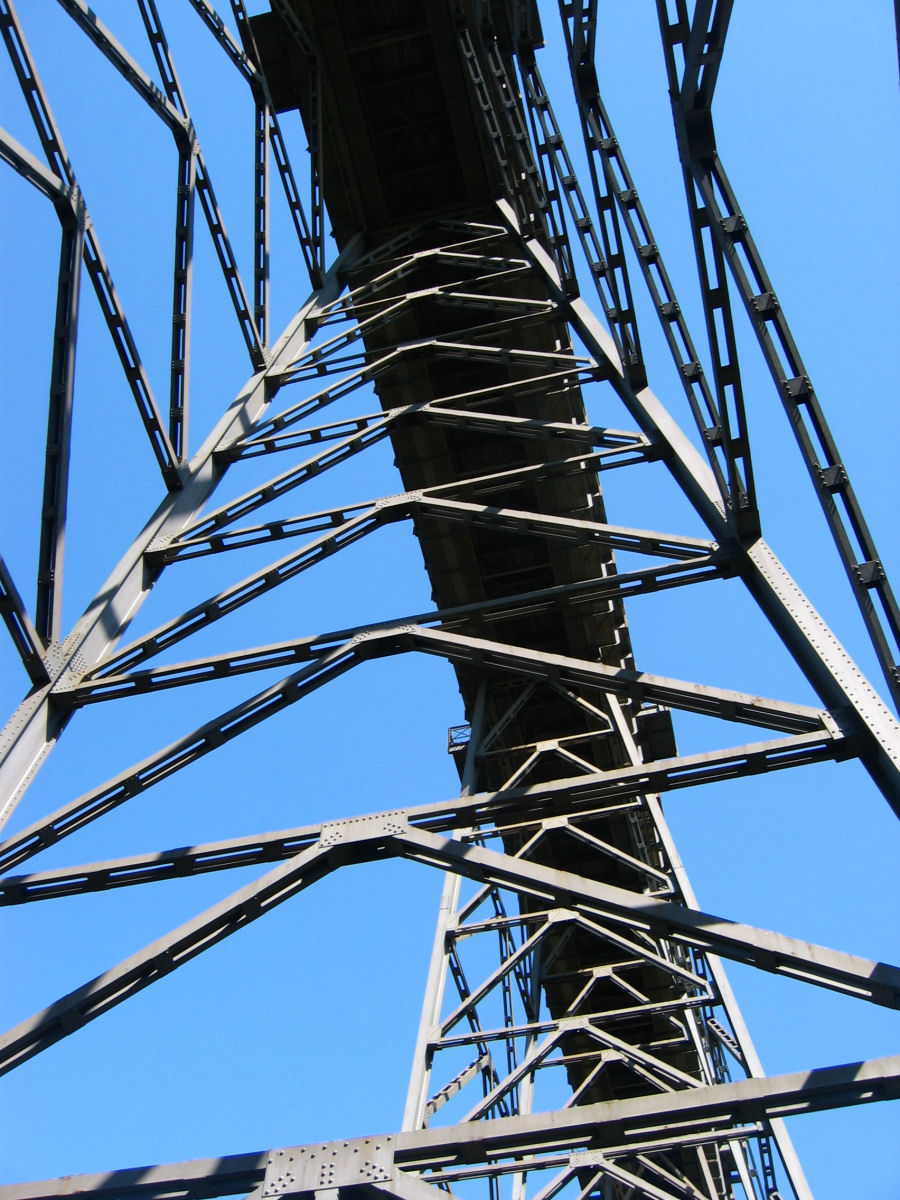
Inside one of the trestles

== See also ==
- List of bridges in Melbourne
- List of places on the Victorian Heritage Register in the City of Brimbank
- List of places on the Victorian Heritage Register in the City of Moonee Valley
