= Troy Moloney =

Australian rules footballer

Personal information
- Born: 18 May 1966 (age 60)
- Original team: East Keilor
- Height: 175 cm (5 ft 9 in)
- Weight: 76 kg (168 lb)

Playing career^{1}
Years	Club	Games (Goals)
1987–1992	Footscray	36 (4)
- ^{1} Playing statistics correct to the end of 1992.

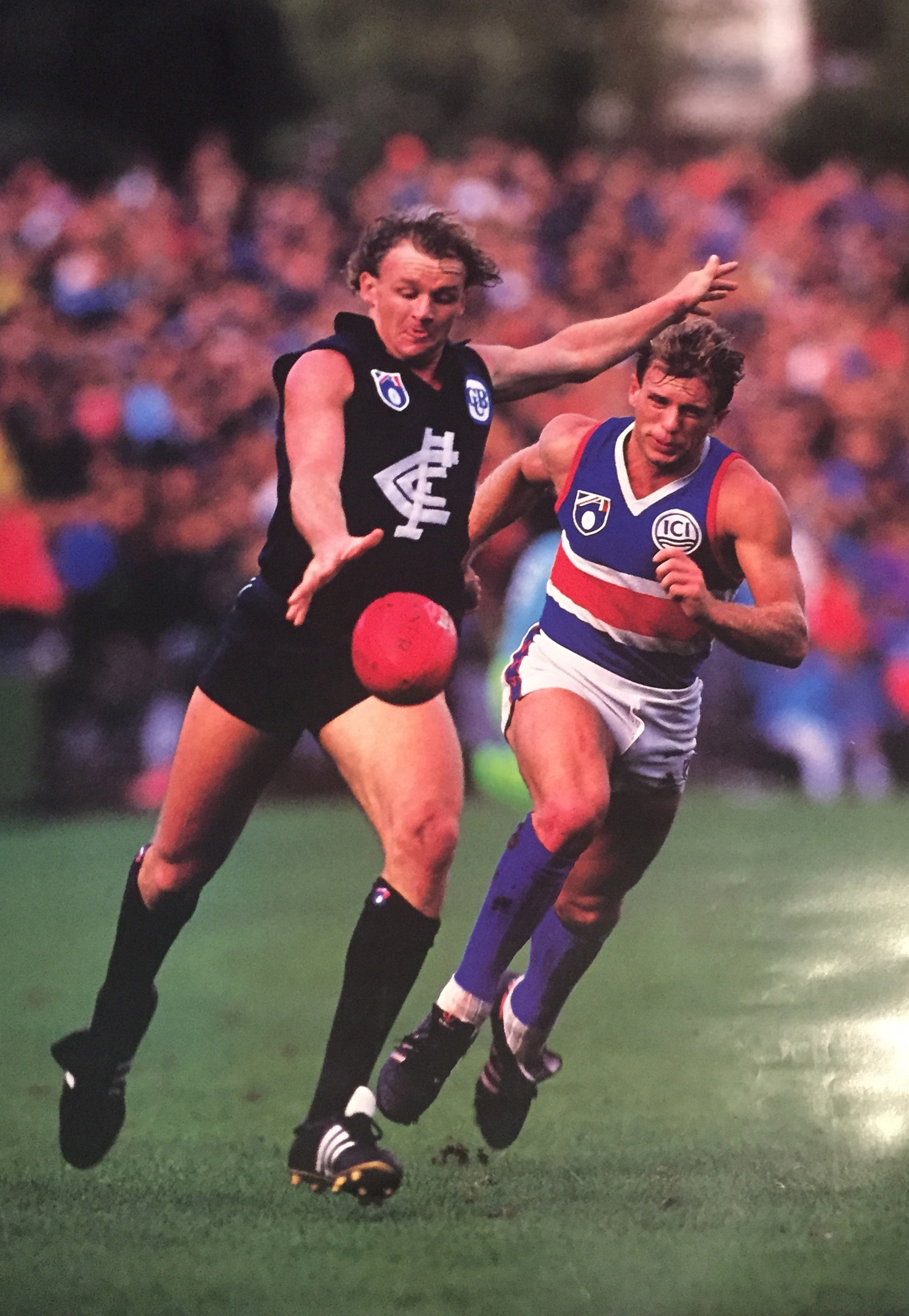
Footscray v Carlton

Troy Moloney (born 18 May 1966) is a former Australian rules footballer who played for Footscray Football Club in the Australian Football League (AFL). Moloney was recruited from East Keilor Football Club.

He made his senior debut in 1987 at the age of 20 after coming up through the ranks of the Under 19's and Reserves. Plagued by injury, Moloney would go on to play 36 senior games and kick 4 goals over six seasons at Footscray.
