= Gary Young (footballer) =

Australian rules footballer

Personal information
- Full name: Gary J. Young
- Born: 2 April 1958 (age 68)
- Original team: East Keilor
- Height: 185 cm (6 ft 1 in)
- Weight: 86 kg (190 lb)

Playing career^{1}
Years	Club	Games (Goals)
1977	Essendon	5 (1)
- ^{1} Playing statistics correct to the end of 1977.

Gary Young (born 2 April 1958) is a former Australian rules footballer who played with Essendon in the Victorian Football League (VFL). He was recruited from East Keilor in the Essendon District Football League and began playing for Essendon's under-19s in 1974.

== Sources ==
- Holmesby, Russell & Main, Jim (2009). The Encyclopedia of AFL Footballers. 8th ed. Melbourne: Bas Publishing.
- Gary Young's playing statistics from AFL Tables
- Essendon Football Club profile
