= Albion–Jacana railway line =

Railway line in Melbourne, Victoria, Australia

Albion–Jacana
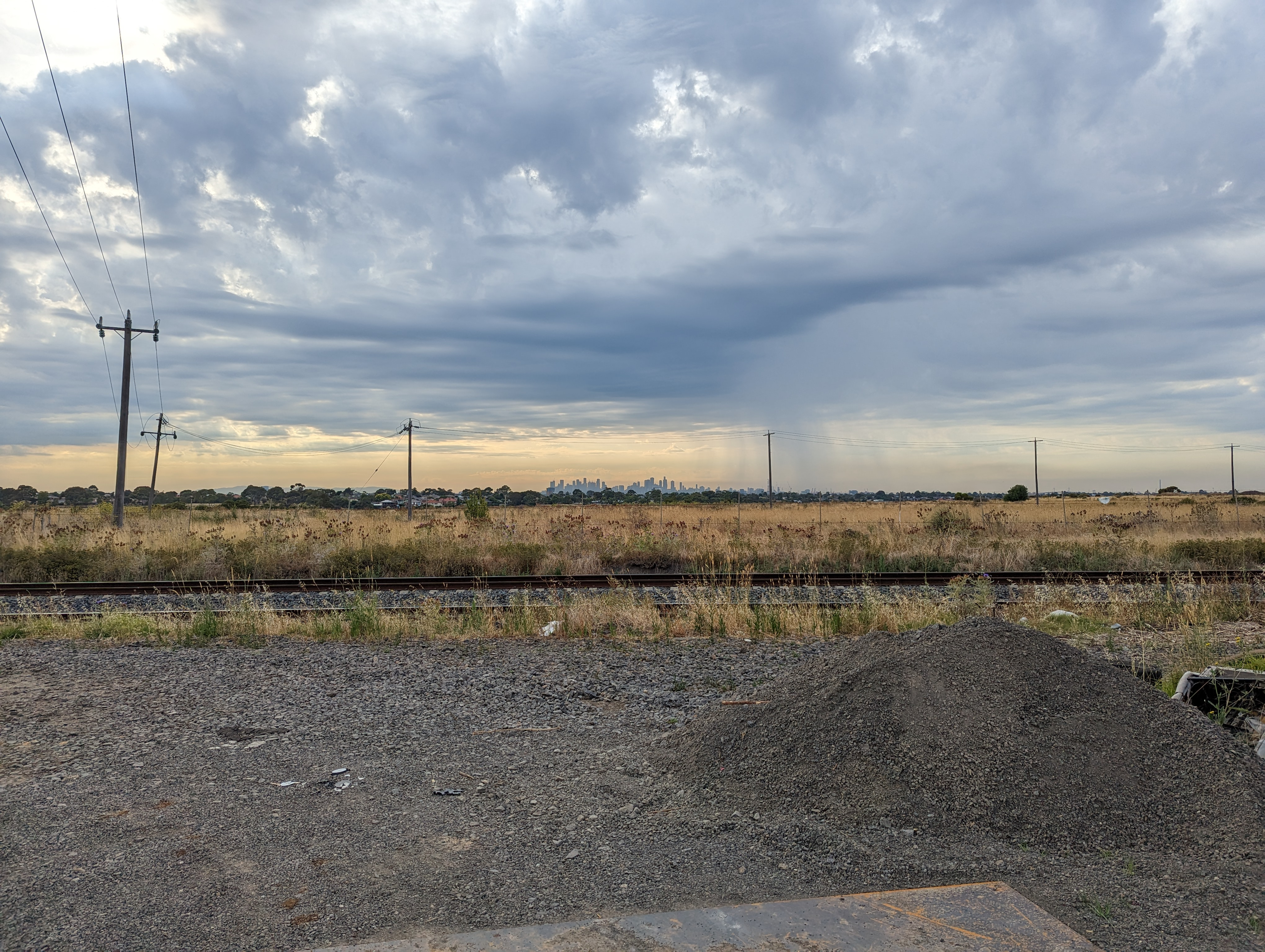
- Albion–Jacana line facing towards Melbourne CBD

Overview
- Stations: None

Service
- Type: Freight and limited passenger.
- System: Australian Rail Track Corporation

History
- Opened: 1929

Technical
- Number of tracks: Double track, broad and standard gauge

The Albion–Jacana line is a railway line in the western suburbs of Melbourne, Australia. Linking Albion on the Sunbury line to Jacana on the Craigieburn line, it is primarily used by freight trains and has no overhead wires, passenger stations or platforms.

== History ==
The line was opened on 1 July 1929 to allow freight trains to avoid the steeper grades and busy suburban traffic on the Broadmeadows line via Essendon. Initially consisting of two broad gauge tracks, in 1962 the track on the eastern side was converted to standard gauge as part of the Melbourne to Sydney gauge standardisation project.

== Melbourne Airport rail link ==
The Albion–Jacana railway line is a major section of the present preferred option for the proposed rail link to Melbourne Airport running via Sunshine station to the Melbourne central business district. The extra land required to build the link was confirmed as being reserved by the Victoria State Government in 2002.

In March 2013, the State Government confirmed that the Albion–Jacana corridor would be part of the proposed Melbourne Airport rail link.

== Description ==
Built as a double track railway, two major steel viaducts were required to cross the Maribyrnong River and Moonee Ponds Creek valleys. The Maribyrnong River Viaduct is 54.5 metres (178.8 ft) above the riverbed at its highest point and is the second tallest bridge in Victoria after the West Gate Bridge.

Today the track on the eastern side is standard gauge and part of the North East standard gauge line with two crossing loops. The parallel broad gauge also has two crossing loops, each located before rejoining the main lines.

V/Line Albury and NSW TrainLink XPT passenger services operate on the standard gauge line.

== Stations ==
Station histories
Station	Opened	Closed	Age	Notes
Albion	5 January 1860	1 January 1861	11 months	1st site; Was originally Albion and Darlington
Albion	24 March 1891	24 November 1919	28 years	1st site; Reopened as Albion
Albion	24 November 1919		106 years	2nd site
McIntyre Sidings	12 May 1964		62 years	Formerly Lysaght's Siding
Albistore Siding	3 February 1943	27 June 1972	29 years	Formerly Albstore Siding
Jacana	15 February 1959		67 years	
