= Australia Pacific Airports Corporation =

Australian airport management company

Australia Pacific Airports Corporation Limited
- Type: Private
- Industry: Airports
- Founded: 1995
- Headquarters: Melbourne Airport, Victoria, Australia
- Area served: Australia
- Key people: Christine O'Reilly, Chairman; Lorie Argus, CEO
- Revenue: ▲ A$1.04 billion (2018–19)
- Net income: ▲ A$ 390 million (2018–19)
- Divisions: Australia Pacific Airports (Melbourne) Pty Ltd; Australia Pacific Airports (Launceston) Pty Ltd
- Website: melbourneairport.com.au/corporate

Australia Pacific Airports Corporation Limited (APAC) is an unlisted company and owner of two Australian airports: Melbourne Airport and Launceston Airport. Each airport is operated by an airport lessee company, in which APAC has a controlling interest: Australia Pacific Airports (Melbourne) Pty Ltd and Australia Pacific Airports (Launceston) Pty Ltd respectively.

APAC acquired the lease for Melbourne Airport for $1.307 billion on 2 July 1997, and a 90% stake in Launceston Airport for $18.8 million on 29 May 1998. Launceston City Council owns the remaining 10% of Launceston Airport. Each airport is under a fifty year long-term lease from the Australian Government, with options for a further forty-nine years.

The company is majority Australian owned by five Australian fund managers:

- Dexus (27.32%)
- Industry Funds Management (IFM Investors) (25.17%)
- SAS Trustee Corporation (Managed by NSW Treasury Corporation)(18.47%)
- Future Fund (20.34%)
- Utilities of Australia (Managed by HRL Morrison & Co) (8.70%)

The chief executive officer is Lorie Argus.
