= List of environmental issues in Victoria =

This is a list of environmental issues that have resulted in environmental damage in Victoria, Australia.

== Air pollution ==
- 2019-2022: An excessive amount of dust, odours and other nuisible substances were emitted by Monsbent Pty Ltd, also known as D&R Henderson, in Benalla. The company was charged a fine of $80,000 in court in 2021 and taken to court again in 2022 for failing to comply with their authorised licence.

== Industrial fires ==
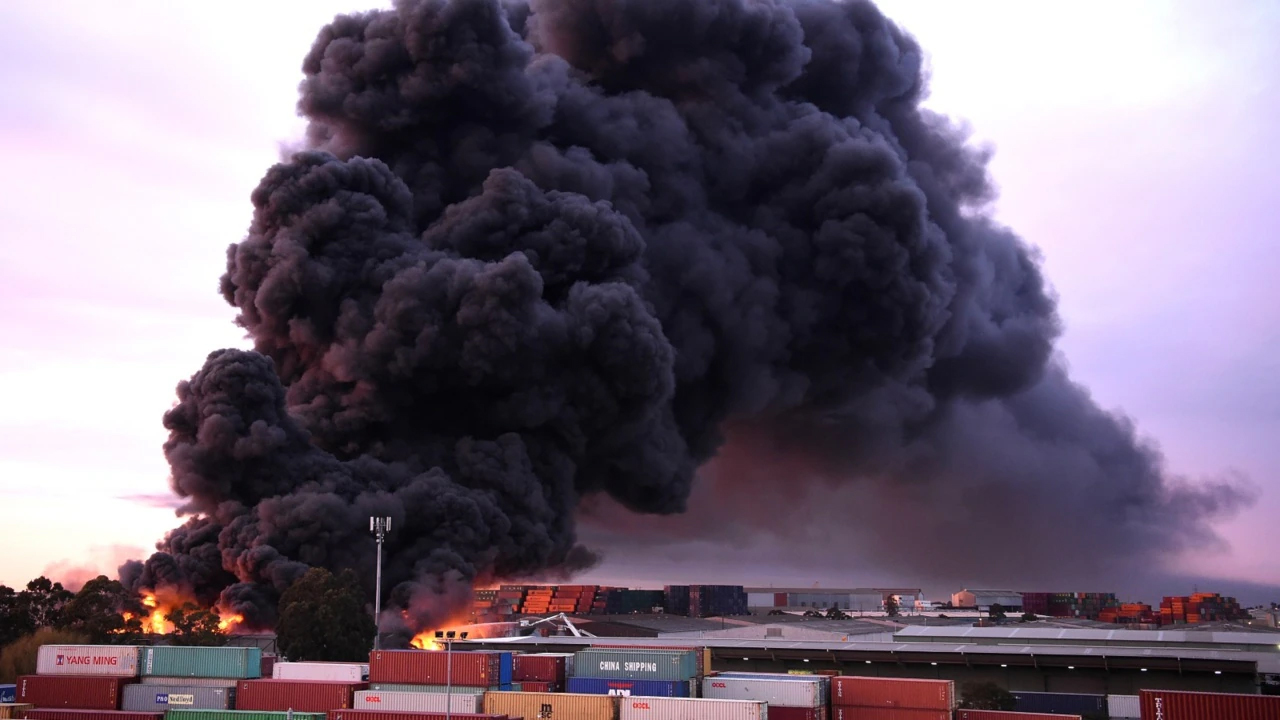
Dark smoke coming from the warehouse fire in West Footscray in August 2018

- 2017: A fire started in SKM recycling plants in Coolaroo emitting smoke and ashes impacting local neighbourhoods forcing some local residents to be evacuated. The company was ordered to pay a fine of $1.2 million.
- 2018: An industrial fire started in West Footscray in a warehouse storing chemicals illegally caused health issues to residents and killed local wildlife from Stony Creek and Yarra River.
- 2020: A toxic fire erupted at an e-waste recycling facility in Campbellfield causing loud explosions audible from kilometres away. Some of the contaminated water used to fight the fire spread out to Merlynston Creek and Jack Roper Reserve.
- 2021: In January two fires started in Laverton North. A large industrial fire started at a metal recycling facility and a second fire at a steel recycling facility.
- 2024: A fire lasted for two days in a stockpile of recycling materials in Laverton north.

== Odour pollution ==
- 2019: Kealba Sunshine Landfill emitted a strong smell for three years due to underground fires, Barro Group, the company got charged for several breaches of their general environmental duty.
- 2020: Visy paper mill in Reservoir released odorous steam due to its treatment process and several complaints were submitted by local communities which lead the company to be fined.
- 2021-2023: SBI Landfill in Cranbourne emitted continuous odour which impacted nearby residents. After more than 5,000 complaints, EPA Victoria took the company to court.
- 2022: Van Hessen sausage skin manufacturer in Wangaratta emitted a strong smell due to the wastewater treatment system, more than 160 reports were received and the company was found guilty in a court hearing.

== Soil pollution ==
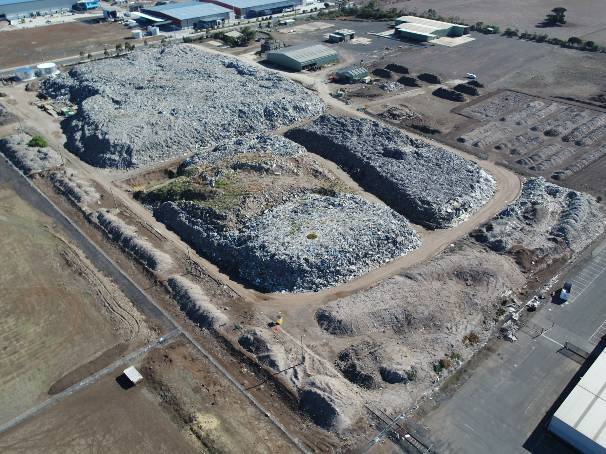
- Aerial view of the recycling facility on Broderick Road in Lara, Victoria
  2016: Lead shots coming from the Wangaratta Clay Target Shooting Club were found in the North Wangaratta Recreation Reserve which caused the lead levels to be above health conditions. The club closed for six months to remove the contaminated soil.
- 2018: 32 sites containing illegal medical and toxic waste were found within the 1400 acre property of Lemon Springs in Kaniva. The owner of the land partnered with a company to offer cheap alternatives for toxic waste. EPA Victoria removed more than 1,650 tonnes of liquid waste and 13,500 tonnes of contaminated soil.
- 2019: A recycling facility on Broderick road in Lara stockpiled around 300,000 tonnes of construction waste, including asbestos, which created a high risk of fire. EPA Victoria finished the three years long clean-up in 2022 after the company went into liquidation.

== Tyre stockpiles ==
- 2017: Approximately one million tyres that weighed about 9500 tonnes were removed in over 380 truck loads from a site in Stawell that posed a fire risk. The removal was completed in nine weeks. The removal cost EPA Victoria A$4.5 million.
- 2019: Approximately half a million tyres that weighed 5000 tonnes were removed over 10 weeks from a site in Numurkah that posed a fire risk. The removal cost EPA Victoria A$2 million.

== Water pollution ==
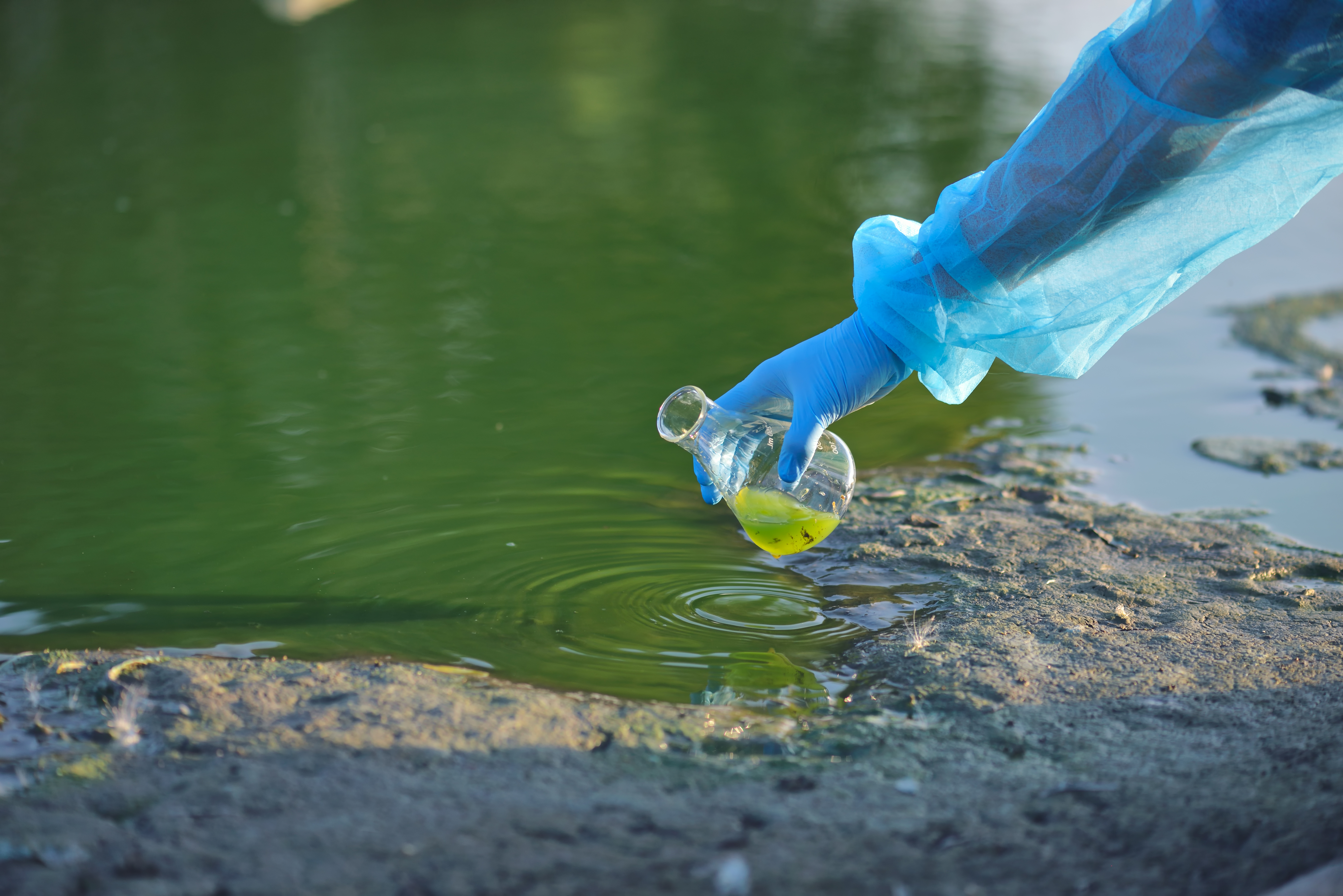
- EPA Victoria researcher in the process of taking a sample of contaminated water from a lake
  2018: PFAS chemicals were found in groundwater at Esso's Longford plant impacting local agriculture and livestock operations. The chemicals, known to be linked to cancer in people and animals, impacted the operations of livestock operations.
- 2018: Fatty and smelly liquid were found in the Yuroke Creek, in Broadmeadows, due to a leak coming from a local dairy manufacturing company. The leak caused damage to the wildlife and vegetation.
- 2021: Foster Creek in Korumburra received wastewater from South Gippsland Water's treatment plant due to an excess in its processing capacity.
- 2022: 13,000 litres of detergent were spilled in Cherry Lake after an industrial fire happened in Laverton North and killed 20 tonnes of fish.
- 2022: Sediments were reported running through the Yarrowee river impacting flora and fauna.
- 2022: East Gippsland Water got fined twice for discharging million litres of wastewater into Macleod Morass and failing to comply with their regulatory notice to EPA Victoria.
- 2023: Concrete gravel escaped through stormwater drains in Laverton North and caused risk to local waterways and Cherry lake.

== See also ==
- Contemporary Australian environmental incidents
- Environmental issues in Australia
- Environmental issues in Melbourne
- Environment of Australia
- List of environmental accidents in the fossil fuel industry in Australia
- Odour pollution in Australia
