= 2018 West Footscray warehouse fire =

2018 industrial fire in Melbourne, Victoria, Australia

Coordinates: 37.8093°S 144.8562°E

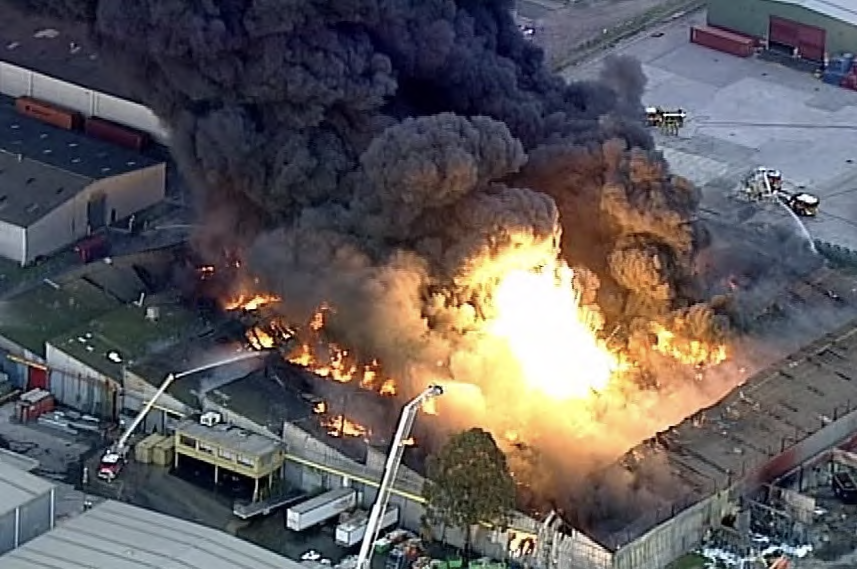
Warehouse fire in West Footscray in 2018

The 2018 West Footscray warehouse fire was a major industrial fire that occurred in the border of West Footscray and Tottenham, an inner-western suburb of Melbourne, Victoria, Australia, beginning on 30 August 2018. The fire took the Metropolitan Fire Brigade several days to fully control and emitted a large plume of toxic black smoke, visible across Melbourne.

== Background ==
The warehouse where the fire occurred is owned by Danbol Pty Ltd; the sole director and shareholder of which is Christopher James Baldwin, an accountant based in Shepparton, who had been recently raided by ATO for illegal company phoenixing activity. Operating as Bradbury Industrial Services, the warehouse was leased by Graeme Leslie White, who had prior firearms offences, and had other business arrangements with Baldwin. Danbol Pty Ltd brought a lawsuit against Maribyrnong City Council and BOC gas in 2024 for negligence in failing to stop the stockpiling of chemicals on his property.

== Fire ==
Emergency services were first called to the factory at 420 Somerville Road, West Footscray around 5am on 30 August 2018, arriving six minutes after the first call. The 100-by-200-metre (330 ft × 660 ft) warehouse was fully alight. 80 firefighters and 20 fire-fighting appliances initially responded, with the number of firefighters eventually rising to more than 140. Firefighters' ability to reach the centre of the fire was hampered by walls of shipping containers and 44 gallon drums stacked up within the warehouse. A week after the fire started, hotspots remained.

== Investigations ==
Initial investigations in the aftermath of the fire indicated the cause was suspicious. Detectives from the Victoria Police Arson and Explosive Squad assumed responsibility for the investigation into the exact cause of the fire.

WorkSafe Victoria announced after the fire that the warehouse was not registered to store dangerous chemicals. As a result of community concern, Worksafe inspected other industrial properties within the area, and "found dozens ... that also failed to comply with the [Dangerous Goods] act". Environment Protection Authority Victoria also investigated links between the owner of the site, the lessee, and other properties in the north of Melbourne, where industrial chemicals were found to be stored illegally at Lemon Springs in Kaniva.

At the request of the firefighters' union and Metropolitan Fire Brigade, a coronial investigation was opened into the incident.

== Health effects ==
In the hours after the fire began, authorities issued a "community advice warning" for Brooklyn, Kingsville, Tottenham, West Footscray, Altona North, Braybrook, Footscray, South Kingsville, Spotswood, Sunshine, and Yarraville, with residents being warned to close windows and doors. Residents were still reporting health issues three weeks after the fire. Firefighters were also concerned about the longterm effects of exposure to toxic chemicals.

== Environmental effects ==
Within hours of the fire, dead fish, eels, birds and other wildlife were washing up dead on the banks of Stony Creek. The Environment Protection Authority (EPA) warned people not to eat fish from Stony Creek or the lower Yarra River, and not to enter, put their hands into or allow dogs into the creek. As of March 2019, EPA Victoria continues to monitor the water and sediment of Stony Creek for pollutants including phenol, BTEX, PFAS, acetone and butanone.

== Gallery ==
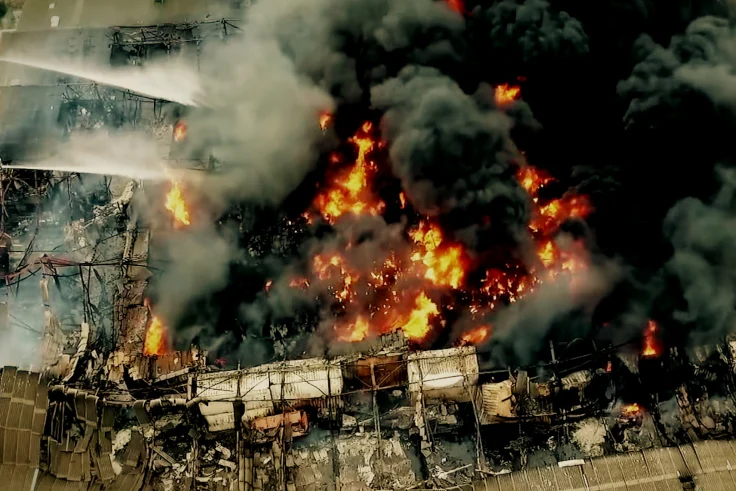
Aerial view of the extent of the industrial fire in West Footscray in 2018

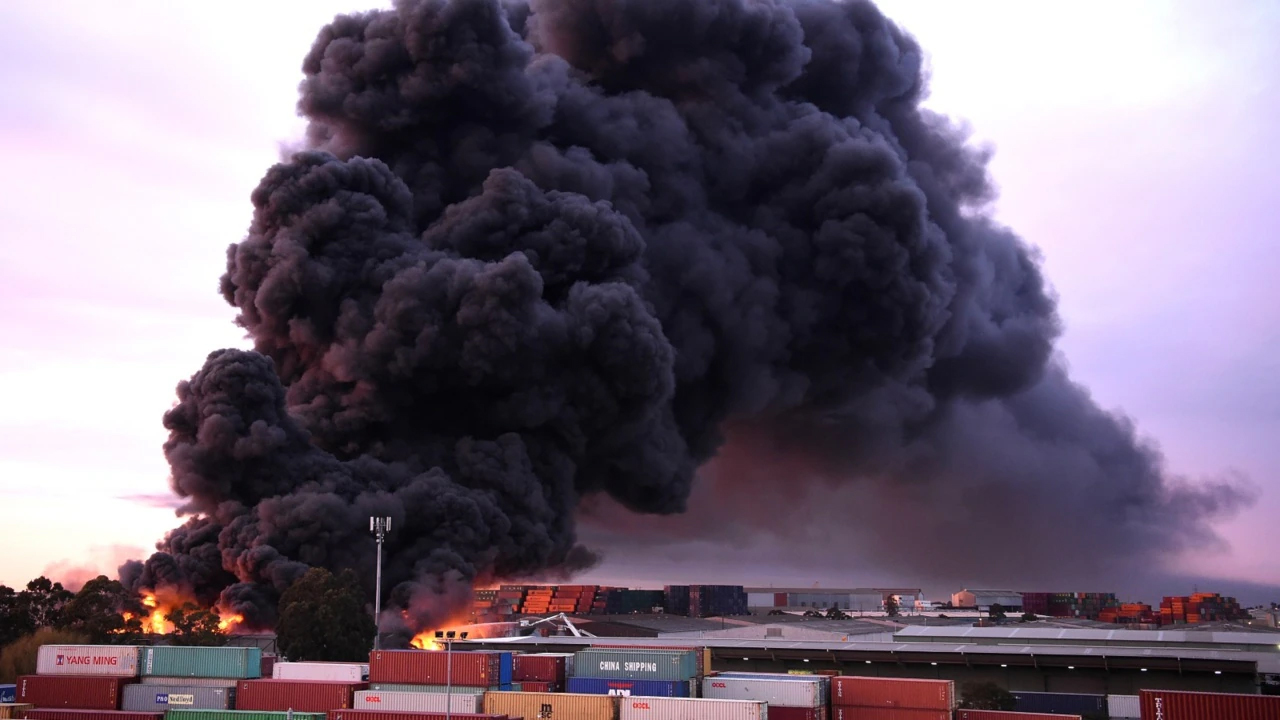
View of the chemical smoke coming from the warehouse fire

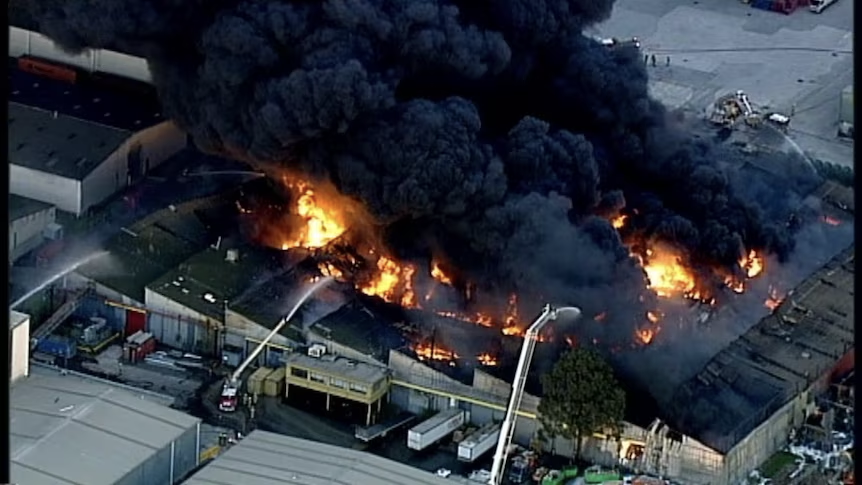
Aerial view of the firefighters trying to stop the fire in West Footscray

== See also ==
- List of environmental issues in Victoria
- Environmental issues in Melbourne
