= Lemon Springs (Victoria) =

Australian reserve and illegal toxic waste dump

Lemon Springs Bushland Reserve
- IUCN category IV (habitat/species management area)
- Location within Victoria Location within Australia
- Location: Victoria, Australia
- Nearest city: Kaniva, Victoria
- Coordinates: 36.6460240°S 141.3125021°E
- Established: 1992
- Governing body: Environment Protection Authority

Lemon Springs or Lemon Springs Bushland Reserve is a 1400-acre property situated 15 km south of Kaniva, Victoria, Australia, in the municipality of West Wimmera Shire Council. It was the site of the biggest toxic dumpsite found in Australia.

== History and environment ==
Lemon Springs' native name is Gnalp, which means "Spring" and the site was originally part of a larger property on the Glenelg river, with Pleasant Banks and Montana until the 19th century.

In 1865, Lemon Springs was described as:

A spring of fine fresh water about 16 miles N.N.E of Apsley, in the sandy plains in that district. Miocene underlying tertiary beds of sand and shale.

Wildlife at Lemon Springs is rich and includes endangered cockatoos, echidnas, black wallabies and emus.

== Toxic Waste Dumping ==
=== Beginning ===
In August 2012, Graham Leslie White bought the 567-hectare property stating he would use it as a quad biking course for his family.

White partnered with Bradbury Industrial Services after 2013, a waste recycling and remediation company, to offer a cheaper alternative for toxic waste producers and owners.

While eight other places were found to stock waste in Tottenham, Epping and Campbellfield, the Lemon Springs property became the main destination for most of the toxic waste operated by the illegal partnership between White and Bradbury. Their operations were so important that they distorted the toxic waste disposal national market.

In 2016 and 2017, Victoria Police reported White to EPA Victoria for his illegal chemical operations.

In 2018, one of White's properties in West Footscray exploded and became a major industrial fire.

=== Amount of waste ===
Through thorough investigation using drones with ground penetrating radar, EPA Victoria discovered 32 sites where containers were buried as well as other smaller dump locations over the 1400 acre property.

- Site 1: Seven trenches were found, each contained buried medical waste, including needles, and contaminated the soil with PFAS.
- Site 3: Explosive airbag detonators were found in steel drums and chemicals leaking on the ground stained the soil.
- Site 8: Agricultural pesticide found in cylinders and drums full of acids and colourful caustics substances.
- Site 19: A four metre deep pit full of medical waste found in 100 tonnes chemical drums. The soil was sent to special landfill as it was highly contaminated.
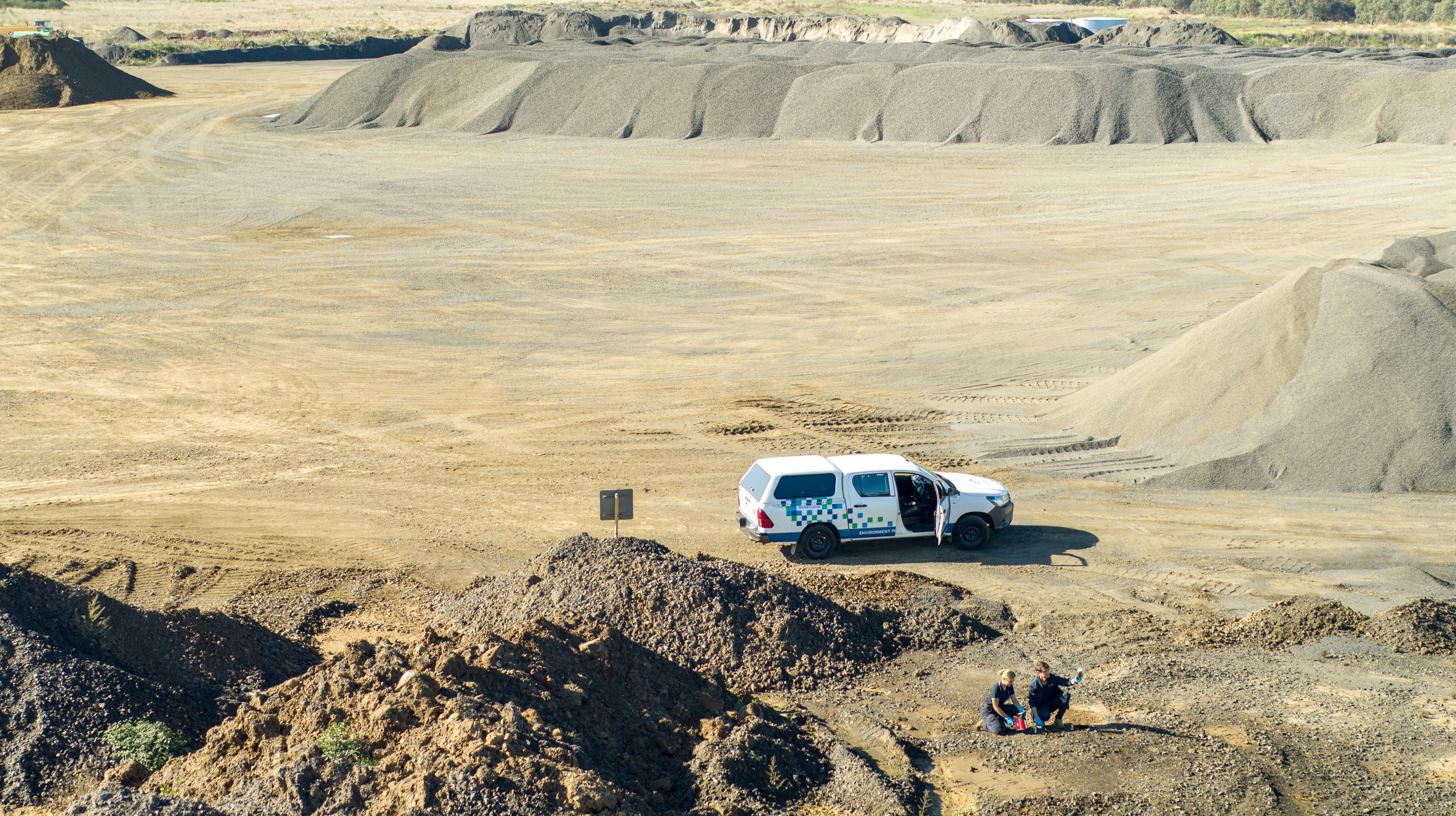
  EPA Victoria staff and car at Lemon Springs
- Site 23: Largest dumpsite of the property which contained as much as 32 semi-trailer truckloads of waste, a stockpile of asbestos and up to 15,700 acetylene gas cylinders.
- Site 24: A six metres deep pit was discovered under a pile of sand. Acetylene cylinders and liquid waste were found and caught fire due to chemical reactions.
- Site 32: Shipping containers and a caravan were found on top of a trench full of acetylene cylinders and chemical waste.

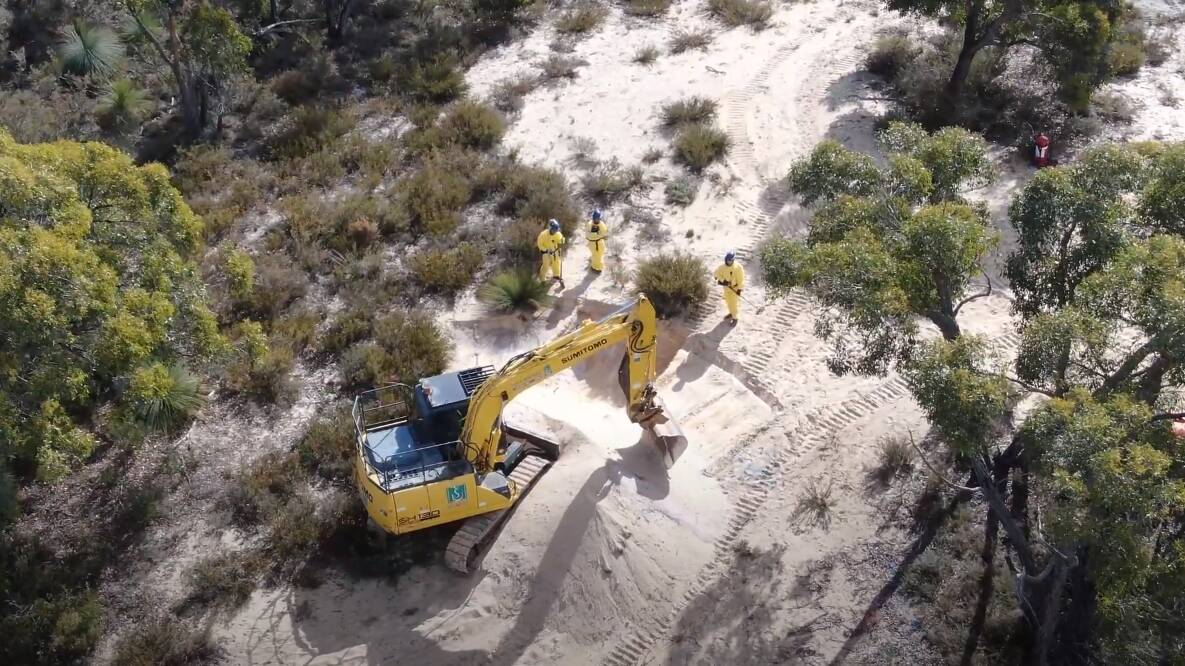
Clean up of the toxic landfill in Lemon Springs by EPA staff

EPA Victoria removed the waste from the 32 sites and re-filled 25 of them with clean soil making it the largest project of this kind in Australia. More than 1,650 tonnes of liquid waste and 13,500 tonnes of contaminated soil were removed.

=== Enforcement and legal action ===
In December 2019, EPA Victoria took over the management of the site according to its powers given by the Environment Protection Act of 1970 and started the clean up of all sites. This clean up had a budget of 20 million dollars and the recovery cleaning cost will be pursued to be paid by the property owner.

White is facing three charges of dumping industrial waste before the Supreme Court as well as intentional causing of environmental hazards at the Lemon Springs property and an additional 39 charges for the other properties across Melbourne.

== Aftermath ==
The discovery and digging up of 51,500 gas cylinders made for storing acetylene stored in the property raised the question of recycling such tanks and led to the creation of a recycling program dedicated to these cylinders. Enviropacific, a service company received a license by EPA Victoria to create a facility in Stawell which would store, clean and reuse parts of the cylinders.

EPA Victoria has been considering selling the land to a local conservation group.

== See also ==
- Environmental issues in Australia
- List of environmental issues in Victoria
