= Odour pollution in Australia =

Smell pollution regulated by law

Odour pollution in Australia is a type of pollution regulated by law and arises mainly in industrial areas.

== Definition ==
Odours come from different mixtures of gases in the air that are detectable by smell. Industries and human activities are responsible for most odours.

Odours may come from:

- Agriculture and composting
- Animal farms, meat works and rendering plants
- Chemical industries
- Food processing plants
- Landfills and waste treatment

Some factors may help determine the level of interference experienced by people such as:

- Frequency of odour
- Intensity
- Duration of exposure
- Offensiveness of the odour
- Location
- Impact on normal activities

== Victoria ==
=== Odour control ===
Odour is a form of pollution recognised in Victorian Law in the Environment Protection Act 2017, therefore, the risk of harm by being in contact with it should be minimised and businesses need to make sure that their activities don't impact local residents. Businesses may have to apply for a licence or permit to be able to carry out their activities.

Local councils are in charge of receiving complaints for small businesses and neighbours and EPA Victoria handles odour complaints about large facilities and industries.

EPA also gives advice, and creates guidelines for businesses and works with governments and councils to include odour in future plans and decisions.

In 2021, Brimbank was recognised as Melbourne's smelliest suburb with more than 640 complaints from residents mainly due to the large amount of industries in the area.

=== Odour pollution cases ===
==== Kealba Sunshine landfill ====
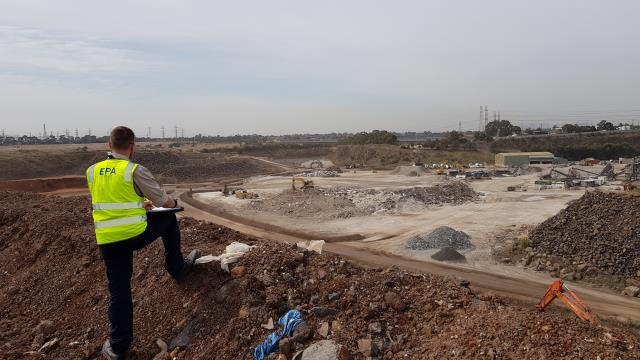
EPA staff overseeing the Sunshine landfill in Kealba

Kealba is a north-western suburb of Melbourne where the Sunshine Landfill, operated by Barro Group, had four underground fires burning for three years starting in 2019 which produced a smell described as "rotting carcasses" and was the result of oxygen being in contact with decomposed waste.

EPA charged Barro Group and its three directors with several breaches of their General Environmental Duty which implies the need for polluters to take reasonable steps to minimise the risks to human health and the environment from their pollution.

The penalty faced in 2022 was up to $1.8 million for the company and $360,000 for each individual director.

Both EPA Victoria and Barro Group monitored the air quality and concluded that the long-term risk to health from the smell was low.

Early 2023, the licence to operate the landfill, which was suspended in 2021, got cancelled by EPA and the remaining fire kept burning.

==== Sausage skin manufacturer Van Hessen in Wangaratta ====
Van Hessen Australia is an Australian sausage skin manufacturer whose factory is situated in Wangaratta and impacted local communities with a strong smell. More than 160 reports were received in 2 months by EPA Victoria at the end of 2022.

The smell was due to Van Hessen's private wastewater treatment system which included desludging activities and upset conditions in the wastewater treatment pond.

The company received more than ten notices from EPA to prevent activities increasing the smell, improving processes and maintaining stable conditions on site despite being under a licence from EPA and being under the obligation to ensure that the release of offensive odours must be done within the licence boundaries.

In December 2023, a court hearing found Van Hessen guilty and was ordered to provide $75,000 to an environmental improvement project in South Wangaratta.

==== Visy Paper recycling plant in Reservoir ====
The paper mill situated in Reservoir in the north of Melbourne, is one of the eight paper mills across Australia and is run by Visy, a recycled and kraft paper manufacturer. Multiple complaints from local residents were received by EPA from 2020.

Odorous steam is released from chimneys due to the treatment process happening in the mill, the smell may vary from vinegar to grease trap.

EPA submitted four remedial notices since 2020 and fined the company $9,000 for failing to stop the smell a year later. Mid 2023, odour emissions were still monitored by EPA around the Visy site.

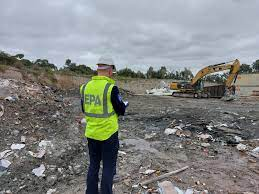
EPA staff monitoring odour pollution at SBI landfill

==== SBI landfill in Cranbourne ====
Stevensons Brothers Industries (SBI) Landfill in Cranbourne emitted continuous odour which impacted nearby residents. The smell was described as 'rotten eggs'.

After receiving more than 5,000 complaints between mid 2021 to mid 2023, EPA Victoria took Stevensons Brothers Industries (SBI) Landfill to court claiming that the company failed to fulfil their general environmental duty due to the landfill's continued odour impact on nearby communities.

The company faced a fine up to $1.8 million and $360,000 for each director.

== South Australia ==
The Environment Protection Authority South Australia gives licences to companies and require them to take reasonable steps to avoid and minimise the odour emitted within their premises. The local councils are in charge of dealing with other odour issues under the Local Nuisance and Litter Control Act 2016.

== Tasmania ==
Similarly to other Australian EPAs, Environment Protection Authority Tasmania is competent to deal with complaints for larger emitters while smaller business are regulated by local councils.

== Western Australia ==
Odours are included in the Environmental Protection Act 1986. The Department of Water and Environmental Regulation is in charge of regulating large businesses that are licensed or registered under the EP Act.

== See also ==
- Environmental issues in Australia
- Environment of Australia
