= Cherry Lake (Victoria) =

Lake in Victoria, Australia

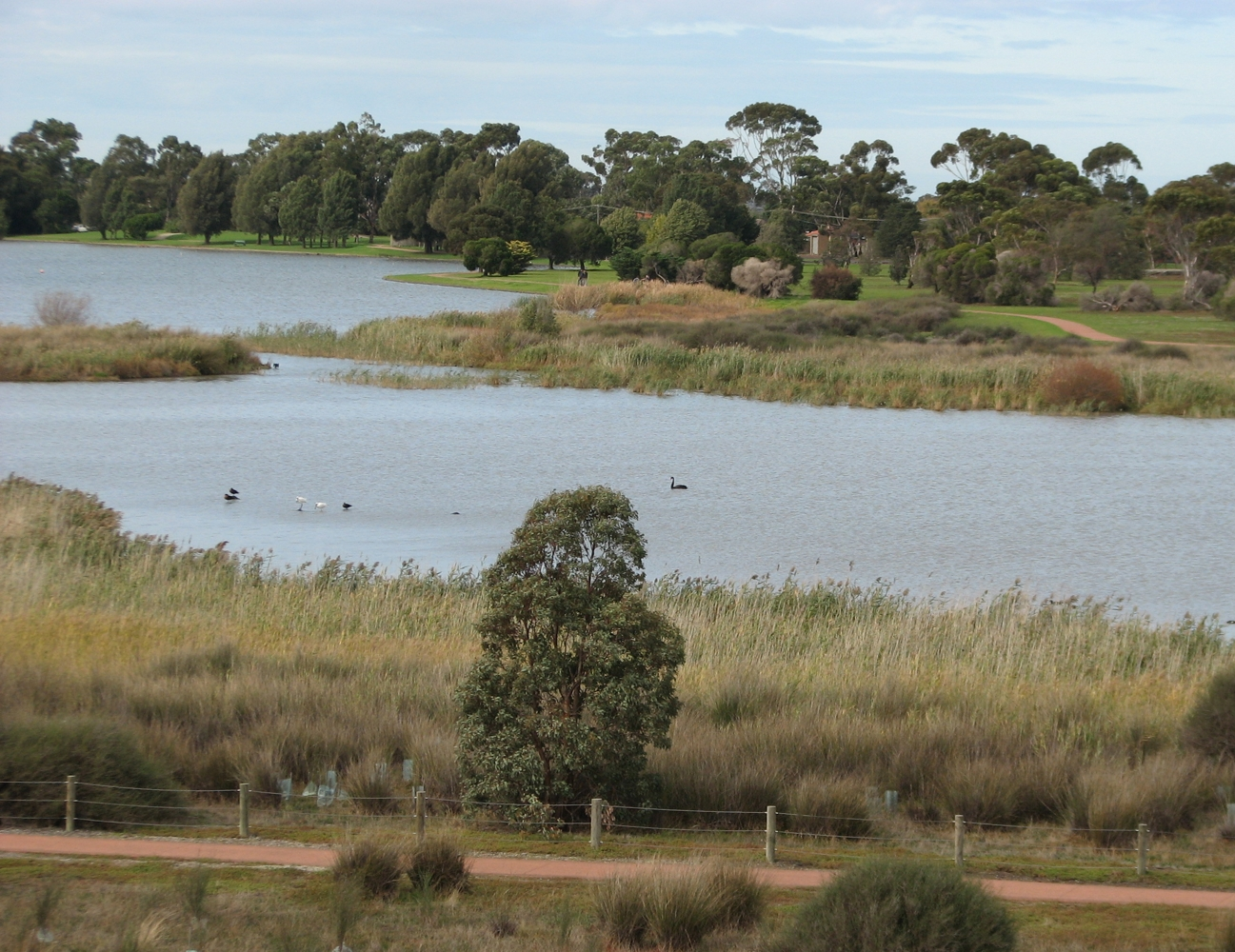

- Location within Victoria
- Location: City of Hobsons Bay, Victoria
- Coordinates: 37°51′30″S 144°50′5″E
- Type: Storm water drain
- Basin countries: Australia
- Average depth: 1 m (3.3 ft)

Cherry Lake is part of historical coastal wetlands in Altona, a suburb of Melbourne, Victoria, Australia. The wetlands were converted to a lake with construction of retaining walls, levees and flow channels. The lake and surrounding reserve is an important wildlife habitat and popular recreational destination.

== Flora and fauna ==
Cherry Lake and nearby Truganina Swamp are habitat for the native sedge, chaffy sawsedge (Gahnia filum). The sedge fields provide food and habitat for the endangered Altona skipper butterfly (Hesperilla flavescens flavescens).

The lake and associated salt marsh vegetation provides habitat for pelicans, black swans and purple swamphens.

Weed control is carried out on a regular basis, targeting spiny rush, serrated tussock and boxthorn.

Mosquito larvae numbers are monitored and a biological agent is occasionally utilised for control. Rabbit control is also undertaken.

The first fish were introduced in Cherry Lake in 1972.

== Construction ==
The lake was created in the 1960s as a flood retention basin for residential expansion in Altona and Brooklyn. Prior to this, it was a motor racing circuit, constructed in 1954 at a cost of 35,000 pounds.

Levees were constructed on the south and east side of the lake with a spillway and channel which discharges excess water to Port Phillip Bay. These help to maintain a relatively constant water level of around one metre in depth. An additional higher levee bank was constructed to prevent floodwaters from Kororoit Creek sweeping across the lake toward residential areas.

== Recreational and community use ==
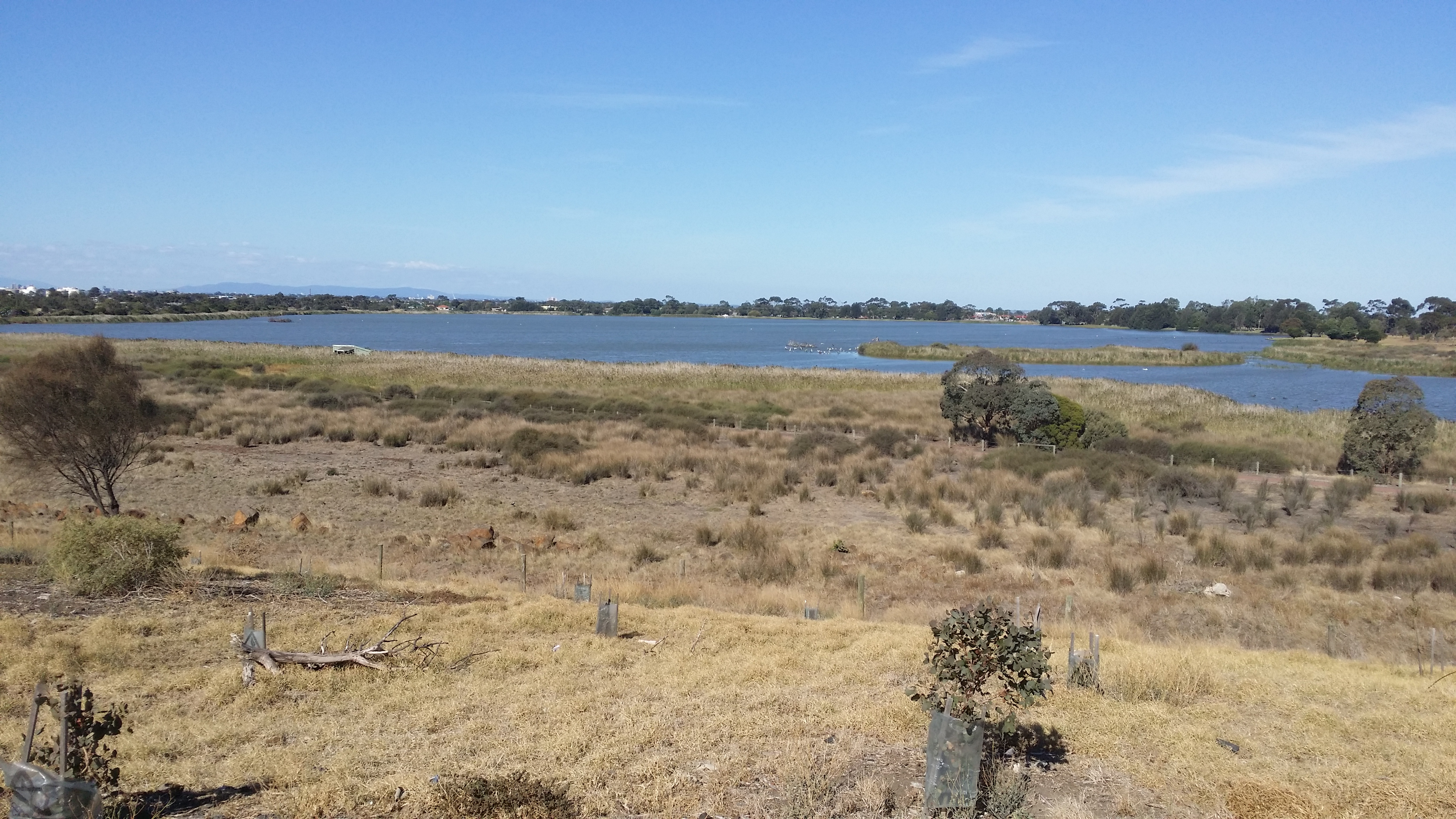
A view of almost the whole of Cherry Lake in Altona, Victoria, Australia, looking towards Melbourne

The lake attracts boats, windsurfers and anglers. Water birds can be viewed from a bird hide.

A 3.7-kilometre-long shared walking and bicycle path encircles the lake, connected to the Hobsons Bay Coastal Trail. Other facilities in the reserve include a playground, picnic shelter, barbecue, seating, toilets and car park which is accessed from Millers Road. The Altona Lions Club hold an outdoor market on the first Sunday of every month (and the third Sunday in December) on the Millers Road side of the park.

== Motor racing ==
Originally just a swamp, the Victorian Sporting Car Club built a 2.3-mile circuit in 1953–54. This circuit was known as the Altona Circuit. Unfortunately for the club, the swamp soon became a lake, with the circuit being completely covered by water during winter in 1955. It was used just once more in 1956 before closing for good.

After the closure of the Albert Park Circuit in 1958, it was proposed that a new circuit and facilities be built on the Cherry Lake site for the 1964 Australian Grand Prix, to be called Altona Park, but ultimately the facility was built in Sandown instead.

== Environmental issues ==
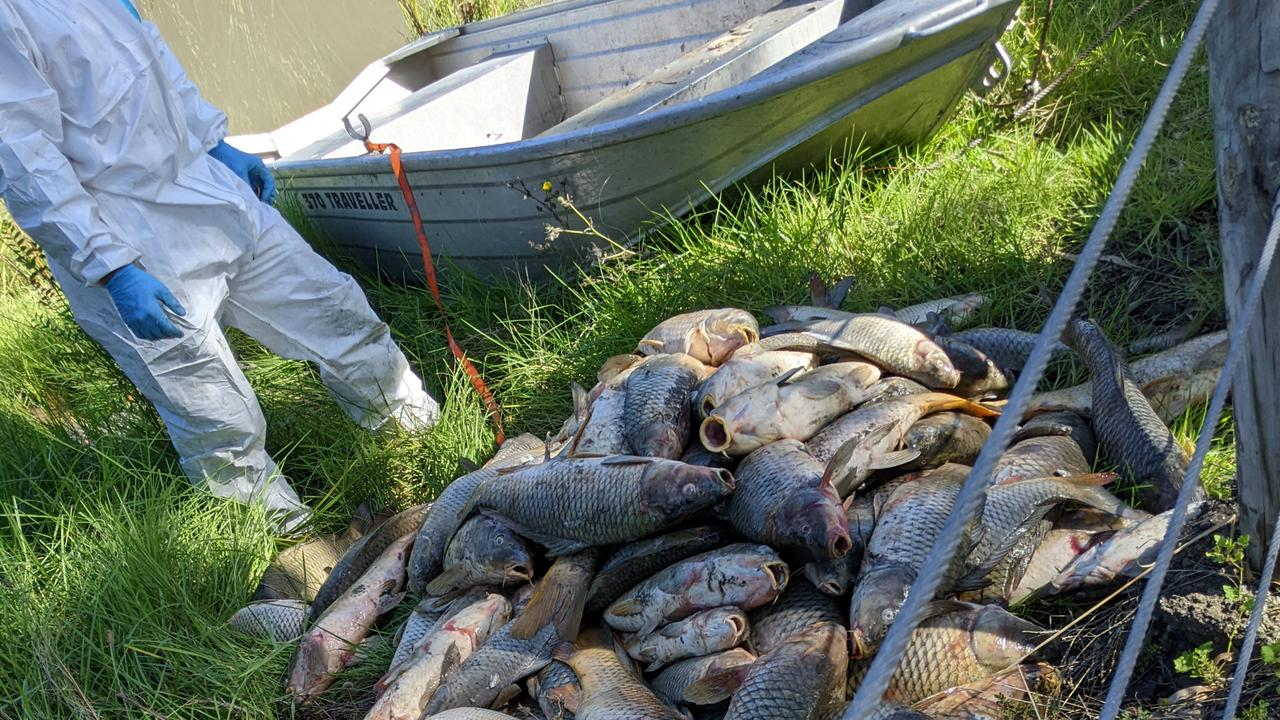
Dead fish found in Cherry Lake after the detergent spill in 2022

=== Detergent spill ===
On the 7th of March 2022, a spill of up to 13,000 litres of detergent, Teric N9, was reported to EPA Victoria after a factory fire from Laverton North industrial area. Melbourne Water found 20 tonnes of dead fish in the lake and cleaned up about 38 million litres of contaminated water which were sent to sewer.

MTAW Group Pty Ltd, a transport and warehousing company, got charged by EPA in October 2022 for not minimising the risk of harm of the spill and failing to comply with its general environmental duty. The estimated total fines was up to $1.8 million.

Early 2023, the water quality was considered acceptable and it was confirmed that the fish population was still present and would return to pre-spill levels within a few seasons.

=== Concrete gravel and dust in drains ===
At the end of 2023, Aerolink Property Construction Pty Ltd, a company situated in Laverton North, got fined $1,923 by EPA Victoria for letting dust and concrete gravel escape through kerb side gutters and stormwater drains causing risk to nearby waterways including Cherry Creek.

== Gallery ==
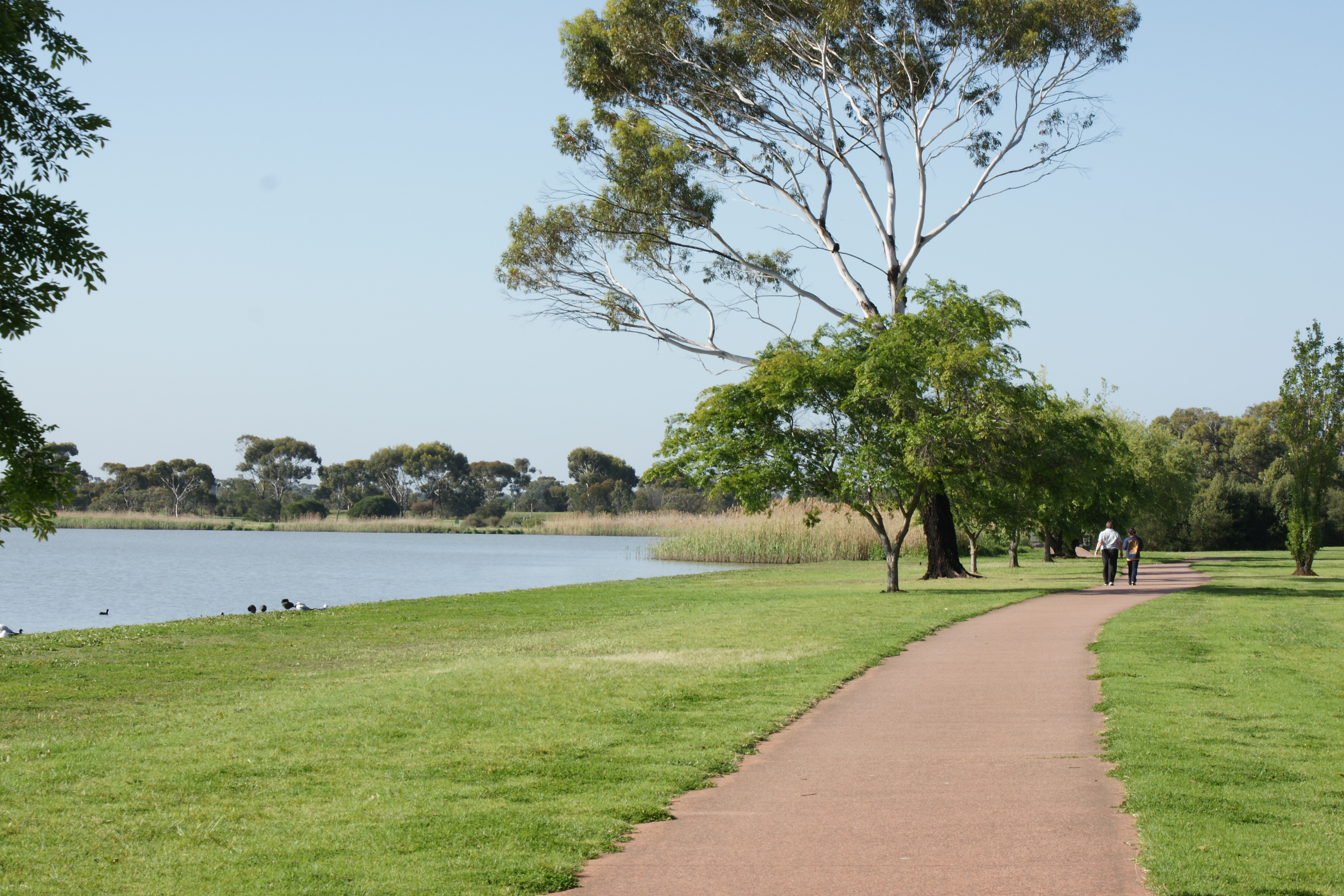
Footpath next to Cherry Lake

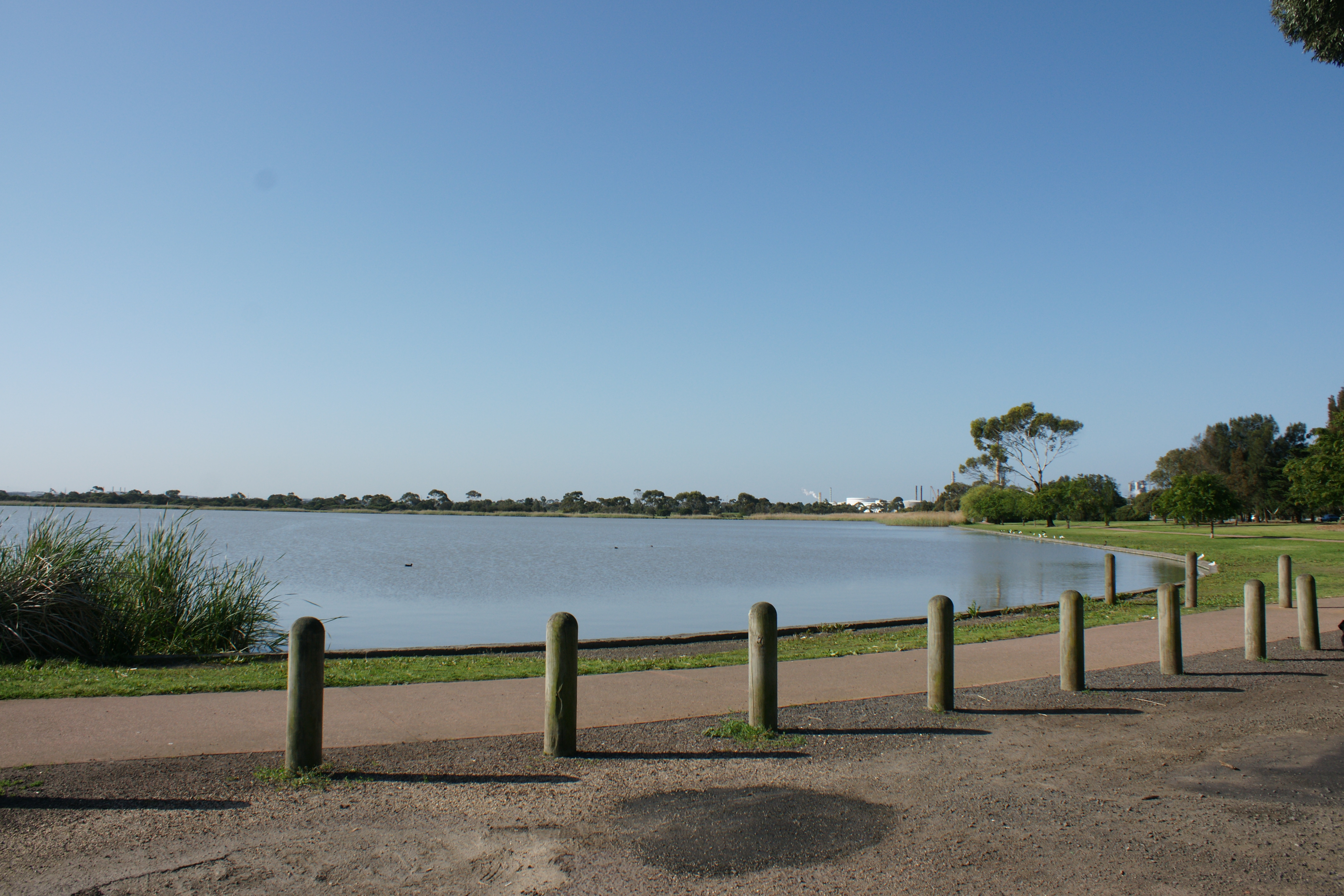
Footpath and view over Cherry Lake

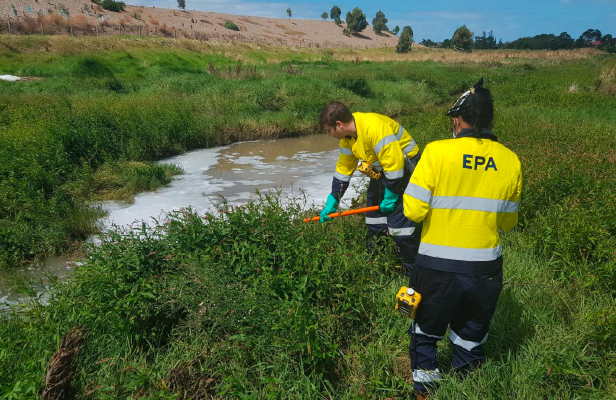
EPA staff cleaning Cherry Lake after the detergent spill in 2022
