= Kinninvie =

Coordinates: 54°35′30″N 1°55′24″W

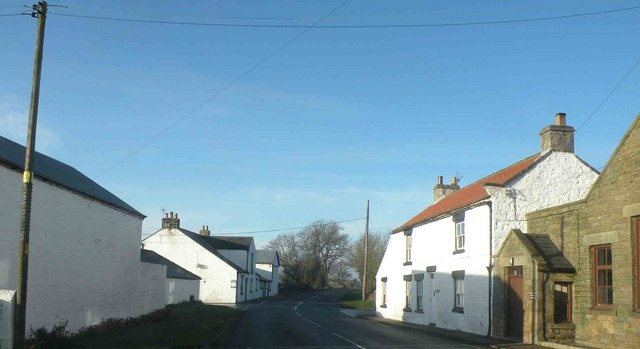

- Location within County Durham
- Civil parish: Marwood
- Unitary authority: County Durham
- Ceremonial county: Durham
- Region: North East
- Country: England
- Sovereign state: United Kingdom
- Police: Durham
- Fire: County Durham and Darlington
- Ambulance: North East

Kinninvie is a hamlet in the civil parish of Marwood, in County Durham, England. It is situated to the north of Barnard Castle.

The name Kinninvie is of Goidelic origin and is thought to mean "white headland".
