= Kaniva =

- Town
- Coordinates: 36°22′0″S 141°14′0″E
- Country: Australia
- State: Victoria
- LGA: Shire of West Wimmera
- Location: 413 km (257 mi) NW of Melbourne; 313 km (194 mi) SE of Adelaide; 113 km (70 mi) NW of Horsham; 41 km (25 mi) from Nhill

Government
  - State electorate: Lowan
  - Federal division: Mallee

Population
  - Total: 803 (2016 census)
- Postcode: 3419

Kaniva is a town in Victoria, Australia. It is located on the Western Highway, north of Little Desert National Park, in the Shire of West Wimmera local government area. It is located roughly 25 kilometres (16 mi) east of the South Australian border and 43 kilometres (27 mi) east of Bordertown. At the 2016 census, Kaniva had a population of 803. The town is commonly used as a rest point for those travelling between Melbourne and Adelaide. The Kaniva region has some rare flora and fauna. The rare south-eastern red-tailed black cockatoo is found in the region. The Shire of West Wimmera prohibits the felling of dead trees to ensure that they have adequate nesting sites.

== Economy ==
Kaniva's economy is heavily based on agriculture. According to the 2006 Census 31 percent of employed people are engaged in the sheep, cattle and grain farming industry. The wool industry is celebrated with Kaniva's 'sheep art'; statues along the main street painted by local community groups.

When the local fuel station was threatened with closure the local community decided that they couldn't afford to lose it. The nearest fuel station, located in Nhill, is an 80 kilometres (50 mi) round trip. In 2004 the Kaniva Community Co-operative was formed and a decision was made to raise the money, over A$400 000 to buy the business. The Kaniva Community Roadhouse, colloquially known as "Wimpy", is today a valued community asset.

== History ==
Squatter Heighway Jones of South Australia colonised the country around Kaniva in 1845. He claims to have had sheep grazing here by 1846 and the Tattyara run was gazetted in 1851. The homestead was only a few kilometres from the present townsite. Tattyara was named after the Tyatyalla Aborigines who inhabited the district. The post office opened on 1 December 1881 as Budjik and was renamed Kaniva in 1882. The origin of the name are uncertain. It may derive from Kinninvie in Durham, England, or from Cniva, a 3rd-century Gothic chieftain who began the invasion of the Roman Empire, or from an Aboriginal word. Kaniva Railway Station was constructed by Cashin & Turner, to the design of the Victorian Railways Department Architecture Branch, on the Dimboola-Serviceton line in 1887.

== Traditional ownership ==
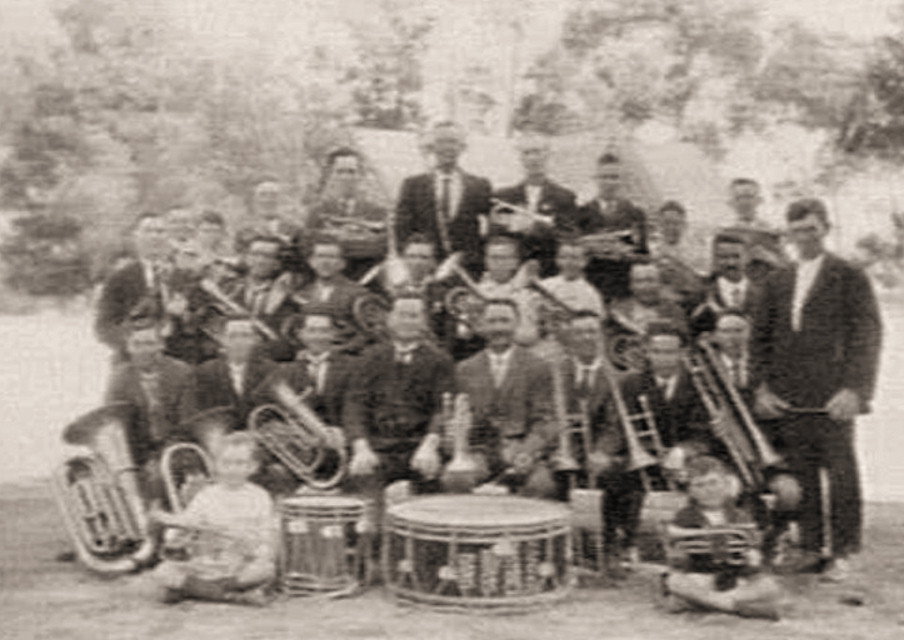
Australia Kaniva Brass Band, 1920

The formally recognised traditional owners for the Kaniva area are the Wotjobaluk, Jaadwa, Jadawadjali, Wergaia and Jupagik Nations. These Nations are represented by the Barengi Gadjin Land Council Aboriginal Corporation.

== Demographics ==
As of the 2016 census, 803 people resided in Kaniva. The median age was 49 years. Children aged 0–14 years made up 16.0% of the population. People over the age of 65 years made up 26.5% of the population There were slightly more females than males with 52.9% of the population female and 47.1% male. The average household size is 2.1 persons per household. The average number of children per family for families with children is 1.8.

81.4% of people in Kaniva were born in Australia. Of all persons living in Kaniva, 0.6% (5 persons) were Aboriginal and/or Torres Strait Islander people. This is lower than for the state of Victoria (0.8%) and lower than the national average (2.8%). The most common ancestries in Kaniva were Australian 36.9%, English 35.8%, Scottish 9.2%, Irish 6.1% and German 4.0%.

== Events ==
The Kaniva Agricultural and Pastoral Society runs a show every October. The event is currently in its 128th year. The Kaniva Show is extremely well supported by the local community. The town holds an annual street Christmas party. The Western Highway is closed for two hours while the local people shop and socialise, celebrating the season, and children have a giant water fight.

== Notable people ==
Former coach of the North Melbourne Football Club, Alastair Clarkson, is from Kaniva. Roger Merrett and Glenn Hawker also hail from Kaniva.

Illustrator Percy Leason was born and raised in Kaniva. His 'Wiregrass' cartoons are based on a Kaniva-like hamlet. The Kaniva College yearbook is called 'Wiregrass' in his honour.

Artist Marcus Wills, winner of the 2006 Archibald Prize, was born and raised in Kaniva.

== Sport ==
The town has an Australian Rules football team Kaniva-Leeor who have competed in the Horsham District Football League since 2021. They formerly competed in the Kowree-Naracoorte-Tatiara Football League. Kaniva-Leeor United formed following the 1997 merger between Kaniva and Leeor and includes players from the Kaniva-Serviceton area. The team, called the Cougars, wear royal blue, green and white.

Kaniva's hockey teams are part of the Wimmera Hockey Association. They wear blue and white uniforms. The men's team is known as the Cobras and juniors as the Raiders.

Golfers play at the course of the Kaniva Golf Club on Miram Dryweather Road.

Kaniva has four cricket teams: juniors, C, B and A Grade. The Kaniva C Grade won 2010 and 2011 cricket premiership.

== Education ==
Kaniva has one school, Kaniva College, which teaches prep to Year 12 and had an enrolment of around 230 students as of 2012. Students come from the Kaniva township and as far away as Telopea Downs and Yanac. The first school opened in Kaniva in 1883, with a high school opening in 1963. The primary and secondary schools amalgamated in 2002 forming Kaniva College. 2013 marked the 50th anniversary of Kaniva High School (currently known as Kaniva College) and a celebration was held in mid-September.

== Toxic waste facility ==
In 2018, an illegal toxic waste dump was revealed, 15km south of Kaniva. A trial of one individual about the matter started in 2023.

EPA investigators have found 32 separate dumpsites spread across the 1400-acre Lemon Springs property. Each of the sites has multiple pits and trenches that contain a dangerous mix of toxic materials including flammable chemicals, medical waste, pesticides, asbestos and gas cylinders.

EPA Victoria removed the waste from the 32 sites at Lemon Springs and filled 25 of them with clean soil making it the largest project of this kind in Australia. More than 1,650 tonnes of liquid waste and 13,500 tonnes of contaminated soil were removed.

The owner of the site, Graham L. White, got indicted with 24 charges including 13 counts of aggravated pollution as EPA alleges that he intentionally caused environmental hazards in Lemon Springs and various sites.
