= Environmental issues in Melbourne =

Melbourne, Australia

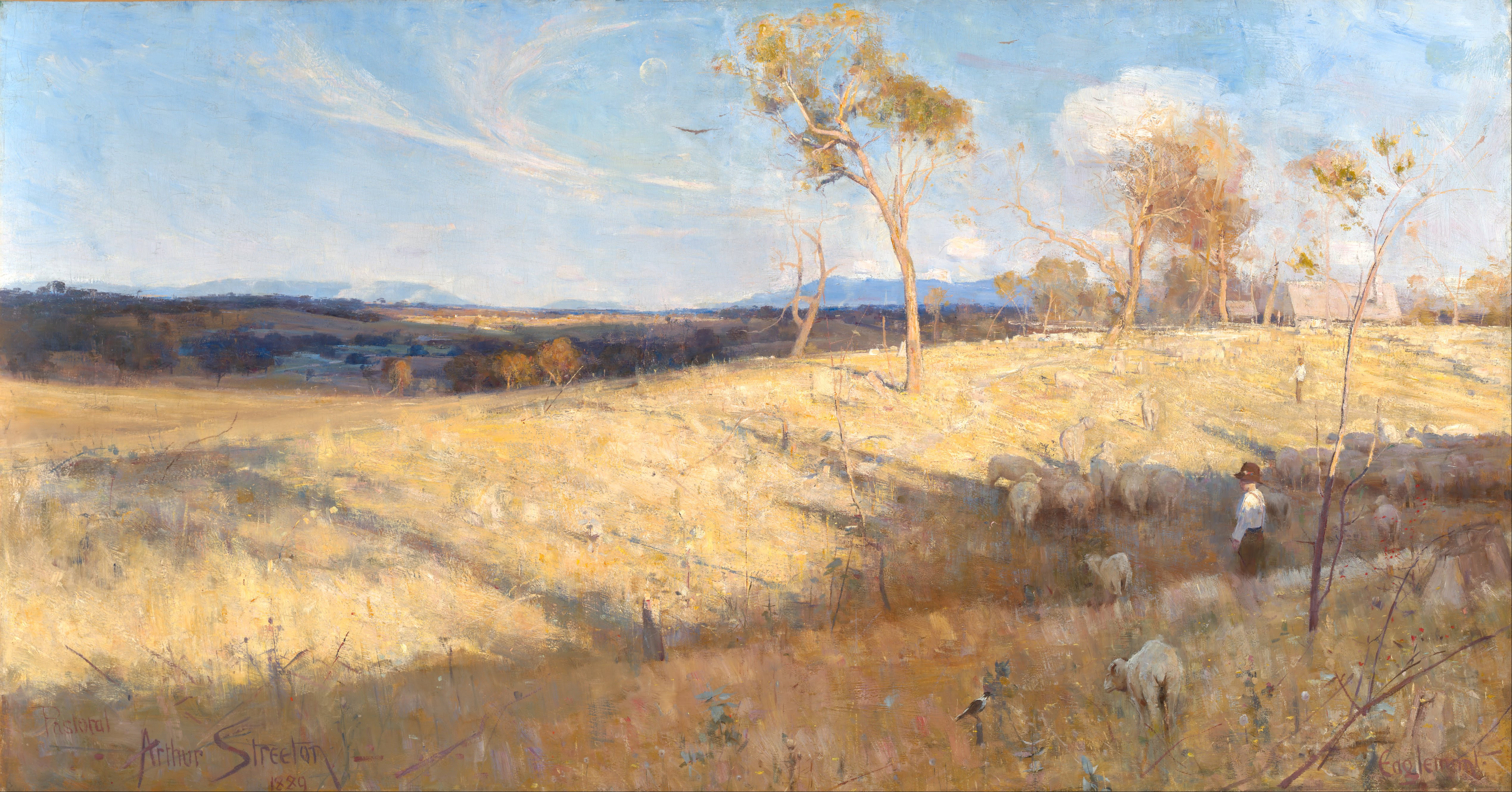
Golden Summer, Eaglemont, painted in 1889 by Heidelberg School artist Arthur Streeton, shows the then-rural suburb of Heidelberg during an El Niño drought. The area has since undergone urbanisation as part of the city's continued sprawl outwards.

Like many urban areas, Melbourne, the capital city of Victoria, Australia, faces environmental issues, many related to the city's large urban footprint and the impact of drought and climate change.

== Water vulnerabilities ==
Climate change is likely to exacerbate the long-term impact of the periodic droughts and consistently high summer temperatures which already put stress Melbourne's water supplies, with the city already experiencing impacts including reduced rainfall and more serious and frequent drought. "Water stress" is expected to become a problem over coming decades as demand is predicted to outweigh supply by a factor of 2 to 1 by 2040.

During the Millennium drought, the Victorian Government implemented water restrictions and a range of other options including water recycling, incentives for household water tanks, greywater systems, water consumption awareness initiatives, and other water-saving and reuse initiatives. But as water storages continued to fall further measures were required. In June 2007 the Government announced the construction of the $3.1 billion Wonthaggi desalination plant, and the so-called North-South Pipeline from the Goulburn Valley in Victoria's north to Melbourne. Neither project was used extensively before the drought broke during 2010, and therefore both were criticised as 'white elephants'.

== Other issues ==
Melbourne has one of the largest urban footprints in the world due to its low-density housing, resulting in a vast suburban sprawl, with a high level of car dependence and minimal public transport outside of inner areas. However, air quality, by world standards, is classified as good. Summer and autumn are the worst times of year for atmospheric haze in the urban area.

Much of the vegetation within the city is non-native species, most of European origin, including many invasive species and noxious weeds. Significant introduced urban pests include the common myna, feral pigeon, brown rat, European wasp, common starling and red fox. Many outlying suburbs, particularly towards the Yarra Valley and the hills to the northeast and east, undergo extended periods without regenerative fires leading to a lack of saplings and undergrowth in urbanised native bushland. The Department of Sustainability and Environment partially addresses this problem by regularly burning off. Responsibility for regulating pollution falls under the jurisdiction of the EPA Victoria and several local councils.

In 2008 the Victorian government launched a project of channel deepening for Melbourne Ports by dredging Port Phillip Phillip Bay. It was subject to strict regulation among fears that beaches and marine wildlife could be affected by the disturbance of heavy metals and other industrial sediments.

Other major pollution problems in Melbourne include levels of bacteria including E. coli in the Yarra River and its tributaries caused by septic systems, as well as litter. Up to 350,000 cigarette butts enter the storm water runoff every day. Several programs are being implemented to minimise beach and river pollution.

== Responses to climate change ==
In 2002 the City of Melbourne set a target to reduce carbon emissions to net zero by 2020 and Moreland City Council established the Zero Moreland program. Not all metropolitan municipalities have followed suit, with the City of Glen Eira notably deciding in 2009 not to become carbon-neutral.

In 2024 the Yarra city council adopted a climate action plan including using traditional knowledge, increasing active transport and public transport use, more plant based diet, divestment from fossil fuels, responsible resources consumption. The plan faced some criticism.

In February 2010, The Transition Decade, an initiative to transition human society, economics and environment toward sustainability, was launched in Melbourne.

== See also ==
- List of environmental issues in Victoria
- Environmental law in Victoria
