= Marwood, County Durham =

Civil parish in County Durham, England

Coordinates: 54.5753°N 1.9165°W

Marwood
- Location within County Durham
- Population: 529 (2011)
- Civil parish: Marwood
- Unitary authority: County Durham
- Ceremonial county: County Durham
- Region: North East
- Country: England
- Sovereign state: United Kingdom
- Post town: BARNARD CASTLE
- Postcode district: DL12
- Police: Durham
- Fire: County Durham and Darlington
- Ambulance: North East
- UK Parliament: Bishop Auckland

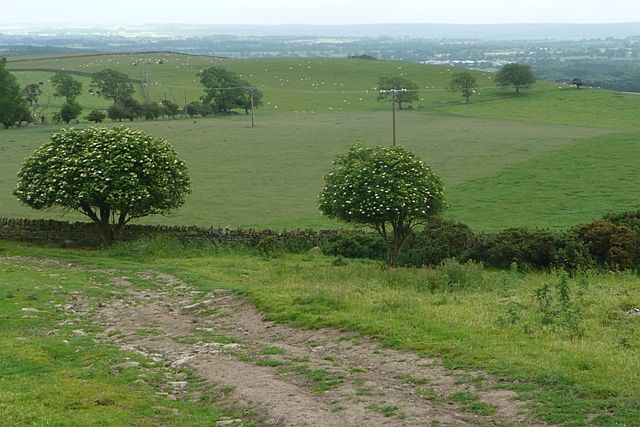
Pathway towards Marwood village

Marwood is a civil parish in County Durham, England. It had a population of 529 at the 2011 Census.

== History ==
Marwood was a township in Gainford parish. In 1866 Marwood became a civil parish in its own right until 1884, in 1894 Marwood became a parish again.
