= Environmental law in Victoria =

Legal measures to tackle Environmental issues in Australia

Environmental law in Victoria concerns the laws and legal measures taken to protect human health and the environment and tackling Environmental issues in Australia happening in the state of Victoria, Australia.

== Federal legislation ==
=== Environment Protection and Biodiversity Conservation Act 1999 (EPBC Act) ===
The Environment Protection and Biodiversity Conservation Act 1999 is Australia's principal environmental legislation. It creates a legal framework to protect places, plants, animals, habitats and heritage sites. This act also sets rules regarding the national or international trade of wildlife.

== Victorian Acts and Regulations ==
=== General Acts ===
==== Environment Protection Act 1970 ====
The Environment Protection Act 1970 established the Environment Protection Authority, Victoria's independent statutory authority and environment regulator and set out the rules that regulates its operation.

==== National Environment Protection Council (Victoria) Act 1995 ====
This Act is complementary to ones in other states and the Commonwealth and creates the National Environment Protection Council (NEPC) which goal is to ensure the prevent the pollution air, water, soil and noise in Australia. To reach that goal, NEPC makes National Environment Protection Measures (NEPMs) and monitor the implementation of those measures.

Climate Change Act 2017

This Act creates a target of zero emissions by 2050 by requiring the Government to implement strategies every five years.

==== Environment Protection Act 2017 ====
The Environment Protection Act of 2017 shifts the focus of protection of the environment from reaction to prevention, making it mandatory to minimise the impact of pollution before it happens. This act was amended by the Environment Protection Amendment Act 2018 and was introduced in 2021.

Main improvements:

- Sets 11 principles of environment protection:
  1. Principle of integration of environmental, social and economic considerations
  2. Principle of proportionality
  3. Principle of primacy of prevention
  4. Principle of shared responsibility
  5. Principle of polluter pays
  6. Principle of waste management hierarchy
  7. Principle of evidence-based decision making
  8. Precautionary principle
  9. Principle of Equity
  10. Principle of accountability
  11. Principle of conservation
- Introduces the General Environmental Duty to minimise risks on the environment and human health.
- Sets a legislative framework for the protection of the environment and human health from pollution and waste.
- Creates a framework regarding the management of waste.
- Provides a system of criminal and civil penalties.
- Provides a system of civil remedies and compensation orders.
- Enhances the powers of EPA:
  - EPA can now issue and grant licenses and permits to frame the pollution emitted by polluters.
  - EPA ensures compliance with the Act and can require action from polluters to manage risks to the environment and human health. This was missing from the 1970 Act as EPA couldn't penalise polluting companies.

=== Protection of Wildlife ===
==== The Wildlife Act 1975 ====
The Wildlife Act and further associated regulations provide a framework for possession, control, breeding and general interaction with wildlife. They also set a framework regarding the rescue and rehabilitation of wildlife by authorised professionals.

==== Flora and Fauna Guarantee Act 1988 ====
The Flora and Fauna Guarantee Act aims at protecting and conserving biodiversity by making a list of threatened species and communities.

==== Sustainable Forests (Timber) Act 2004 ====
The Sustainable Forests Act aims at protecting wildlife against timber harvesting in native areas. The Code of Practice for Timber Production 2014 further establishes standards and a management strategy for commercial timber harvesting in Victoria.

=== Water Preservation ===
==== Pollution of Waters by Oils and Noxious Substances Act 1986 ====
This Act implements the Marpol Convention of 1973 and aims at protecting the sea and waters from pollution by oil and substances.

==== The Water Act 1989 ====
The Water Act 1989 ensures the fair and responsible use of water resources all over Victoria.

==== The Water (Resource Management) Act 2005 (Victoria) ====
The Water (Resource Management) Act amends the Water Act from 1989 and creates the environmental entitlements, which are legal rights to take and use water to maintain an Environmental Water Reserve.

== See also ==
- Australian legal system
- Environmental issues in Melbourne
- Environment of Australia
