= General environmental duty =

Legal responsibility in Australia

The general environmental duty (GED) is a legal duty in Australian law stating that each person is responsible for their actions affecting the environment. To do so, they should take all reasonable measures to minimise the harm done to the environment before carrying out any activity.

== Definition ==
The general environmental duty means that no one, whether individual or business, must carry out any activity that causes or is likely to cause environmental harm unless all reasonable and practicable measures to prevent or minimise the harm are taken.

The general environmental duty can be assimilated to a duty of care.

Some criteria may help determine a general environmental duty such as:

- The nature and severity of the harm or potential harm
- Sensitivity of the environment of the operation
- Current state of technical knowledge and best practices for the activity
- Likelihood of possible measures being successful in preventing and minimising harm
- Financial implications of taking different measures for people and businesses

To determine whether or not the general environment duty is reasonably practicable, the following options may be considered:

- Degree of harm that would happen if the risks occurred
- Likelihood of the risks occurring
- Knowledge about the harm or risks of harm and ways of reducing the risks
- Availability and suitability of the ways of reducing risks
- Cost of eliminating risks

== Australia ==
=== Queensland ===
The General Environmental Duty is listed in the Environmental Protection Act 1994 (EP Act) among other obligations and duties to prevent environmental harm, nuisances and contamination. In addition to the GED, another primary duty applies to everyone in Queensland: the duty to notify of environmental harm, which requires to inform authorities, landowners and/or occupiers when an event caused or may cause harm to the environment.

=== South Australia ===
The GED in incorporated is added to South Australia's law in 1993 with the Environment Protection Act 1993.

=== Victoria ===
==== Legal framework and support ====
The GED was incorporated in Victorian law in 2018 through the Environment Protection Amendment Act 2018. This Amendment is major in Victoria as it puts the emphasis on creating preventive measures rather than managing the aftermath of pollutions.

Section 25 of the Amendment, GED states that a person commits an indictable offence if they don't minimise the risks of harm to human health or the environment of their actions as long as it's reasonably practicable.

EPA Victoria supports businesses in meeting their obligations and is entitled to commence proceedings against them if they breach their duty.

==== Waste management and pollution ====
Businesses producing waste are subject to the general environmental duty, which means they must manage their activities to reduce the risk of harm to human health and the environment from pollution or waste. Waste should be classified as industrial, priority or reportable priority, put in a lawful place and transported accurately.

=== Northern Territory ===
The GED is incorporated in the Northern Territory legislation with the duty to notify of environmental harm through the Environment Protection Act 2019 and Waste Management and Pollution Control Act 1998.

== See also ==
Environment of Australia
