= Environment Protection Authority (Victoria) =

Environmental regulator of Victoria, Australia

Environment Protection Authority Victoria

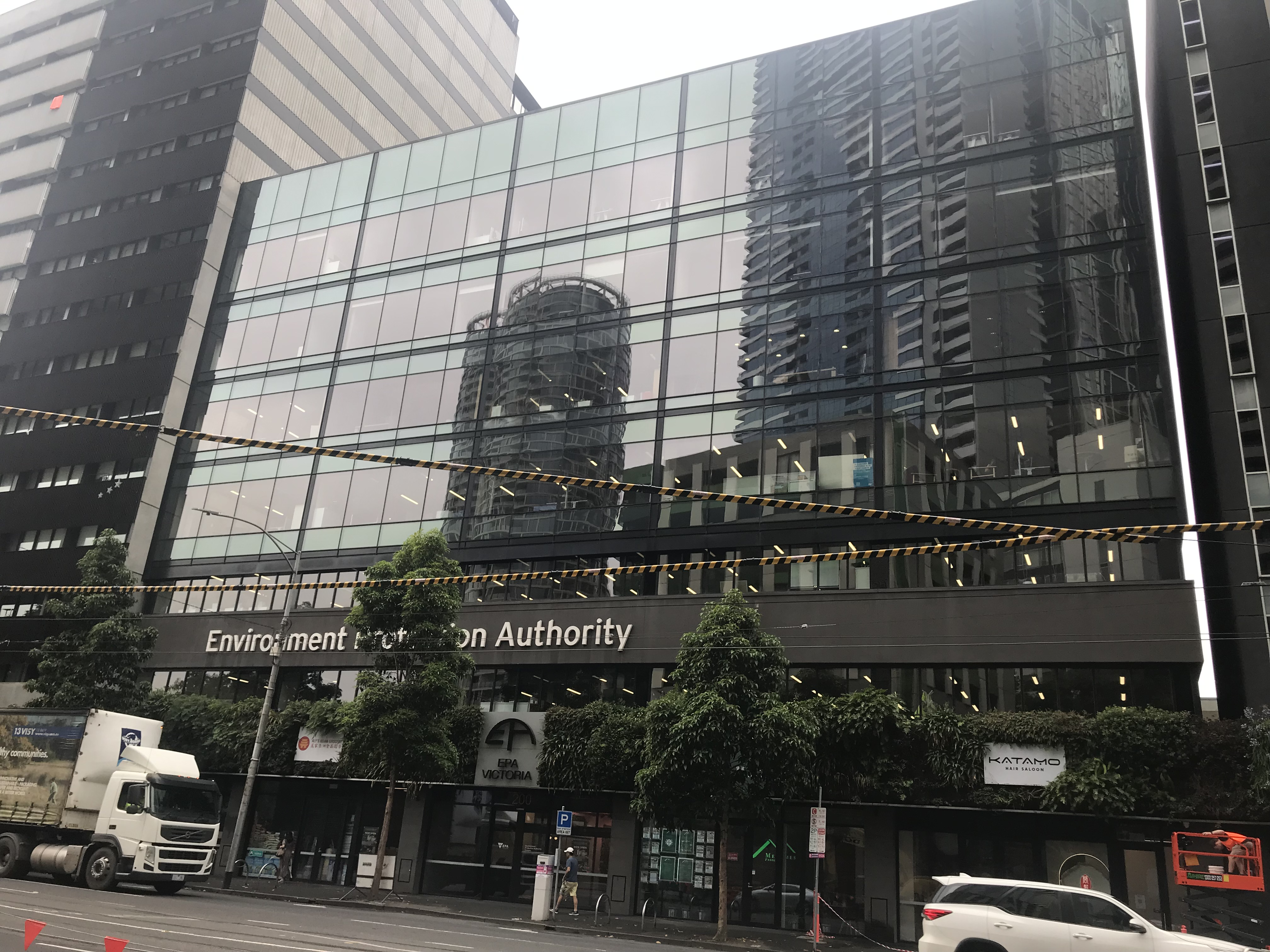
- Environment Protection Authority Victoria entrance in Carlton

Agency overview
- Formed: 1 July 1971
- Jurisdiction: Victoria, Australia
- Headquarters: 664 Collins Street, Docklands, 3008
- Employees: 600 (approx)
- Annual budget: $100m per annum (approx)
- Parent agency: Victorian Government
- Website: www.epa.vic.gov.au
- Agency ID: PROV VA 1058

The Environment Protection Authority Victoria (EPA) is Victoria’s environmental regulator. EPA is an independent statutory authority, established in 1971 under the Environment Protection Act 1970 (EP Act). EPA's role is to prevent and reduce the harmful effects of pollution and waste on Victorians and their environment.

== History ==
Established under the Environment Protection Act 1970, EPA is the world's third oldest environmental regulatory agency. It was established to address environmental problems across the state in a systematic and integrated way, bringing together a range of Victorian legislation and powers to be administered by a central authority.

A three membered EPA was launched in 1971 additionally to a seventeen members Environment Protection Council.

In 1973, EPA started assuming full power over the control of air, water and land pollution and started granting licences for waste discharges. These licences stated the limits under which the discharges could be allowed while guaranteeing safety levels.

In July 2021 the Environment Protection Amendment Act 2018 came into effect, transforming the structure under which EPA works that was established under the Environment Protection Act 2017. The cornerstone of the new Act is the general environmental duty, which states that all persons (i.e. legal entities, including corporations) who are undertaking any activity which poses a risk of harm to human health or to the environment has a duty to minimise those risks so far as is reasonably practicable.

Currently, EPA sits within the portfolio of the minister of Environment Hon. Steve Dimopoulos.

== Organisation ==
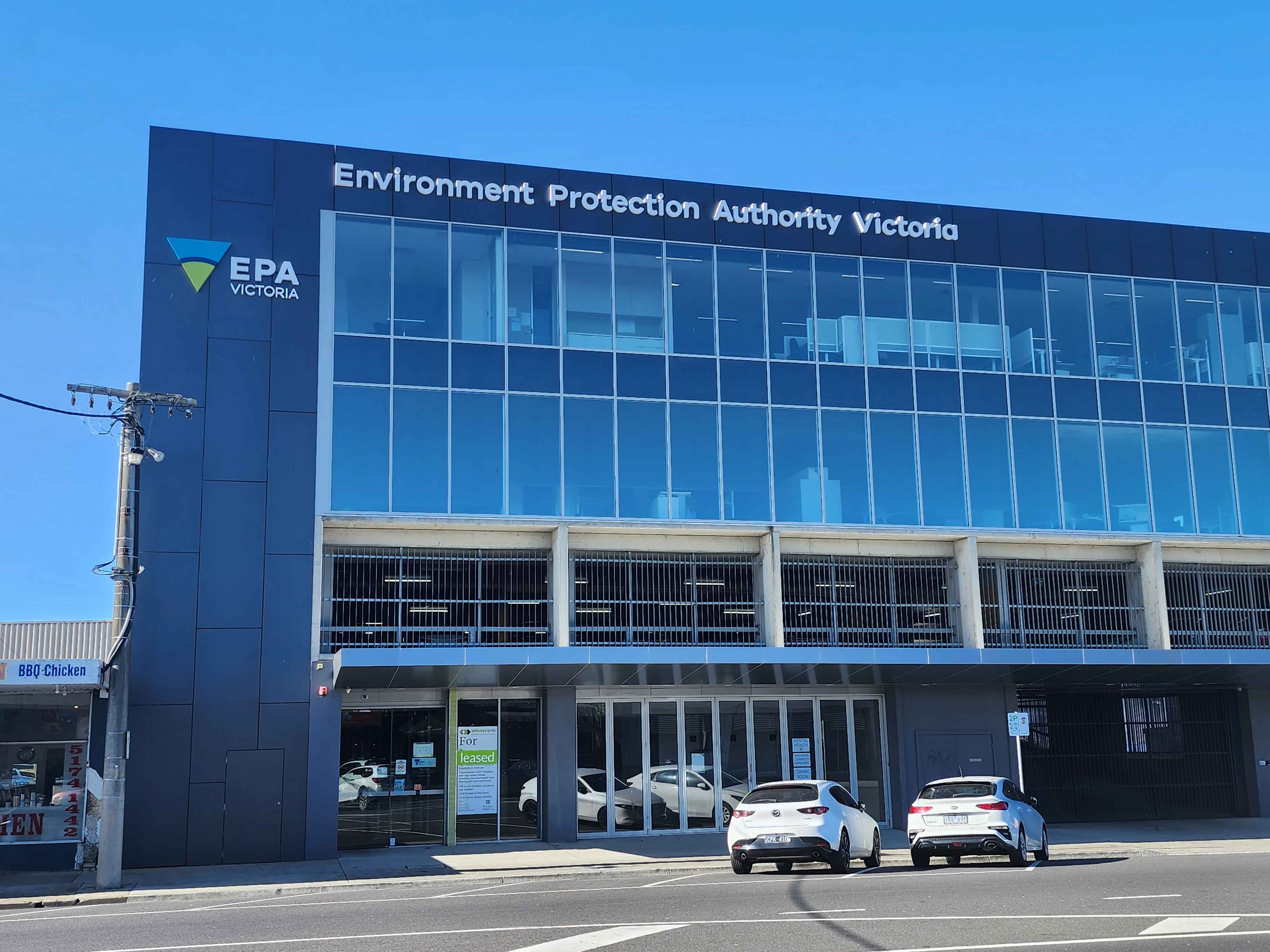
Front of EPA Victoria's building in Traralgon

EPA maintains seven distinct regional offices designed so that the authority can respond effectively to local issues and events. As of December 2019 these regions are:

- North Metro Region, headquartered in Preston.
- West Metro Region, headquartered in Sunshine.
- South Metro Region, headquartered in Dandenong.
- South West Region, headquartered in Geelong.
- North West Region, headquartered in Bendigo.
- North East Region, headquartered in Wangaratta.
- Gippsland Region, headquartered in Traralgon.

== Environmental Monitoring ==
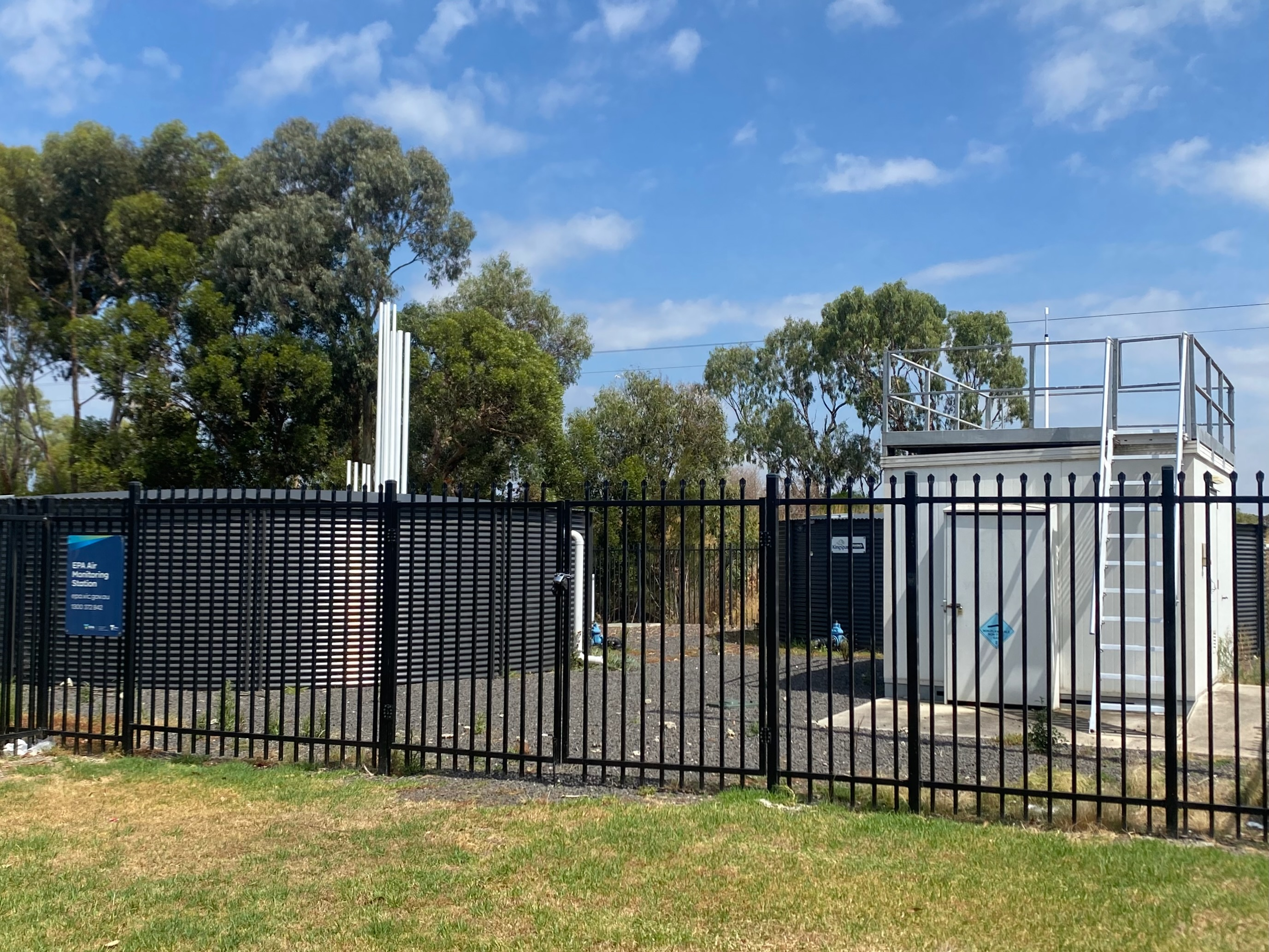
EPA Air Monitoring Station in Altona North

=== Air quality ===
EPA is in charge of monitoring the air quality through the AirWatch program and checks the presence and concentration of six pollutants:

- coarse particulate matter (PM10)
- fine particulate matter (PM2.5)
- ozone
- nitrogen dioxide
- sulfur dioxide
- carbon monoxide

within 19 sites across Victoria and advises citizens on air quality and strategies to manage its impact.

=== Water quality ===
==== Beach report and Yarra Watch ====
EPA monitors the water quality over 36 beaches across Port Phillip bay daily and along the Yarra River. General recommendations include:

- Avoiding to swim near stormwater drains,
- Avoiding to swim within 48 hours of a rainfall,
- Trying not to swallow the water,
- Covering cuts and scratches with waterproof bandages,
- Washing skin with soap after being in contact with water and showering after swimming.

==== Marine monitoring ====
EPA is in charge of evaluating and improving the marine water quality, check for pollution and risks on the Port Phillip Bay, Western Port and Gippsland Lake.

As an independent regulator, EPA works with industries, governments and resources managers to develop legal frameworks, set standards about marine quality and indicators, monitor compliance with the law and enforce it.

Since 1996, EPA has been monitoring the marine water quality daily using their own vessels and working on mapping out environmental conditions through independent sampling systems installed on ships like ferries.

=== Odour control ===
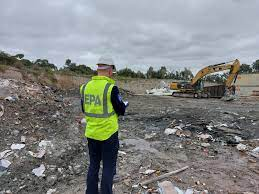
EPA Staff monitoring odour pollution at SBI Landfill in Cranbourne

EPA is in charge of handling odour pollution complaints and giving advice and guidelines to businesses on that matter.

In 2021, the West Metro Region, the Southern Metro Region, and the Northern Region received the highest number of odour complaints.

In 2023, EPA took Stevensons Brothers Industries (SBI) Landfill to court claiming that the company failed to fulfil their general environmental duty due to the landfill's continued odour impact on nearby residents.

=== Noise Pollution ===
Noise pollution may be reported to Victoria police who can then alert EPA.

In February 2024, two persons were charged in Court by EPA for driving noisy cars and failing to get their vehicles tested and contravening to a Vehicle Testing Notice.

== Responsibilities ==
=== Compliance and enforcement ===
In January 2023, EPA investigated an oil spill that was effecting the water of St Kilda Beach, Victoria and the neighboring Elwood Beach. Swimmers were advised to avoid going into the water due to an oily substance that was found in the water. The organizations was also investigating reports of dead fish turning up on the beach and whether it was related to the oil.

=== Education and public awareness ===
EPA is in charge of making all Victorian citizens understand their legal obligations towards the environment and provide advice for people to make conscious choices regarding their general environmental duty.

== Authorised Officers ==
The EP Act 1970 allows EPA to appoint individuals to the role of authorised officer. The appointed officers' role is to ensure that businesses, government and individuals comply with the EP Act. They do this by:

- inspecting businesses and premises
- providing guidance and advice about how to comply
- enforcing the law – requiring risks and impacts to be remedied
- where necessary, applying sanctions or punishment to deter non-compliance.

EPA has authorised officers working in specialised areas such as motor vehicles and litter, who only exercise powers specific to their roles. See EPA authorisations: roles and powers policy (Publication 1478) for more information.

EPA Authorised Officers brochure (Publication 1422) provides the community and EPA duty holders, such as EPA licensed and non-licensed businesses, with an easy-to-understand summary of the role and powers of authorised officers.

=== Informants ===
EPA informants are authorised officers who lead and conduct major investigations undertaken by EPA. As part of this role, informants:

- are appointed to undertake legal proceedings in a court of law, on behalf of EPA, for offences against all legislation administered by EPA
- are delegated the power to issue a notice of contravention to formally advise the recipient that they are contravening a legal requirement and apply a daily penalty. A notice of contravention will be issued where there is a major ongoing contravention and further enforcement action is planned; and prepare briefs of evidence.

=== Senior staff ===
Managers and team leaders responsible for licensing, works approvals, permitting, notifiable chemicals and planning referrals, are delegated to decide on applications for approvals and to respond to planning referrals.

Where a remedial notice requires the recipient to undertake works at a cost above a certain level, the power to approve the remedial notice is delegated to specific EPA managers and executives from EPA's Regional Services Directorate, and the CEO.

== Litter from vehicles program ==
The EPA has a litter program to enable members of the public to report littering from vehicles to the EPA. (Note: Litter offences are a "local government issue to manage" with the exception of litter from vehicles reported to the EPA.)

In 2015, the Minister for Environment, Climate Change and Water appointed a Ministerial Advisory Committee to carry out an independent inquiry into the EPA. In 2016, the Independent Inquiry into the EPA report was released finding that litter fine revenue accounted for "just under five per cent of the EPA’s operating budget". The report recommended that the EPA no longer retain revenue from litter fines as retaining revenue is a "clear conflict of interest and aligns poorly with the EPA’s mission. The availability of these receipts may distort the regulator’s incentives and encourage it to dedicate a disproportionate share of its limited resources to a relatively minor environmental hazard."

== Sustainability ==
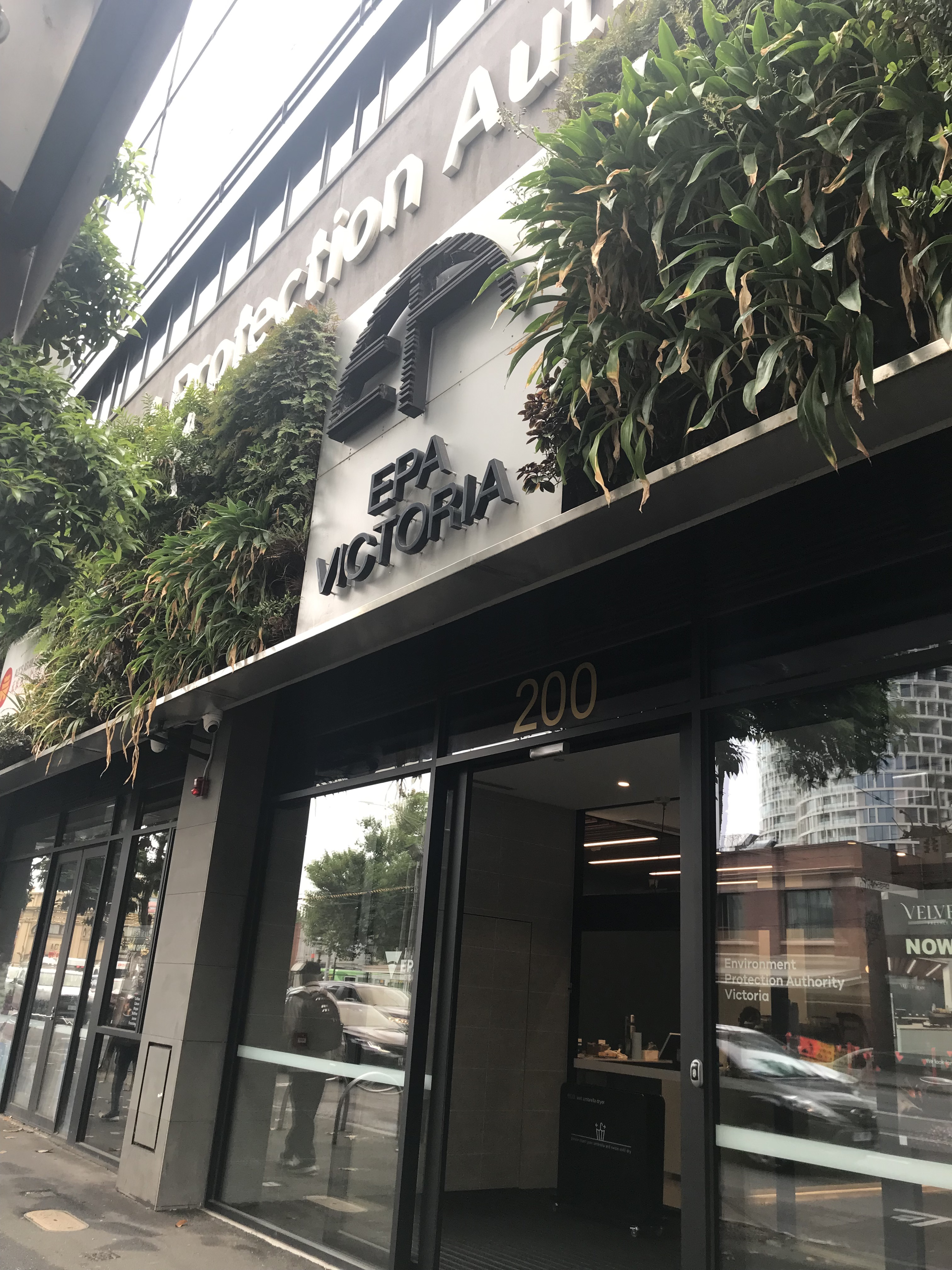
EPA Victoria's building entrance and green facade

=== Carbon neutrality ===
Since 2006, EPA compensates its carbon emission to become carbon neutral. Every year, it purchases offsets meeting the National Carbon Offset Standard.

=== Sustainable building ===
EPA's former headquarters' building in Carlton was awarded with a 5 star NABERS rating and a 6 Star Green Star Office Design. The building is recognisable thanks to its green facade, and got significant upgrades in 2008 including lighting, rain water harvest and a co-generation plant.

== Gallery ==
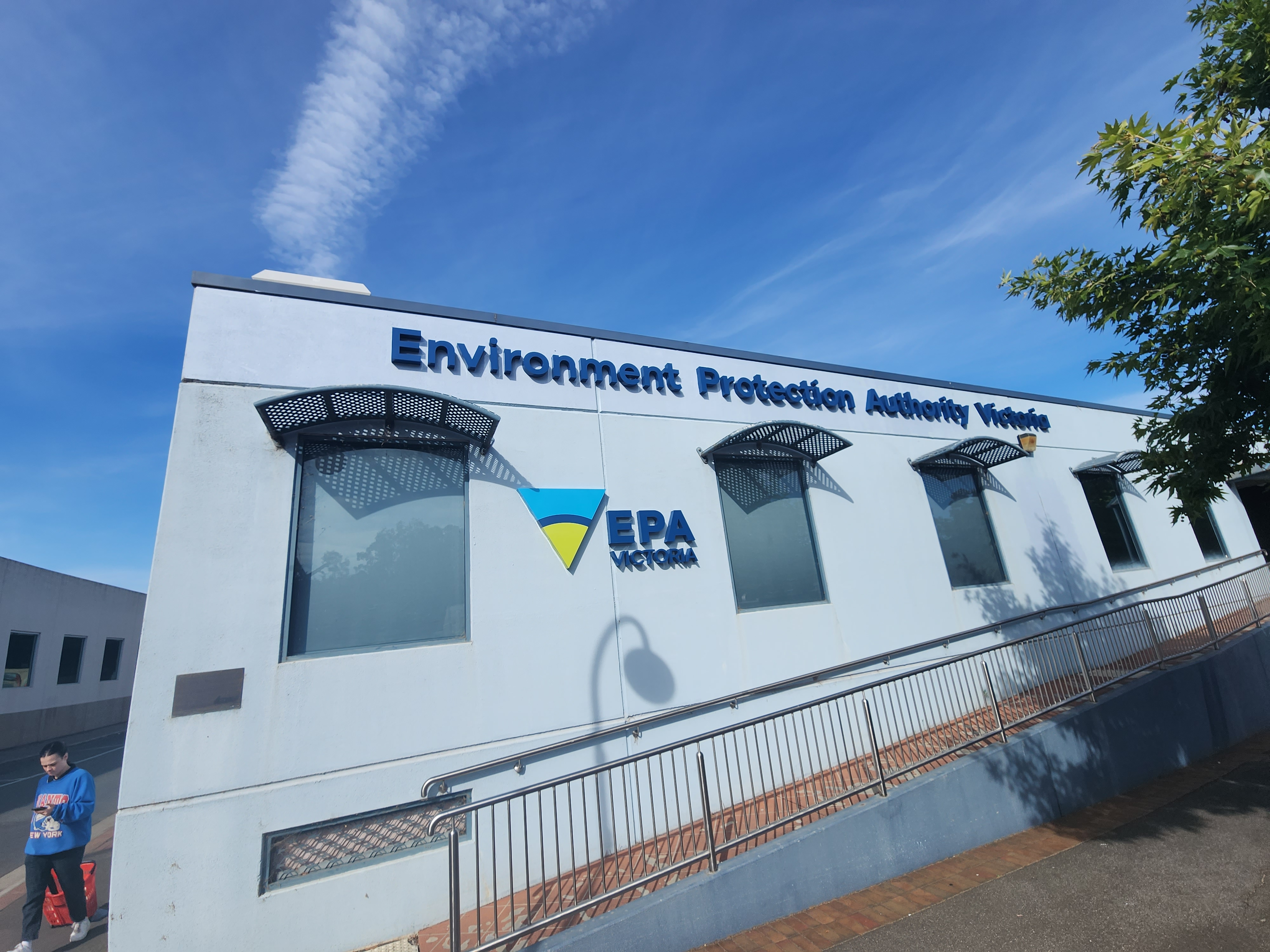
Front of EPA building in Wangaratta

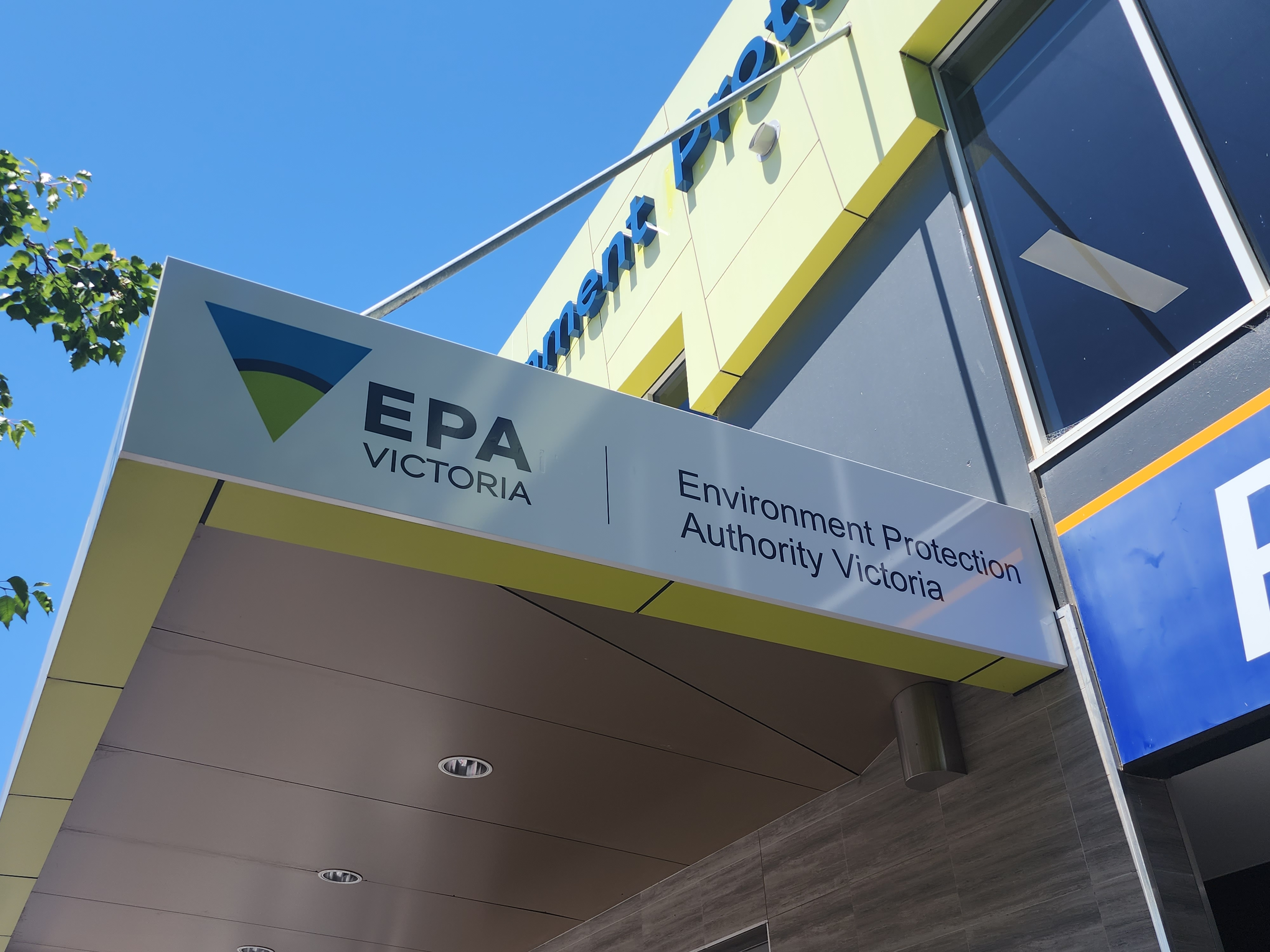
Front of EPA building in Bendigo

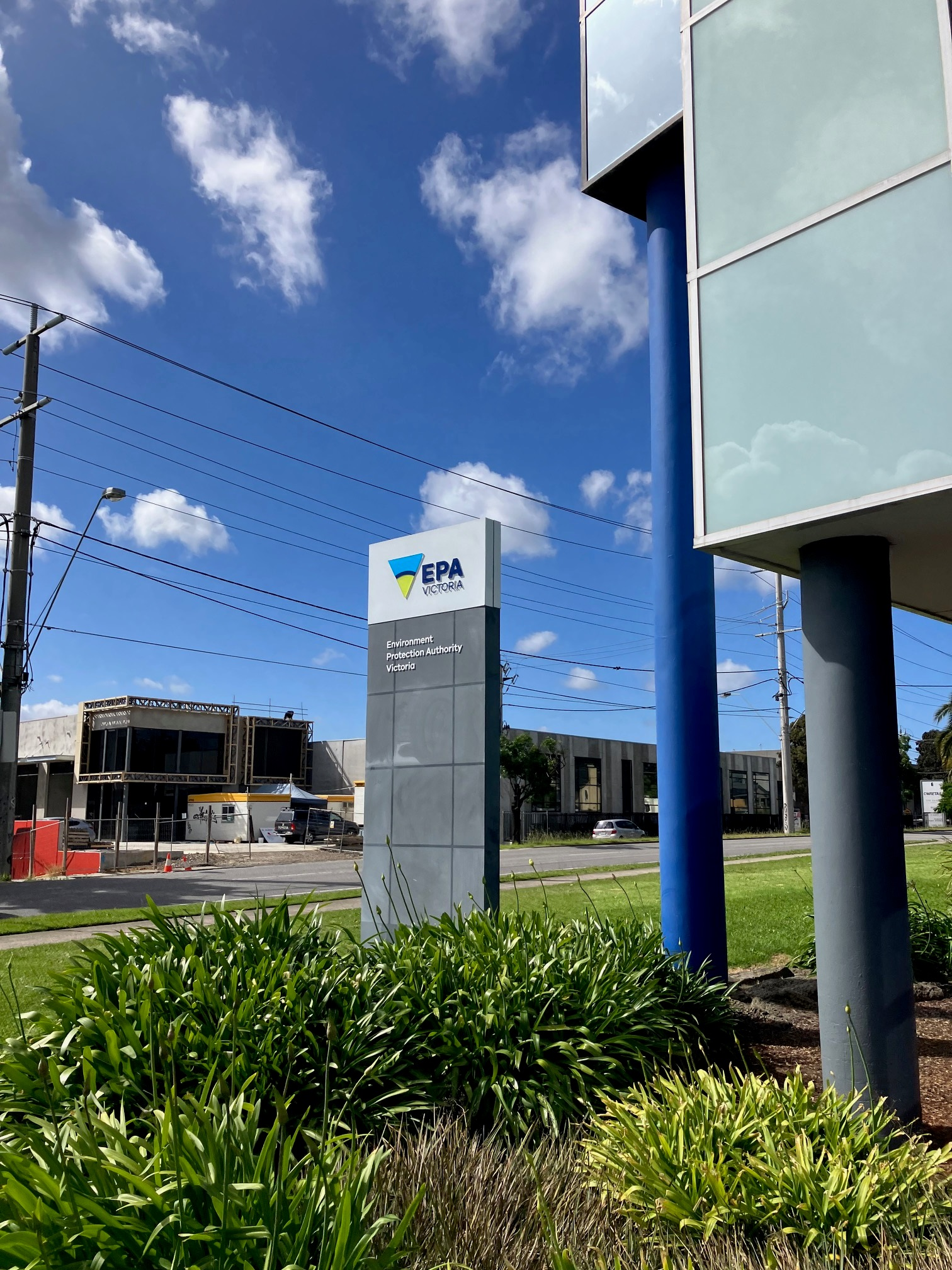
Outside of EPA building in Preston

== See also ==
- Environmental issues in Melbourne
- List of Victorian government agencies
- List of environmental issues in Victoria
