= Lasco Lascondor =

Lascondor

General information
- Type: monoplane airliner
- Manufacturer: Larkin Aircraft Supply Company
- Designer: W. S. Shackleton
- Primary user: Australian Aerial Services
- Number built: 1

History
- Introduction date: 1930
- First flight: 23 March 1930
- Retired: 1934

The Lasco Lascondor (also frequently known by the misspelling "Lasconder") was a 1930s Australian 8-seat passenger and mail carrier aircraft built by the Larkin Aircraft Supply Company (Lasco) at Coode Island, Victoria. It is claimed to be the first multi-engined aircraft designed and built in the Southern Hemisphere.

== History ==
Development of the Lascondor began in June 1928, concurrently with the company's Lascoter; the two aircraft had 90% commonality of structural parts. Like the Lascoter the Lascondor was a high-wing monoplane with a tubular steel structure, featuring a tailwheel undercarriage and a fully enclosed cabin for the passengers and the pilot. A major change was the Lascondor's three Armstrong Siddeley Mongoose engines instead of the Lascoter's single more powerful Siddeley Puma engine. The Lascondor also had greater fuel capacity and a slightly longer fuselage with a redesigned cabin to accommodate an extra row of seats. In addition, while the Lascoter had two sets of flying controls in the cockpit the Lascondor had only one to allow for another passenger seat, giving an overall capacity of seven passengers and one pilot.

== Operators ==
Australia

- Australian Aerial Services

== Specifications ==
Data from Meggs, p.219

General characteristics

- Crew: one
- Capacity: seven passengers
- Length: 34 ft 6 in (10.5 m)
- Wingspan: 50 ft 0 in (15.24 m)
- Height: 11 ft 6 in (3.5 m)
- Wing area: 362 sq ft (33.6 m^{2})
- Empty weight: 3,613 lb (1,639 kg)
- Max takeoff weight: 5,850 lb (2,653 kg)
- Powerplant: 3 × Armstrong Siddeley Mongoose piston engine, 150 hp (111.8 kW) each

Performance

- Maximum speed: 110 mph (177 km/h, 96 kn)
- Cruise speed: 95 mph (153 km/h, 83 kn)
- Range: 400 mi (644 km, 350 nmi)
- Service ceiling: 14,000 ft (4,267 m)
- Rate of climb: 800 ft/min (4.06 m/s)

Avionics
None
