= Stan Bulpit =

Australian rules footballer

Personal information
- Full name: Stanley William Bulpit
- Born: 4 September 1926; West Melbourne, Victoria
- Died: 19 April 2006 (aged 79)
- Height: 165 cm (5 ft 5 in)
- Weight: 64 kg (141 lb)

Playing career^{1}
| Years | Club | Games (Goals) |
| 1948–1950 | South Melbourne | 12 (8) |
- ^{1} Playing statistics correct to the end of 1950.

Stanley William Bulpit (4 September 1926 – 19 April 2006) was an Australian rules footballer who played with South Melbourne in the Victorian Football League (VFL). Prior to his career, he served as a leading aircraftman in the Royal Australian Air Force during the Second World War.
