= Herbert Larkin =

Herbert Joseph Larkin
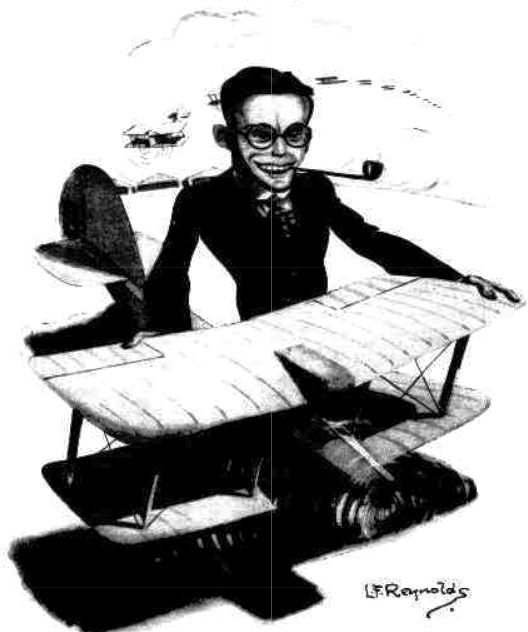
- 1927 caricature by Reynolds
- Born: 8 October 1894; Brisbane, Queensland, Australia
- Died: 10 June 1972 (aged 77); St. Martins, Guernsey, Channel Islands
- Military career
- Allegiance: Australia; United Kingdom
- Branch: Australian Imperial Force (1914–16); Royal Flying Corps (1916–18); Royal Air Force (1918–19, 1939–43)
- Service years: 1914–1919; 1939–1943
- Rank: Squadron Leader
- Nickname: "Jimmy"
- Units: Royal Australian Engineers; No 65 Squadron RFC; No. 5 Squadron RFC; No. 87 Squadron RAF
- Conflicts: First World War; Second World War
- Awards: Distinguished Flying Cross; Croix de guerre (France)

Herbert Joseph Larkin, DFC (8 October 1894 – 10 June 1972) was an Australian flying ace of the First World War credited with 11 confirmed victories. Postwar, he became a pioneering aviator and aircraft manufacturer in Australia. He served in the Royal Air Force during the Second World War, and later became a human rights advocate and author.

== Early life ==
Herbert Joseph Larkin was born in Brisbane, Queensland, on 8 October 1894. His mother, Annie Mary Frances McHugh Larkin, was from Queensland. His father, Herbert Benjamin George Larkin, was from Kent, England. The Larkin patriarch was a clerk for the Australian United Steam Navigation Company until about 1901; he then moved his family to Melbourne. By 1916, he accepted a manager's position with the Commonwealth Line, and would later rise to become Chairman of the Board.

Herbert Joseph Larkin was educated at St. Thomas' Grammar School in Essendon, Victoria. He became a junior clerk for the Union Steam Ship Company.

== First World War ==
On 19 August 1914, Larkin joined the 1st Signal Troop, Royal Australian Engineers, Australian Imperial Force as a corporal. He claimed two years of prior experience in the 21st Signal Troop. He designated his next of kin as M. H. Larkin, residing in Saint Kilda, and claimed British citizenship. He served in both Egypt and at Gallipoli as signals clerk for Generals John Monash and Harry Chauvel. He was wounded in the chest by a sniper at Gallipoli on 18 September 1915 and medically evacuated to England.

On 22 April 1916, Larkin was commissioned as a temporary second lieutenant in the Royal Flying Corps, and on 16 July was appointed a flying officer.

His initial aerial assignment was to No. 5 Squadron on the French front. He was awarded the French Croix de guerre in March 1917 for the excellence of his visual and photographic reconnaissance work while piloting a Royal Aircraft Factory RE.8. The award was promulgated in the London Gazette on 14 July.

On 22 April 1917, Second Lieutenant Larkin was appointed as flight commander, with the accompanying promotion to temporary captain. Larkin ended his tour with No. 5 Squadron by transferring back to England for instructor duty. When his instructor's posting ended, Larkin began a second combat tour with No. 87 Squadron. Larkin was sent to the squadron to command "A" Flight. He did so with calculated courage, using the potent new Sopwith Dolphins to strike at the enemy only when the British had a decided advantage over the foe.

Larkin's first victories came on 3 June 1918, when he sent down a German Fokker Triplane and an Albatros D.V out of control over Péronne. He would not score again until 21 August 1918. On that day, he destroyed a Fokker D.VII and drove another down out of control in the morning, and destroyed another D.VII on an evening patrol over Fremicourt. Four days later, he destroyed another D.VII over Haplincourt. On 30 August 1918, he sent one Fokker D.VII down in flames and another down out of action over Velu Wood. On 3 September, he drove down two more Fokker D.VIIs from the sky above Epinoy. On the 16th, he destroyed another D.VII west of Abancourt.

All the while he was scoring these victories, he also led his flight to success. He won the Distinguished Flying Cross for his valour. As the accompanying citation stated:

"In the recent fighting this officer has led twelve offensive patrols, and these patrols have destroyed twenty-one enemy machines and driven down four out of control. The success of his squadron is due not only to his most able leadership, but also to the fine fighting spirit he inspires by his personal courage and disregard of danger."

== Interwar period ==
=== Pioneering Australian aviation ===
Larkin married Vera Grace Russell Doman in St Saviour's Church, London, on 15 March 1919. On 15 July 1919 Larkin resigned his commission in the Royal Air Force. He and his bride sailed home to Australia, arriving in July 1919. After his arrival, he initially barnstormed "educational flights" in a Sopwith Dove and made fuel storage systems in his shop in Glen Huntly. Along with some old comrades from No. 87 Squadron, plus his brother Reg, Larkin founded an Australian Sopwith agency named Larkin Sopwith Aviation Co. of Australia Ltd. Larkin claimed the honor of the first night flight in Australia on 25 October 1919 when he piloted the Dove over Australia's version of the Henley Regatta.

In 1920, Larkin organized Victoria, Australia's first air derby. On 28 February, he testified in court during an inquest into the death of a spectator killed during a buzzing incident during an aviation display at Geelong Racecourse two weeks prior.

==== Larkin Aircraft Supply Company ====
When Sopwith liquidated in 1921, Larkin's agency became the Larkin Aircraft Supply Company. The company would grow to over 100 employees, and produce gliders and a number of powered light aircraft designs, including Australia's first all-metal airplane, the Lasco Lascoter of 1929. The company even opened a flying school in 1931. However, LASCO was crippled by the Great Depression. As part of its liquidation in 1935, Larkin testified that he had invested–and lost–£1,000 mustering out pay and a £20,000 inheritance while running the company.

==== Pioneering air mail ====
In December 1921, Larkin won the government's airmail contract for the Sydney-Adelaide route. However, his lack of suitable aircraft and sufficient capital led him to partner with Frank L. Roberts in Australian Aerial Services. Roberts brought the government contract for the Sydney-Brisbane route into a partnership with Larkin. The need to form this partnership delayed acceptance of the contract until October 1923. As part of this partnership, Larkin Aircraft Supply Co. flew airmail and passengers over several different routes in Australia between 2 June 1924 and 9 September 1926, connecting Adelaide, Sydney, Broken Hill, Mildura, and Hay. However, service on Roberts' Sydney-Brisbane route failed.

In 1928, Larkin underbid Qantas for the Camooweal-Daly Waters route, which would prove unprofitable.

In February 1930, Larkin founded an unsubsidized company, Murray Valley Aerial Services. In June, the government subsidies for southern mail services were withdrawn.

==== Palm Valley Expedition ====
In early 1928, Larkin had fuel supplies carried by camel train from Oodnadatta to Alice Springs, establishing depots along the route. On 4 July, Larkin and Frank Neale set off in two of Larkin's planes, to fly from Melbourne into Palm Valley, Northern Territory. After two days of flight in, they spent about ten days exploration while contacting missionaries in the vicinity of Hermannsburg; the flight out took another four days. The flight seems to have been a survey preliminary to developing the Palm Valley into a resort or vacation center with government help.

== Downfall ==
A contemporary description of Larkin noted that his glaring deepset eyes and pinched mouth displayed his impatience and lack of tact. Certainly, his public accusation of corruption against the secretary for the Department of Defence Malcolm Lindsay Shepherd in February 1929 was a decidedly undiplomatic means of furthering a government-supported business. The subsequent enquiry clearing Shepherd redounded to Larkin's detriment.

In 1932, Larkin helped establish the Australian Air Convention as a means of forming national aviation policies. In December 1933, this unincorporated non-governmental body distributed 1,300 copies of a circular, including one mailed to Shepherd's successor, Sir George Pearce. The circular concerned the methods used to grant government contracts without requests for tenders.

On 26 January 1934, the Western Mining Corporation and four of its directors sued the members of the Australian Air Convention, alleging false and malicious accusations contained in the circular by the convention had damaged both Western and its directors. When the case went to trial in June 1934, Larkin and Convention Chairman W. T. Shaw attempted to prove they had no malicious intent. WMC's counsel entered into evidence both Larkin's unsuccessful prior accusation of Secretary Shepherd and a letter alleging corruption addressed to the Bribery and Secret Commissions Prevention League. WMC's Company Secretary and three members of the Board of Directors testified there were no aerial survey contract discussions. The three other members of the Convention publicly disavowed the circular and were dropped from the suit. The final weight of the ensuing loss of the suit fell entirely upon Larkin and Shaw. Their subsequent bankruptcies left Larkin as a salaried manager in his own liquidated company, Larkin Aircraft Supply Company. Larkin subsequently left for Europe in 1937.

== Second World War and beyond ==
On 24 July 1939, Larkin was appointed a flight lieutenant in Class CC for service in the General Duties Branch of the Royal Air Force Volunteer Reserve. He was promoted to squadron leader in the Administrative and Special Duties Branch on 1 December 1941. On 10 April 1943, he relinquished his commission. Larkin reputedly served with American forces during the Second World War, though details are missing.

Larkin had divorced his first wife at some unknown date after his bankruptcy. On 6 June 1945, he remarried, wedding widow Hélène Merley Castan in Paris. He would stay married to her until 1956.

His postwar career took him to Germany and Switzerland as well as France; again, details are lacking. In 1957, he retired to the Channel Islands and became a human rights campaigner. He capped his lifelong interest in horticulture by publishing Bonsai Culture for Beginners in 1968.

Larkin died at Saint Martin's, Guernsey on 20 June 1972, survived by two sons and a daughter.

== Bibliography ==
- Franks, Norman (2002). Dolphin and Snipe Aces of World War I: Volume 48 of Aircraft of the Aces: Volume 48 of Osprey Aircraft of the Aces. London, UK: Osprey Publishing. ISBN 978-1-84176-317-0.
- Shores, Christopher; Franks, Norman; Guest, Russell (1990). Above the Trenches: A Complete Record of the Fighter Aces and Units of the British Empire Air Forces, 1915–1920. London: Grub Street. ISBN 978-0-948817-19-9.
