= Port of Melbourne =

Port in Australia

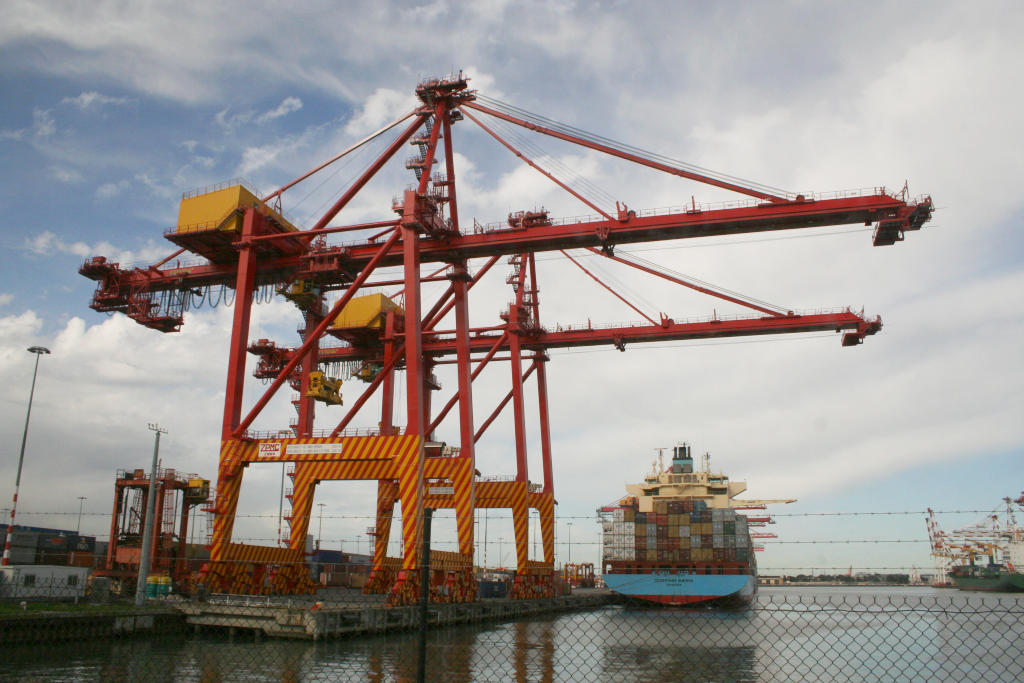
- Container crane and ship at Swanson Dock East
- Interactive map of Port of Melbourne
- Location within Australia

Location
- Location: West Melbourne
- Coordinates: 37°51′S 144°54′E
- UN/LOCODE: AUMEL

Details
- Built: 1889
- Operated by: DP World; Patrick
- Size: 143,000 m^{2}
- No. of berths: 31
- Draft depth: 14.7 m.
- No. of platforms: 16
- Rail gauge: Dual gauge
- Street access: Docklands Highway

Statistics
- Annual TEU: 3.02 million
- Website www.portofmelbourne.com

The Port of Melbourne is the largest port for containerised and general cargo in Australia. It is located in Melbourne, Victoria, and covers an area at the mouth of the Yarra River, downstream of Bolte Bridge, which is at the head of Port Phillip, as well as several piers on the bay itself. Since 1 July 2003, the Port of Melbourne has been managed by the Port of Melbourne Corporation, a statutory corporation created by the State of Victoria.

Most of the port is in the suburb of West Melbourne and should not be confused with the Melbourne suburb of Port Melbourne, although Webb Dock and Station Pier, parts of the Port of Melbourne, are in Port Melbourne.

Port Melbourne (or Sandridge as it was known until 1884) was a busy port early in the history of Melbourne, but declined as a cargo port with the development of the Port of Melbourne in the late 19th century. However, it retains Melbourne's passenger terminal, with cruise ships using Station Pier.

Infrastructure Victoria estimate that the Port of Melbourne will reach its capacity in 2055.

In September 2016, the port’s commercial operations were leased to the Lonsdale Consortium for a term of 50 years for more than $9.7 billion.

The Lonsdale Consortium comprises

- Global Infrastructure Partners (40%)
  - China Investment Corporation (20%)
  - NTS, a Korean pension fund (20%)
- Future Fund (20%)
- Queensland Investment Corporation (20%)
- Ontario Municipal Employees Retirement System (20%)

== Facilities ==
The Port of Melbourne consists of several major man-made docks on the Yarra River and Port Melbourne, including (from upstream to downstream):

- Victoria Dock
- Appleton Dock
- South Wharves
- Swanson Dock
- Maribyrnong Berth
- Yarraville Wharves
- Holden Oil Dock
- Webb Dock
- Station Pier

== History ==
In Melbourne's early days, large ships were unable to navigate the Yarra River, so cargo destined for Melbourne had to be unloaded at either Hobsons Bay (now Williamstown) or Sandridge (now Port Melbourne) and transferred either by rail or by cargo lighter to warehouses which were concentrated around King Street. This was an expensive and inefficient process.

In 1877, the government of the Colony of Victoria resolved to make the Yarra more navigable and engaged British civil engineer Sir John Coode to devise a solution. His solution was to change the course of the river by cutting a canal south of the original course of the river. This shortened it by a mile and made it much wider. It also created Coode Island, a name still used today although the northern course of the river has long since disappeared.

With these works, ships were now able to sail as far up the river as Queensbridge where a turning basin was constructed.

Coode also oversaw the construction of Victoria Dock in swampland to the west of the city. This opened in 1889.

Over time the docks moved progressively downstream as ships became larger and road bridges were built across the Yarra. The construction of the Spencer Street Bridge in 1928 and the Charles Grimes Bridge in 1975 each closed access to docks to the east. The barque Polly Woodside lying in the old Duke and Orr drydock, the warehouses of South Wharf and the Mission to Seafarers building are now the only reminders of the maritime history of this area.

== Expansion ==
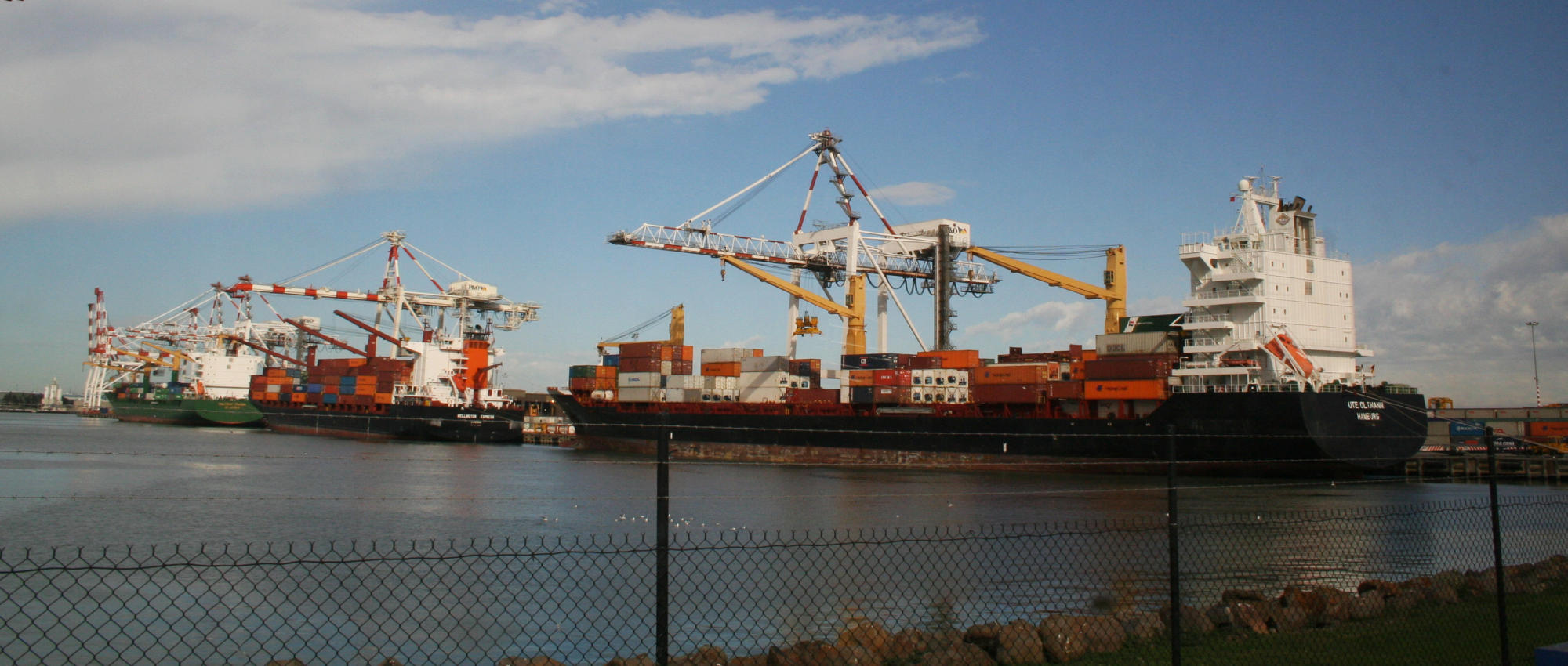
Three container ships berthed at Swanson Dock West

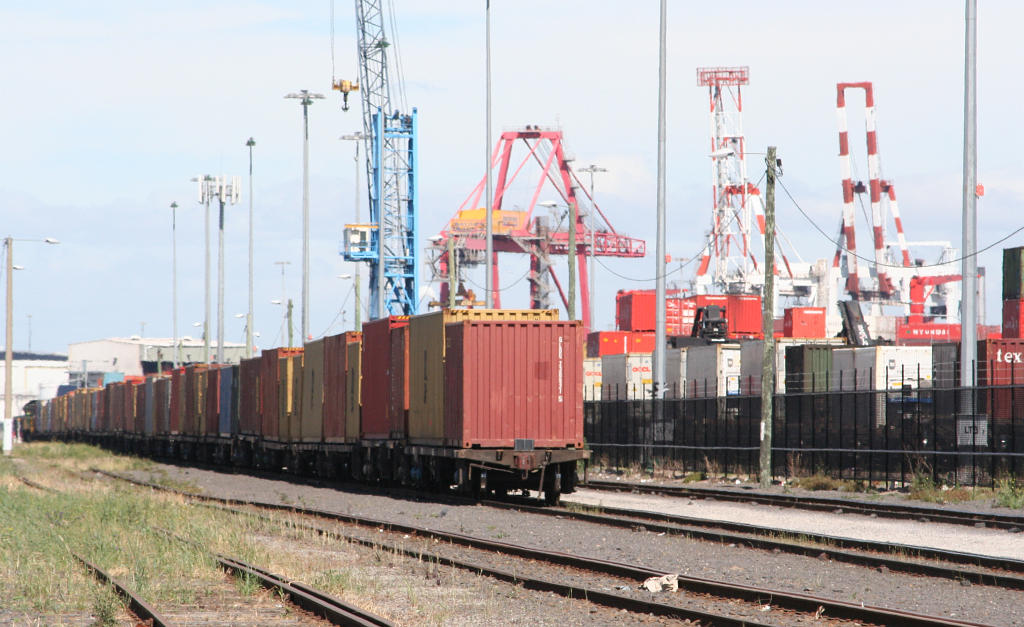
Train loaded with containers at Swanson Dock East

Development slowed during the Great Depression and World War II but resumed after the war with construction of Appleton Dock (1956), Webb Dock (1960) at the mouth of the Yarra and Swanson Dock, the first container terminal, on what was Coode Island.

Eventually Victoria Dock became too small to handle large container ships and was closed. Its fate was permanently sealed by the construction of the Bolte Bridge, part of CityLink, across its entrance in 1999. It now forms the centrepiece of the Docklands redevelopment.

In 1991 a large fire at the Coode Island bulk liquid handling facility blanketed much of Melbourne in toxic fumes. The public outrage forced the government to investigate relocating the facility. Point Lillias near Geelong was considered. However, due to the high cost involved and local opposition the facility has remained at Coode Island.

The Port of Melbourne was also the scene of a watershed industrial battle in 1998 between Patrick and the Maritime Union of Australia (MUA).

Recently further controversy has resulted from plans to dredge Port Phillip to deepen shipping channels to allow larger ships into the Port of Melbourne. This process commenced in 2008 and was completed in November 2009. It involved removing more than 22 million cubic metres of sand and silt to provide a minimum 14-metre draught at all times. Opposition to this project stems from potential environmental damage due to silting and loss of amenity for bayside residents due to the noise produced by the dredges. The project was subject to the strictest environmental testing and monitoring requirements in the world at the time. These activities will continue on for many years to help protect the Port Phillip Bay ecosystems.

In the future the Victorian Government will redevelop the Port of Melbourne to better integrate it with other modes of transport. The Melbourne wholesale fruit and vegetable market was relocated to Epping in 2013. Footscray Road is planned to be raised so that port users will have improved access to the rail facilities at South Dynon.

== Facts and Figures ==
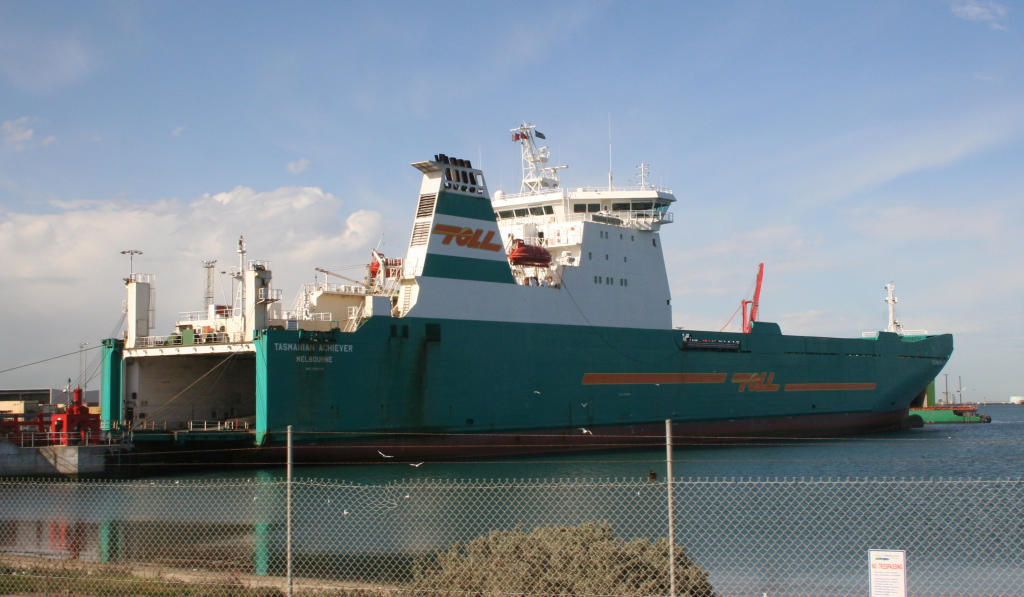
Roll-on/roll-off ship at Webb Dock

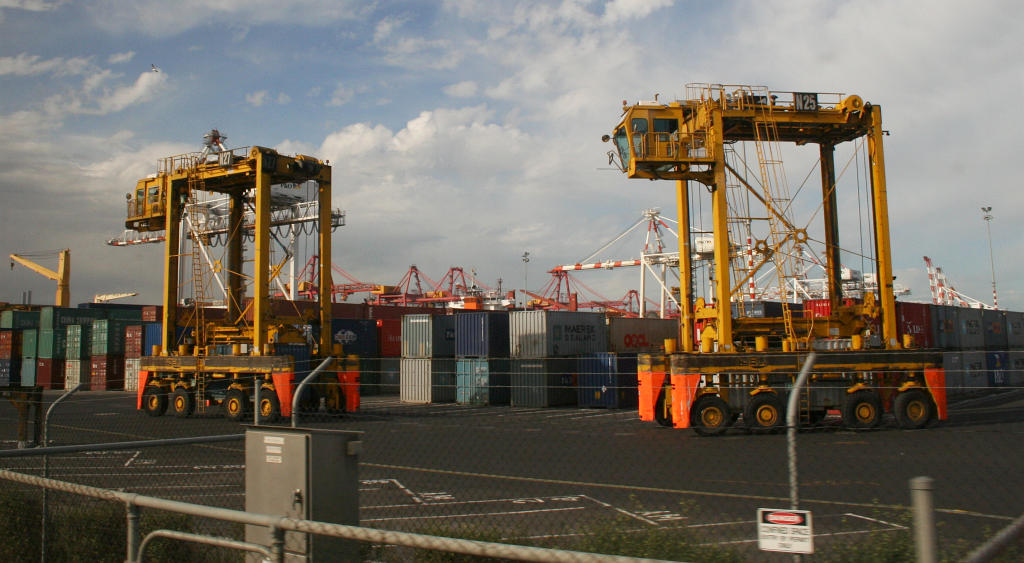
Container Straddle carriers at Swanson Dock

The Port of Melbourne is made up of the following:

- Swanson Dock West has four berths and is used for containerised cargo, managed by DP World
- Swanson Dock East has four berths and is used for containerised cargo, managed by Patrick
- Appleton Dock berths B, C and D are used for general cargo, managed by DP World
- Appleton Dock E is used for general cargo destined for or from Tasmania
- Appleton Dock F is used for bulk dry cargo
- Maribyrnong (Coode Island) is a bulk liquid facility
- Webb Dock West is a roll-on-roll-off facility for motor vehicles, managed by Toll Stevedores
- Webb Dock East 1 is managed by Strait Link for Tasmanian general cargo
- Webb Dock East 2 is managed by SeaRoad for general Tasmanian cargo.
- Webb Dock East 4 & 5 is utilised for containerised cargo, is managed by Victoria International Container Terminal, a division of ICTSI
- Gellibrand Pier is operated by ExxonMobil Australia and has a direct pipeline to the Altona Refinery
- Holden Dock handles refined petroleum products
- South Wharf berths 26 to 33 handle general cargo

From May 2003 till May 2004, approximately 3,400 ships from 42 different lines called at the Port of Melbourne. The port handled 64.4 million tonnes of cargo, including a throughput of 1.9 million twenty-foot equivalent units (TEU) of cargo. In 2006-07 it became the first Australian port to handle two million TEU in a year.

== Rail access ==
Railway goods sidings serve both Swanson Dock East and West, permitting the transfer of shipping containers between sea and rail transport. Originally provided in the 1960s with the development of the port, they were later removed and not restored until 2003 as a 1500 metre long siding. Rail sidings at Appleton Dock reopened in 2000 to serve a new export grain terminal at the port. Dual gauge access is provided to the majority of sidings in the area. Extensive sidings once served the Victoria Dock area, as well as Webb Dock which had a dedicated line.

== See also ==
- Port Phillip Channel Deepening Project
- Port of Geelong
