= Joseph Brady (engineer) =

Civil engineer and public servant

- Born: 18 August 1828; Enniskillen, County Fermanagh, Ireland
- Died: 8 July 1908 (aged 79); Elsternwick, Victoria, Australia
- Engineering career
- Discipline: Civil engineer
- Projects: Coliban Water Supply Port of Melbourne

Joseph Brady (18 August 1828 – 8 July 1908) was an Irish born, civil engineer active in Queensland, New South Wales and Victoria, Australia, in the late nineteenth and early twentieth century, undertaking works on railways, water supplies and ports. Among his more important works were the Coliban Water Supply for Bendigo, and Melbourne Port improvements.

== Early career ==
Joseph Brady was born on 18 August 1828 near Enniskillen, County Fermanagh, Ireland. He worked on the English Tithe Commutation Survey in 1842–44 working with his father where he gained skills in field surveying and draftsmanship. He then became an assistant engineer to Charles B. Vignoles on railway surveys in Lincolnshire and Kent as well as working on the Skipton, Sedbergh and Lancaster railway.

== Migration to Australia ==
Bradley migrated in 1850 aboard the Argyle to Sydney, Australia where he became a draftsman with the newly formed Sydney Railway Company, and then advanced to the position of assistant engineer on 24 July 1851, undertaking surveys and supervising construction for the company's Sydney and Parramatta Railway. He also took charge of surveys and construction of the Sydney - Mittagong line which served the newly opened iron ore mines. He acted as chief engineer, but shortly after a new chief was appointed in 1857, he resigned and returned to Victoria.

== Bendigo ==
In Victoria, Brady became engineer with Edward N. Emmett's Bendigo Water Works Company, for whom he designed and constructed the original town reservoir and reticulation services between 1858 and 1863. After a break on railway projects he won the Victorian government prize of £500 for the best scheme to supply water to the Bendigo and Mount Alexander goldfields. By 23 December 1858 he had completed surveys and drafted plans for eight reservoirs and a system of connecting aqueducts. Brady returned to the Bendigo waterworks in 1871 to construct an additional reservoir, settling ponds and extend reticulation. In 1873 country water supplies were taken over by the Victorian government Water Supply Department under chief engineer, George Gordon (engineer) who appointed Brady as engineer for the Bendigo district of the Goulburn River supply.

Railway work followed for contractors Cornish & Bruce including the section of the Bendigo Railway between Woodend and Castlemaine, which had the heaviest earthworks on the line. In 1869–71 he moved to the first section of the north-eastern railway line from Melbourne to Seymour for O'Grady, Legatt & Noonan. This work included a large plate girder bridge over the Goulburn River.

== Queensland ==
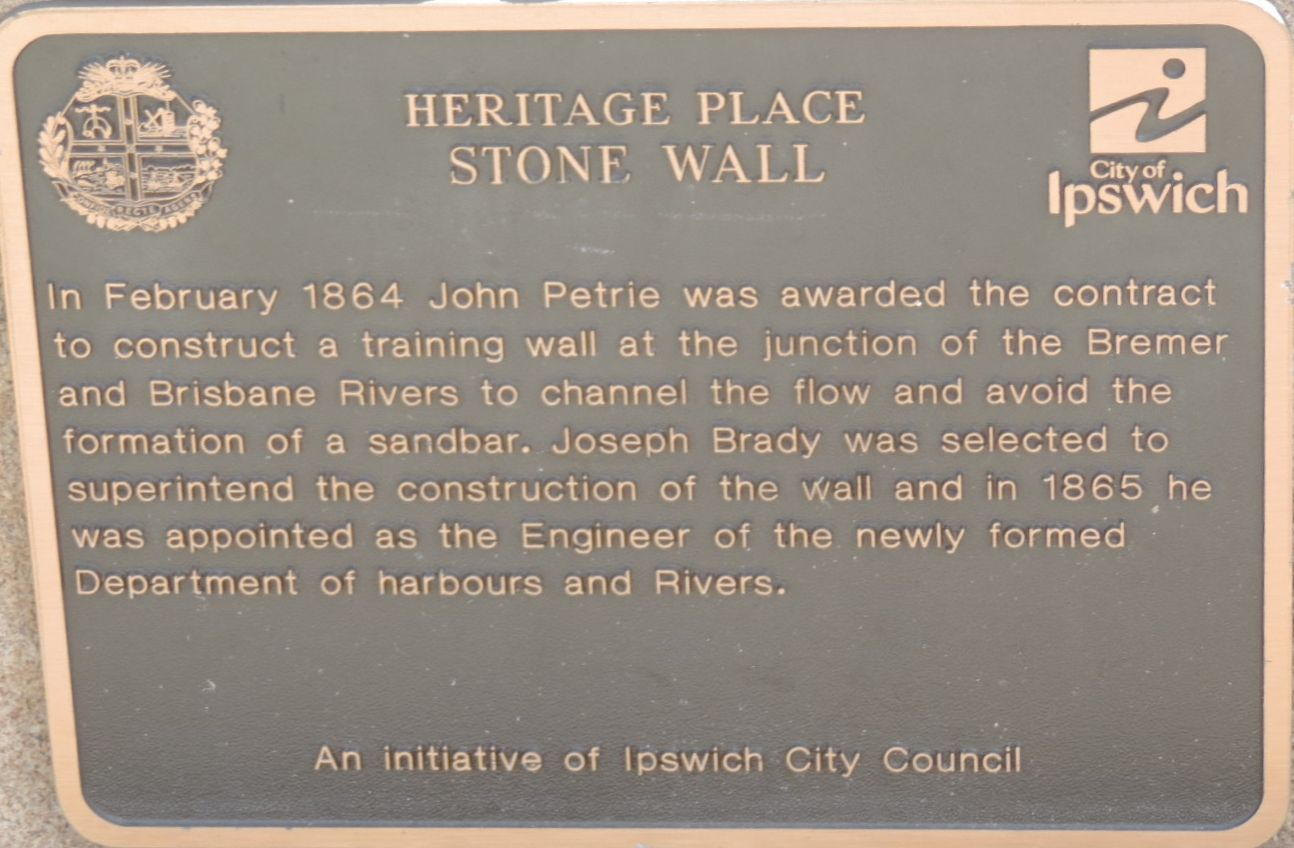
Plaque at Joseph Brady Park at Barellan Point, Ipswich, Queensland, commemorating Joseph Brady building a training wall at the confluence of the Bremer River and Brisbane River in 1864

In between these posts, Brady traveled to Queensland to provide advice and designs for the navigational improvements on the Brisbane and Bremer Rivers between Brisbane and Ipswich in 1864 involving much submarine blasting. He took on a position as Engineer of Harbours and Rivers to the Brisbane Board of Water Works, on 21 January 1865, as well as working for the Enoggera Water Works, designing and constructing a reservoir, gravitational works and reticulation systems for the City of Brisbane in around 1865–1867. He produced reports on the Bremer River railway bridge, and on 3 August 1867 accepted a role to manage construction on the Western railway line from Brisbane to Dalby which continued to about 1869. His salary of £600 and monthly bonus of £25 were substantial for the time.

== Melbourne Harbor Trust ==
When the Melbourne Harbor Trust was formed in 1877, Brady was one of the first applicants for the position of Chief Engineer. His previous success with railway and water projects appears to have impressed the commissioners, and so he won the position. While the Trust engaged Sir John Coode to provide advice and designs on the harbour improvements, Bradey was able to convince the commissioners to accept his modification resulting in considerable efficiencies and cost savings. these involved using Australian hardwood timber piled wharves instead of Coode's masonry, and excavating a single large basin for what became Victoria Dock rather than several small docks. As a result, Melbourne gained one of the largest single excavated dock basins in the World, which put the Harbor Trust in good stead for the next 80 years.

Brady was in charge of works amounting to around £3,500,000, only about half of which was part of Coode's plans. He resigned in 1891 and was awarded an honorarium of £1500 for his service. He then continued as a private consultant and arbitrator on engineering disputes until his retirement in 1894.

== Professional roles ==
Brady was elected associate member of the Institution of Civil Engineers, London, on 7 December 1875 and full member on 3 December 1878. Two of his papers: 'The Geelong and Sandhurst Water Supplies' (1878–79) and 'Early railway construction in New South Wales' (1904–05) were published in the institution's Proceedings. he was a member of the Philosophical Institute of Victoria in 1858–9, and its successor the Royal Society of Victoria from 1860.

== Personal life ==
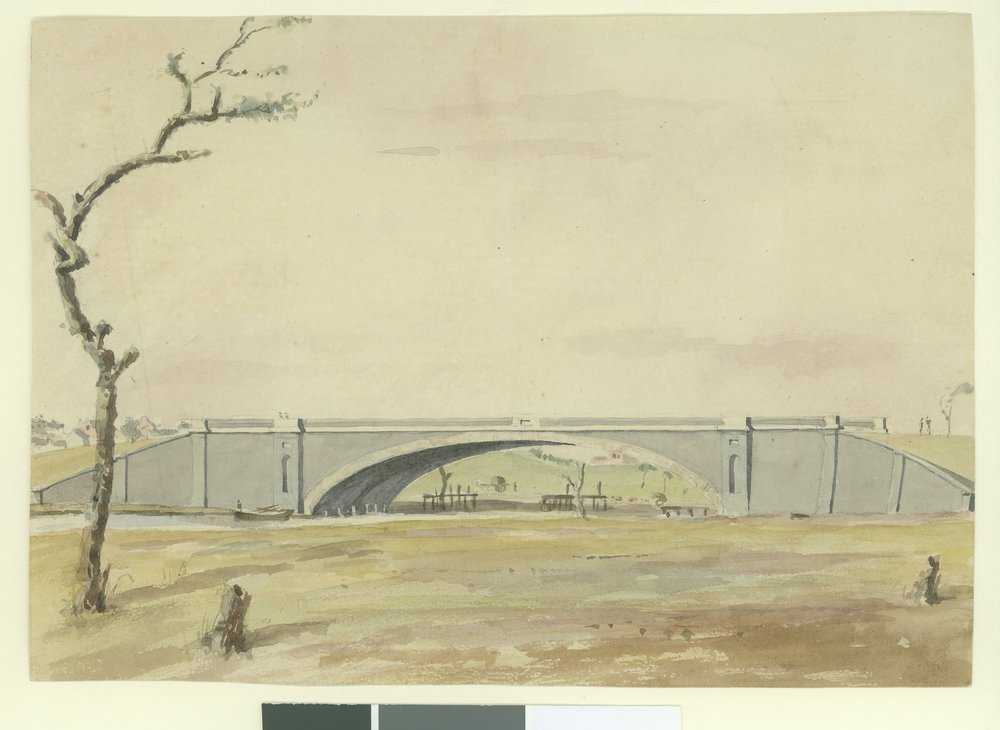
Painting of the 1851 Princes Bridge by Joseph Brady

Brady married Adelaide Sarah Keck, (the daughter of Henry Keck, the governor of Darlinghurst gaol), at St Mary's Cathedral, Sydney, on 14 February 1854. they had seven surviving children. The eldest son, Lyndon Francis, moved to Western Australia where he was a pioneer of the timber business as manager with the Millar Karri and Jarrah Co. Georgina was the only daughter to marry, her husband, Edward Wardell, was master of the Melbourne Mint. Brady died on 8 July 1908 at his home, 'Allowah', in Staniland Grove, Elsternwick.

Brady was also an artist, with a number of watercolours attributed to him including a fine rendering of the first Princes Bridge in Melbourne.

== Legacy ==
The Powerhouse Museum in Sydney hold a shirt said to have belonged to Brady.

In 1868, the mayor and citizens of Dalby presented Brady with a testimonial and an inscribed silver claret jug (now in the possession of a grandson in Adelaide).

The Joseph Brady Memorial Public Lecture is held in his honour, organised by Engineers Australia.

Joseph Brady Park at 240 Riverside Avene, Barellan Point in Ipswich, Queensland, is named after him. Brady built a training wall at this site where the Bremer River flowed into the Brisbane River to control the silt built-up in the navigation channels. There is a plaque commemorating Brady in the park.

== Sources ==
- 'Obituary: Joseph Brady', Minutes of Proceedings of the Institution of Civil Engineers (London), vol 174, 1908, pp 374–76
- John Oxley Library, Manuscripts and Business Records Collection, State Library of Queensland
- Joseph Brady - Records, 1864, OM67-23; John Oxley Library, Manuscripts and Business Records Collection, State Library of Queensland. Details
- Argus (Melbourne), 15 March 1889, 10 July 1908
- Melbourne Harbor Trust Commission records (Melbourne Harbor Trust)
- Sydney Railway Co. records (State Library of New South Wales)
- Victorian State Rivers and Water Commission records (Orrong Rd, Armadale, Melbourne)
- Victorian Railways, contract papers (Public Record Office Victoria)
- Family papers (privately held) cited by
