= Poverty Gully Channel =

Water channel in Victoria, Australia

Poverty Gully Channel is a water channel in Victoria, Australia that transports water from the Coliban Main Channel in Elphinstone to the Mccay Reservoir which spans both Elphinstone and Chewton. It includes a 33 chain. (650m) long tunnel dug in the 1870s, which, as of August 2024, is still in use as part of the town water supply infrastructure for Castlemaine, Victoria.

== Construction and commissioning ==
The Poverty Gulley Channel was constructed in the 1870s using a design proposed by Joseph Brady as part of the larger Coliban Channel System. The Coliban Channel System was intended to provide water to residents of, and mining operations in, towns in the Goldfields region during the Victorian Gold Rush.

Initially the Poverty Gully Channel provided water to mining operations around Fryerstown, and water first flowed through the tunnel and on to Fryerstown on the 21st June 1876.

== Geography ==
Poverty Gully Channel branches from the Coliban Main Channel approximately 150m south of Old Chapel Lane, Elphinstone. It travels south west for approximately 180m in an open channel before entering a 650m long water tunnel. The tunnel runs at around 430m elevation, while the country above the channel rises to above 460m elevation. This allows the Mccay Reservoir to be supplied with water fed only by gravity. After exiting the tunnel, the channel continues south west as an open channel for a further 170m, before turning to the north west, and running down to enter Mccay Reservoir.

== Coopers Tunnel ==
The 650m long tunnel is also referred to as Coopers Tunnel.

== Risk of collapse ==
The potential collapse of the tunnel roof has been identified as a potential risk to water supply to the Mccay Reservoir. In their 2017 Urban Water Strategy, Coliban Water identified the collapse of the tunnel as a "Chronic Risk" to water supply to Castlemaine Water Treatment Plant. "Potential collapse in places along its 650 m length would mean raw water could not be delivered to McCay Reservoir. A temporary by-pass would need to be installed, or the tunnel roof secured."

== Images February 2024 ==
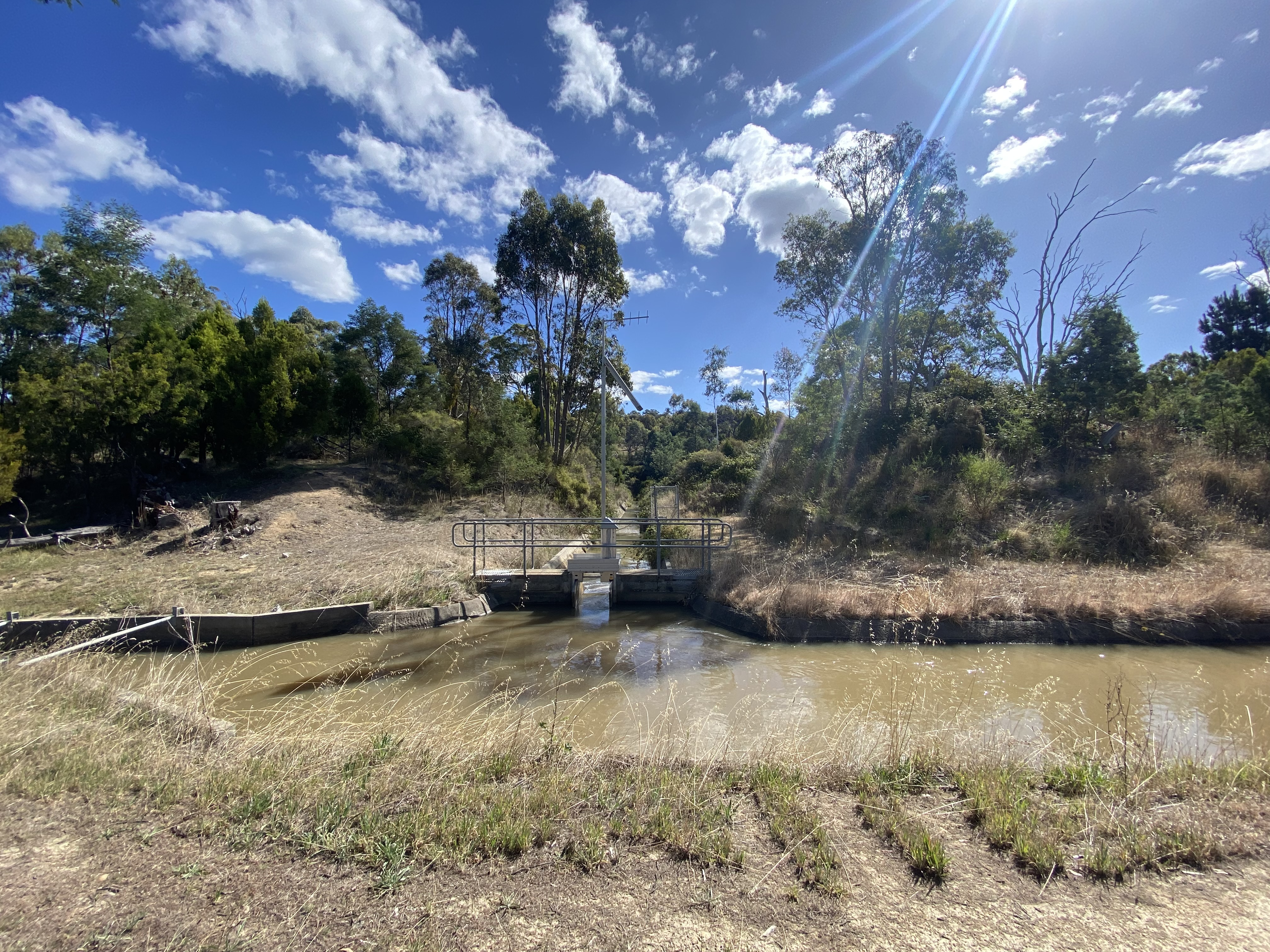
Start of the Poverty Gully Channel, a branch from Coliban Main Channel 37.08556341423955°S 144.31439044473143°E

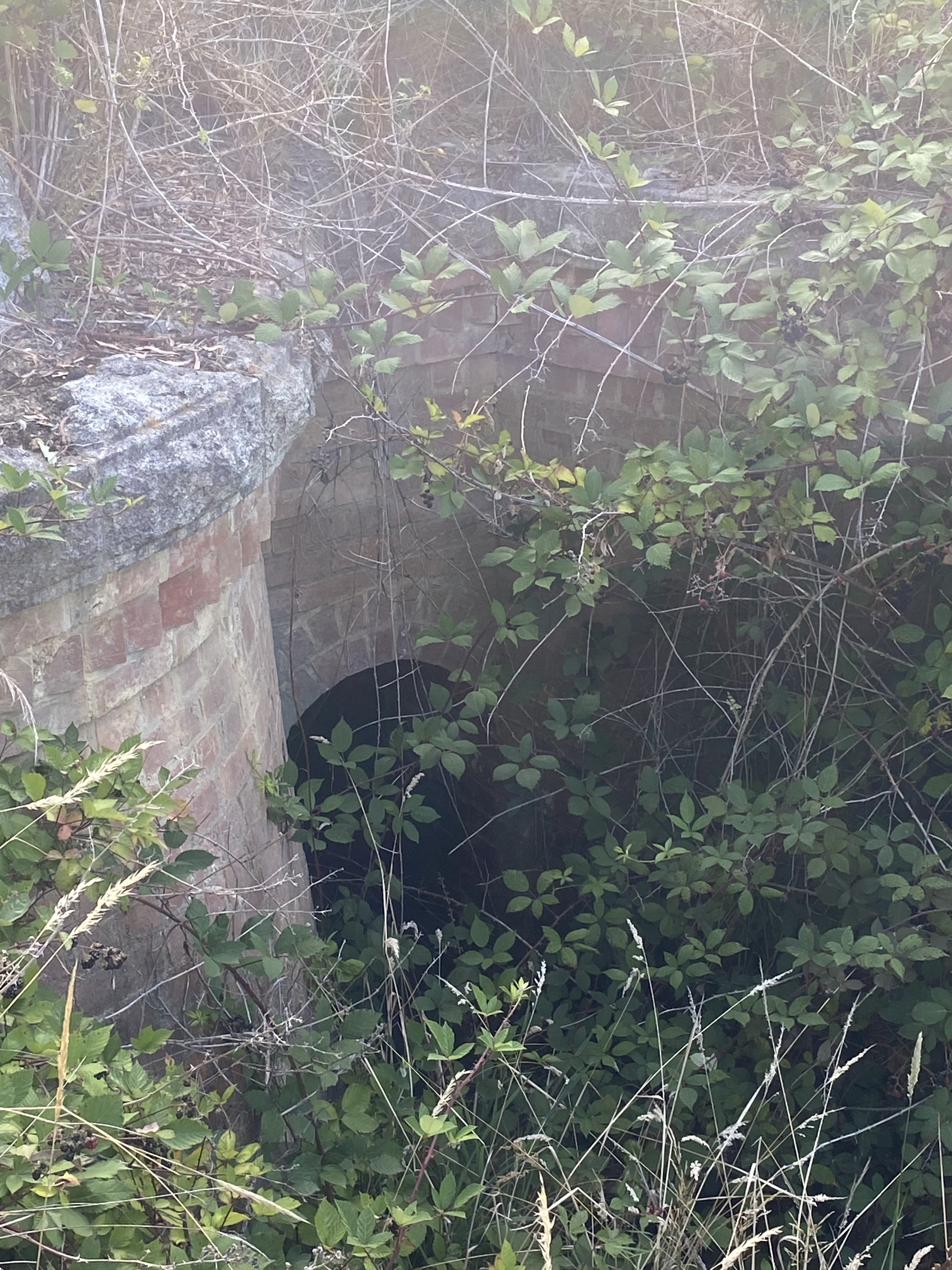
Poverty Gully Channel Tunnel Entry Portal 37.08585546485027°S 144.3135134328839°E

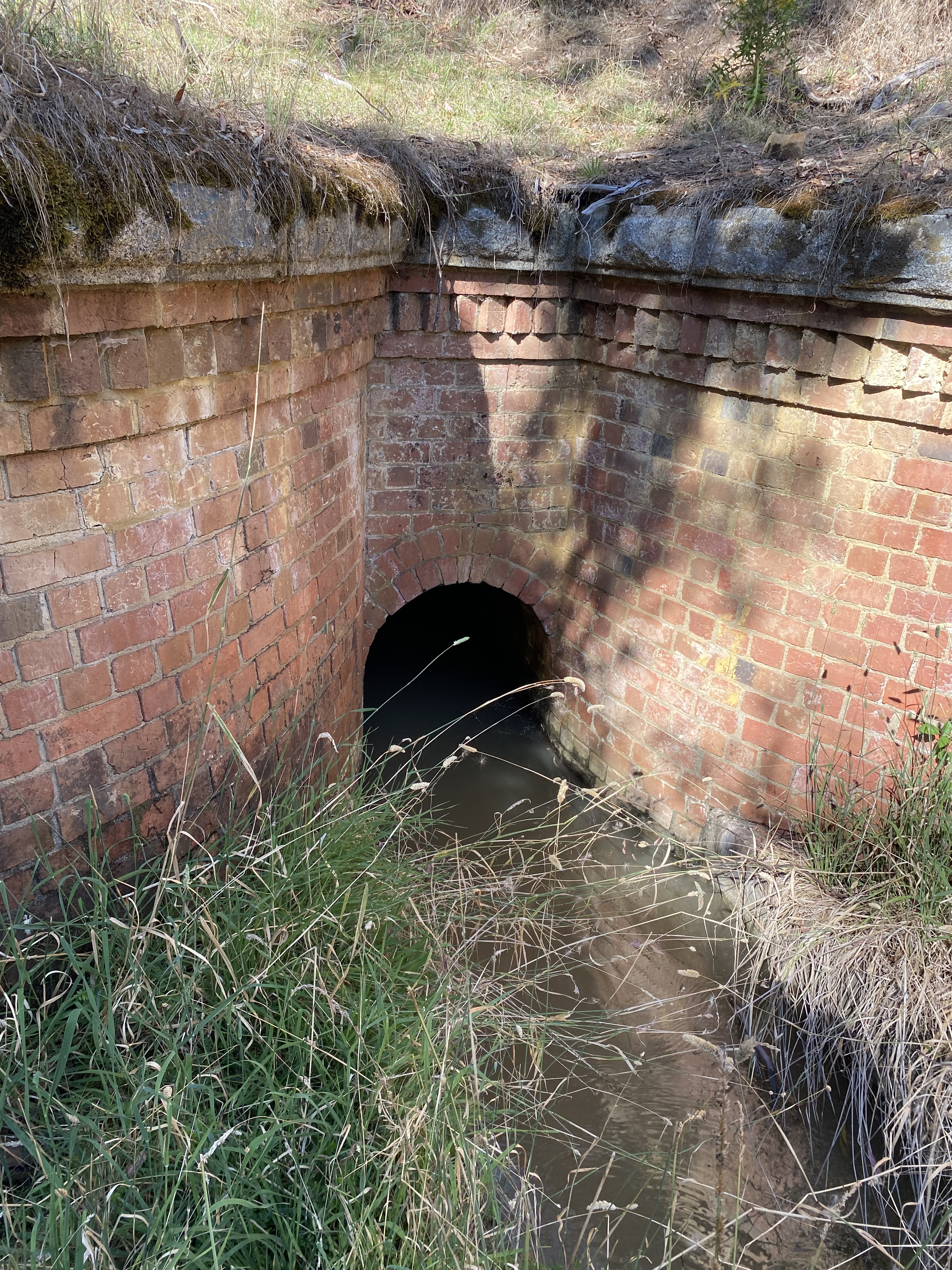
Poverty Gully Channel Tunnel Exit Portal 37.08814525586843°S 144.30670085060854°E

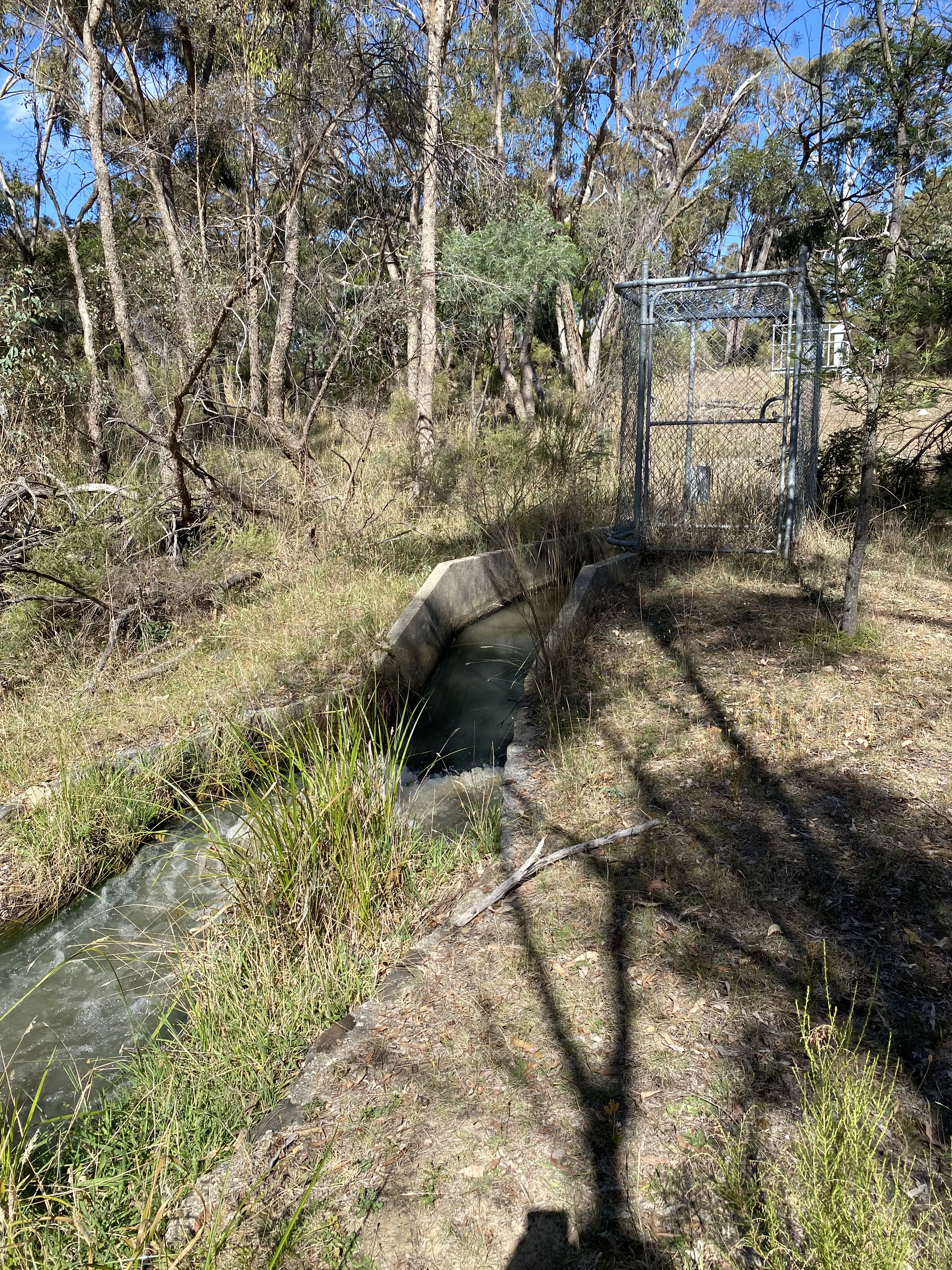
Water running north west from Poverty Gully Channel to Mccay Reservoir 37.08907513121975°S 144.3044036087567°E
