= George Gordon (engineer) =

Scottish engineer in Australia, born 1829

- Born: 1829; Arbroath, Scotland
- Died: 25 February 1907 (aged 77–78); Toorak, Australia
- Spouse(s): 1) ? 2) Violette Elizabeth, née Eddington
- Children: 3 sons and 1 daughter
- Engineering career
- Discipline: Civil engineer
- Projects: Stony Creek Dam, Geelong water supply
- Awards: Telford medal

George Gordon (1829 – 25 February 1907) was a Scottish born engineer who was prominent in Melbourne in the late nineteenth century.

== Early life and training ==
Gordon was the son of Robert Gordon and Margaret Auton. He was born in 1829 at Arbroath, Forfarshire, Scotland, while the family home was Cargield House near the market town of Dumfries. Gordon was educated at the local Academy, and later studied at Bonn and Wiesbaden in Germany, before attending engineering lectures at University College, London, and simultaneously serving as a pupil to J. G. C. Curtis. Once qualified, he was employed on Parliamentary surveys and other work as assistant to consulting engineer, William Build.

== Holland and India ==
In 1851, he moved to Holland, where he was appointed Assistant Engineer for the Amsterdam Waterworks under Bland W. Croker, and was appointed Chief Engineer himself in 1855. In 1859, he obtained a position as one of the resident engineers on the Madras Irrigation and Canal Company's Works, and was promoted to deputy chief engineer in 1869. In 1871, when these works were approaching completion, Mr. Gordon was appointed chief engineer for water supply in Victoria, Australia. As chief engineer, he continued the works of the Coliban Water-Supply for Bendigo and other towns of the goldfields district.

== Australian career ==
In 1871, Gordon obtained the position of chief engineer for water supply in Victoria, Australia, where he continued the works of engineer Joseph Brady on the Coliban Water Supply for Bendigo. He was commissioned to report on public waterworks in 1871, but the appointment was subsequently cancelled. In October 1871 the Duffy government began fresh negotiations and Gordon moved to Melbourne, arriving on 5 May 1872 to take up the position as chief engineer of the Board of Lands and Works. One of his major achievements in this period was the construction of Australia's first arch concrete dam in 1873, at Stoney Creek, for the Geelong water supply. He transferred to the Water Supply Department on 2 February 1875, where he was chief engineer until the infamous Black Wednesday, (9 January 1878), when dozens of public servants were sacked in a government financial crisis. Despite the matter of his dismissal being raised in the Victorian Parliament, and Gordon having written to the Victorian Governor and the Queen, in an attempt to be reinstated and gain compensation. He did not get his post back.

== Private practice ==
Gordon went on to run his own engineering firm, and undertook various private ventures including interests in water scheme. In April–May 1878, Gordon went to New Zealand to investigate options for a water supply for the town of Invercargill. In 1880 he was tasked with examining the stock and domestic water supply in the northern plains of Victoria by the Water Conservancy Board with Alexander Black, Surveyor-General of Victoria, producing twelve reports in 1880–81 with two more on irrigation in 1882 and 1884. He advocated use of natural channels and diversion and storage works under a system of local trusts. Despite strong opposition from supporters of large-scale centrally-administered irrigation schemes, the reports led to the creation of the 1881 Victorian Water Conservation Act and further legislation in 1883-84 setting up local trusts and approving many schemes. However, the Water Conservancy Board was subsequently dissolved and Gordon was left without employment. Debate in Parliament about his dismissal brought out conflicting views, both criticising his work on the Stony Creek weir, and praising his abilities.

He provided advice and construction estimates to complete the water supply scheme for the Maryborough Water Trust in 1884, and was one of the founders of the Lake Boga Irrigation Co. in 1889 and was also involved in the Chaffey brothers irrigation scheme at Mildura. In 1890 he was engineer for the Broken Hill Water Supply Company designing the Stephen's Creek scheme. He still took on occasional duties for the Board of Lands and Works as well as consulting to Tasmanian and New South Wales government departments.

Gordon made a visit to England and the Continent between 1891 and 1894 after which he resumed his practice in Melbourne, until his retirement in 1889.

== Publications and awards ==
Gordon was elected a Member of the Institution of Civil Engineers on 3 December 1867, and publishing two papers in the ICE proceedings on 'The Value of Water and its Storage and Distribution in Southern India' and on 'Irrigation in Victoria,' He received a Telford medal for the former and a Telford premium for the latter. He was also a fellow of the Royal Geographical Society Victorian branch. The State Library of Victoria, Australian Manuscripts Collection, contains 5 boxes of Gordon's papers ranging from 1853 to 1906, including diaries (1853–56), field books (1879-91), correspondence relating to Gordon's appointment and dismissal as Chief Engineer for Water works (1870–79) and various other water supply schemes.

== Personal life ==
Gordon married twice, the second time to Violette Elizabeth, née Eddington, and had three sons and one daughter. He died on 25 February 1907 at his home, Ellerslie in Gordon Street Toorak, aged 78 leaving assets of £8289, including £2603 in property.

== Other references ==
- Argus (Melbourne), 14 Sept 1878* F. W. Eggleston, State Socialism in Victoria (London, 1932)
- J. H. McColl, 'Hugh McColl and the Water Question in Northern Victoria', Victorian Historical Magazine, vol 5, no 4, June 1917, pp 145–63
- C. S. Martin, Irrigation and Closer Settlement in the Shepparton District, 1836-1906, J. L. F. Woodburn ed (Melb, 1955)
- Parliamentary Debates (Victoria), 20 Nov 1884, 24 June 1886
