= Larkin Aircraft Supply Company =

Australian aircraft manufacturer

The Larkin Aircraft Supply Company (Lasco) was an Australian aircraft manufacturer based at Coode Island in Melbourne.

== History ==
After returning from the First World War Herbert Joseph Larkin, a fighter pilot with the Royal Flying Corps, and his brother Reg Larkin formed an agency for Sopwith aircraft. The company was formed in 1919 as the Larkin-Sopwith Aviation Company of Australia Limited, manufacturing aircraft components. The original company went into liquidation and Herbert Larkin then started the Larkin Aircraft Supply Company (known as Lasco) in 1921. In 1925 the company produced copies of the Avro 504K. The company also produced under-licence the de Havilland Gipsy Moth and one de Havilland DH.50 biplane. It also designed and built a number of aircraft including the Lasco Lascoter in 1929, the first all-metal aircraft to be built in Australia. The last design was the three-engined Lascondor. Withdrawal of government subsidy, and economic depression, caused the company to shut in the 1930s.

== Aircraft ==
- 1925 – Avro 504K – built under licence.
- 1928 – Lasco Lascowl – two ANEC III aircraft re-built and re-engined.
- 1929 – Lasco Lascoter – single-engined six-seat monoplane.
- 1931 – Lasco Lark – glider.
- 1932 – de Havilland Gipsy Moth – 32 built under licence.
- 1932 – de Havilland DH.50 – one built under licence.
- 1933 – Lasco Lascondor – three-engined seven-seat monoplane.
