= Coode Canal =

Canal in Melbourne, Australia

Coordinates: 37°48′55″S 144°54′26″E

The creation of Coode Island after the construction of Coode Canal in 1880–1892 (Light blue indicating original path of the Yarra River)

Coode Canal is a reach of the lower Yarra River in Melbourne, the capital city of the Australian state of Victoria. The canal was excavated in 1886, as part of harbour improvements designed by Sir John Coode to improve access for ships to Melbourne's main river docks. It created Coode Island and caused the shallow, narrow and winding Fishermans Bend to be cut off along with other sections of the river including Humbug Reach and the original junction with the Maribyrnong River (or Saltwater River).

Coode Canal and Victoria Dock received an Engineering Heritage Marker from Engineers Australia as part of its Engineering Heritage Recognition Program.

== See also ==
- West Melbourne, Victoria
- Canals in Australia
