= Coode Island =

Former island in Victoria, Australia

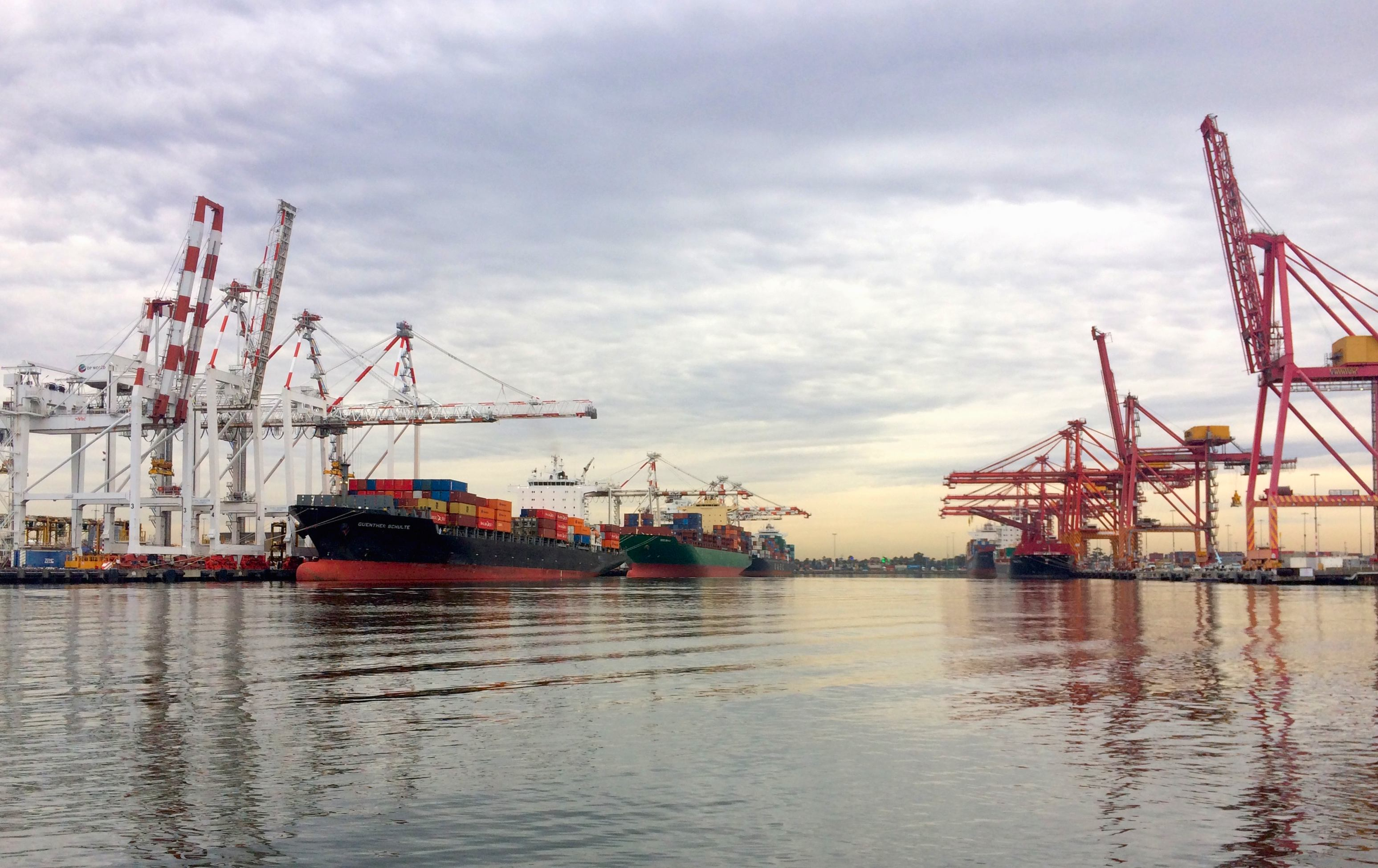
- Container docks along the eastern side of the island

- Coordinates: 37°48′53″S 144°54′35″E
- Country: Australia
- State: Victoria
- Region: West Melbourne

Area
  - Total: 0.97 km^{2} (0.37 sq mi)
- Elevation: 5 m (16 ft)

Coode Island is a former island at the convergence of the Yarra and Maribyrnong Rivers, 4 km west of central Melbourne, Australia. The island was formed by the excavation of the Coode Canal in 1887, and became connected to the mainland in the 1930s. Today the low-lying land is part of the Port of Melbourne, and is used as the site of Swanson and Appleton Docks and their associated container storage and rail yards, as well as a number of chemical storage facilities.

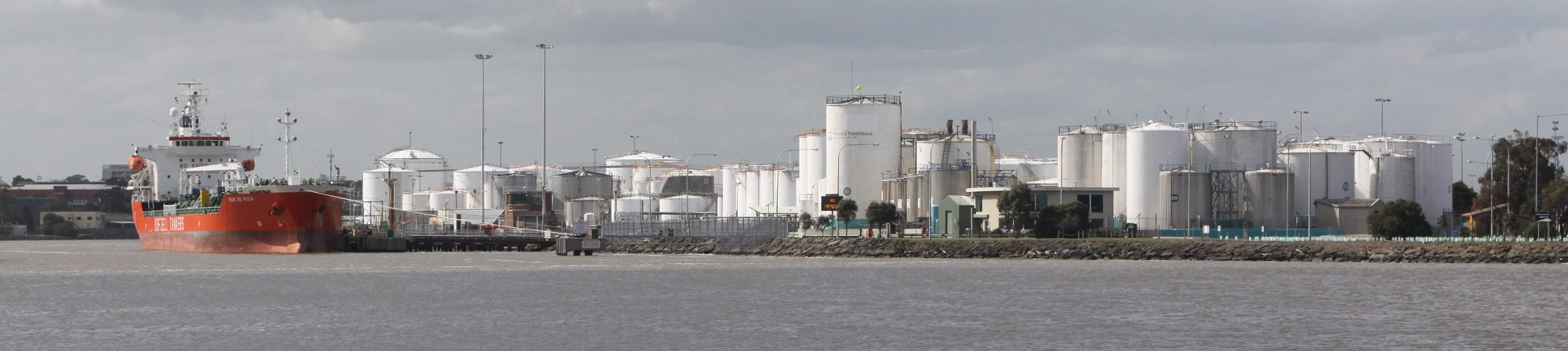
Coode Island viewed from the junction of the Yarra and Maribyrnong Rivers

== History ==
Map of Coode Island after the Coode Canal was cut in 1886, diverting the flow of the Yarra River

Before the 1880s, the area of Coode Island was an expansive low-lying wetland. The island became isolated from the mainland after the Coode Canal was dug in 1886, to shorten, widen and deepen the Yarra River. A shipping canal was constructed to the south of the existing course of the river through Fishermans Bend, to allow access from the Port of Melbourne to Yarraville. The boundaries were the canal on the south, the Maribyrnong River on the west, and the Yarra River on the north and east. Once formed, the island became an industrial area of 97 hectares.

The island was named after Sir John Coode, an English harbour engineer who had been engaged by the Melbourne Harbor Trust to select the optimum route for the canal as part of the Port of Melbourne. The original course of the Yarra River was gradually filled in over the years, along with the associated swamps. By the mid-twentieth century, Coode Island was no longer an island, although the name remained.

By 1909, the area was being used as an animal quarantine station and, after 1915, as a sanatorium for victims of bubonic plague and other contagious diseases. By the 1920s, the area was inhabited by people living in huts and abandoned ships. In 1927, the Larkin Aircraft Supply Company had set up operations on the island, including a factory and aerodrome, which was used until World War II.

In 1960, the area began to be used for the storage of petrochemicals. In 1968, the Swanson Dock container terminal was constructed on the south side of the former island, which reduced its size.

On 21 August 1991, a storage tank caught fire at the Anchor Tank facility on Coode Island, probably due to St. Elmo's fire, resulting in an explosion. About 8.5 million litres of organic compounds burned, including acrylonitrile and benzene, creating a toxic cloud over nearby residential suburbs, which was dispersed by strong winds. The ignition spread between tanks through a common vent system. Tank blanketing had been considered unnecessary when the tanks were designed, and the common vent system was later installed to allow recovery of fumes for environmental reasons.

Proposals were made to move the facility to Point Lillias near Geelong, but environmental and Aboriginal heritage concerns thwarted the plans. In 2000 the Bracks Government announced that Coode Island would be the site of Victoria's major petrochemical storage facility, with six companies leasing the facility from the Melbourne Port Authority.
