= De Havilland DH.50 =

1923 British airliner series

DH.50
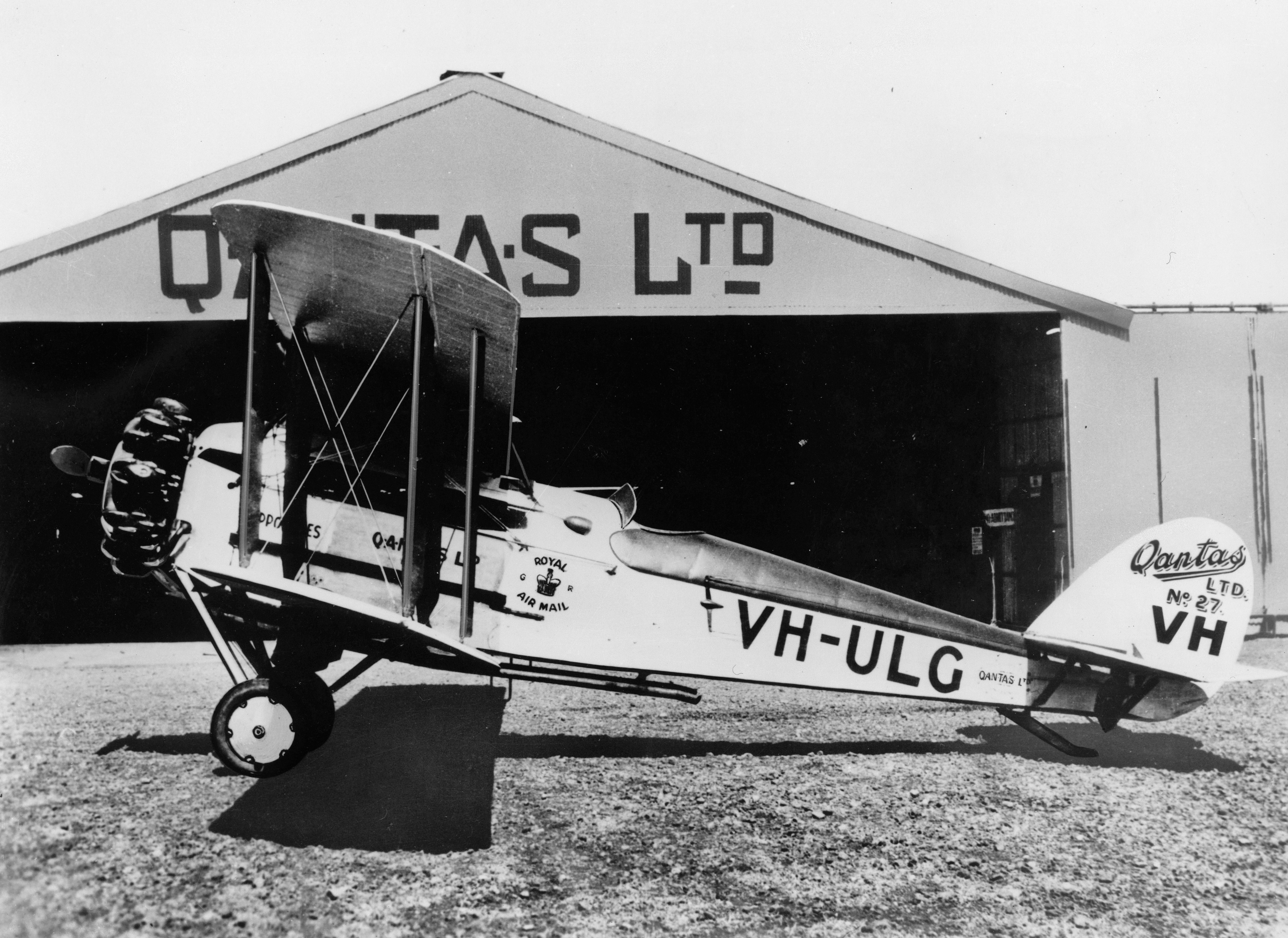
- A DH.50J of Qantas

General information
- Type: Transport biplane
- Manufacturer: de Havilland
- Primary users: Qantas Imperial Airways
- Number built: 38

History
- Introduction date: 1923
- First flight: 30 July 1923
- Retired: 1942

The de Havilland DH.50 was a 1920s British large single-engined biplane transport built by de Havilland at Stag Lane Aerodrome, Edgware, and licence-built in Australia, Belgium, and Czechoslovakia.

== History ==
In the early 1920s, Geoffrey de Havilland realised that war surplus aircraft would need replacing, so his company designed a four-passenger-cabin biplane, the DH.50, using experience gained with the earlier de Havilland DH.9. The first DH.50 (registered G-EBFN) flew in August 1923 and was used within a few days by Alan Cobham to win a prize for reliability during trial flights between Copenhagen and Gothenburg. Only 17 aircraft were built by de Havilland; the rest were produced under licence. The different aircraft had a wide variety of engine fits.

In 1924, Cobham won the King's Cup Race air race in G-EBFN averaging 106 mph (171 km/h). Cobham made several long-range flights with the prototype until he replaced it with the second aircraft. The second aircraft (registered G-EBFO) was re-engined with the Armstrong Siddeley Jaguar engine and was designated the DH.50J. Cobham flew the aircraft on a 16,000 mi (25,750 km) flight from Croydon Airport to Cape Town between November 1925 and February 1926. The aircraft was later fitted with twin floats (produced by Short Brothers at Rochester) for a survey flight of Australia in 1926. On the outward flight from England to Australia, Cobham's engineer (A.B. Elliot) was shot and killed when they were overflying the desert between Baghdad and Basra. He was replaced by Sergeant Ward, a Royal Air Force engineer who was given permission to join the flight by his commanding officer. Also in 1926, a DH.50A floatplane was used in the first international flight made by the Royal Australian Air Force. The Chief of the Air Staff, Group Captain Richard Williams, and two crew members undertook a three-month, 10,000 mi (16,093 km) round trip from Point Cook, Victoria to the Pacific Islands.

=== Licence production ===
The aircraft was popular in Australia and de Havilland licensed its production there, leading to 16 aircraft being built. Qantas built four DH.50As and three DH.50Js, Western Australian Airlines built three DH.50As, and Larkin Aircraft Supply Company built one DH.50A. SABCA built three Puma-engined DH.50As in Brussels, Belgium for use by SABENA on routes in the Belgian Congo. The last one survived until 1937. Aero built seven in Prague, then in Czechoslovakia. The British-built QANTAS DH.50 (G-AUER/VH-UER) was modified in Longreach, Queensland, to suit the Australian Inland Mission as an aerial ambulance. The aircraft was called Victory by the Rev. J Flynn and was the first aircraft used by the Royal Flying Doctor Service. One of the Australian produced machines stalled, leading to a crash and death of pilot Robert McConachy (who was also an aeroplane designer) in 1940.

== Variants ==
- DH.50 : Single-engined light transport biplane.

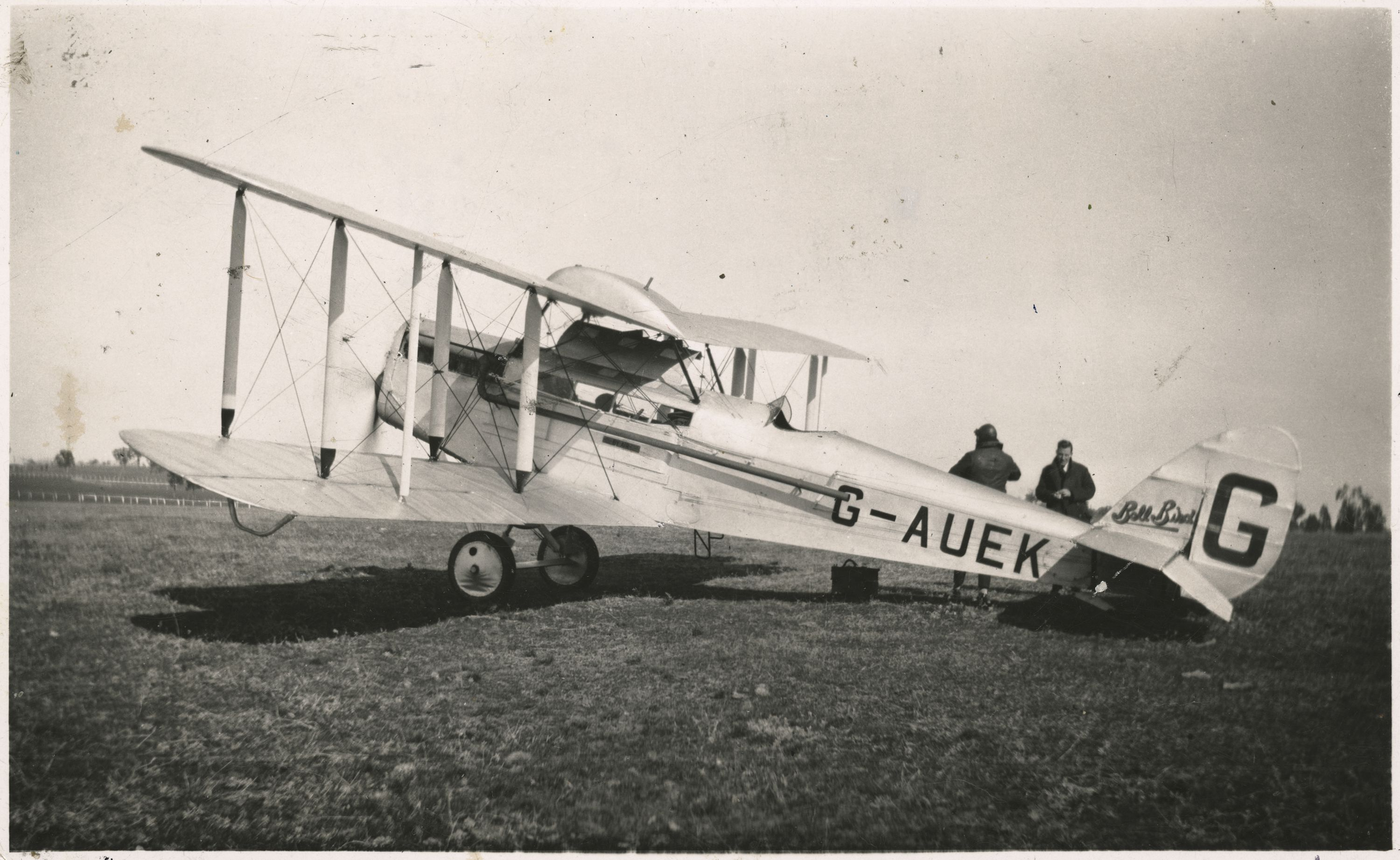
DH.50A Bell Bird (G-AUEK)

- DH.50A : Powered by one 240 hp (179 kW) Siddeley Puma inline engine.
- DH.50J : The Australian-built Qantas fleet were powered by one 450 hp (287 kW) Bristol Jupiter Mk IV radial engine. Other radial engines were fitted in other aircraft in the DH50J series.

== Operators ==
Australia

- Australian Aerial Services Ltd
- Holdens Air Transport

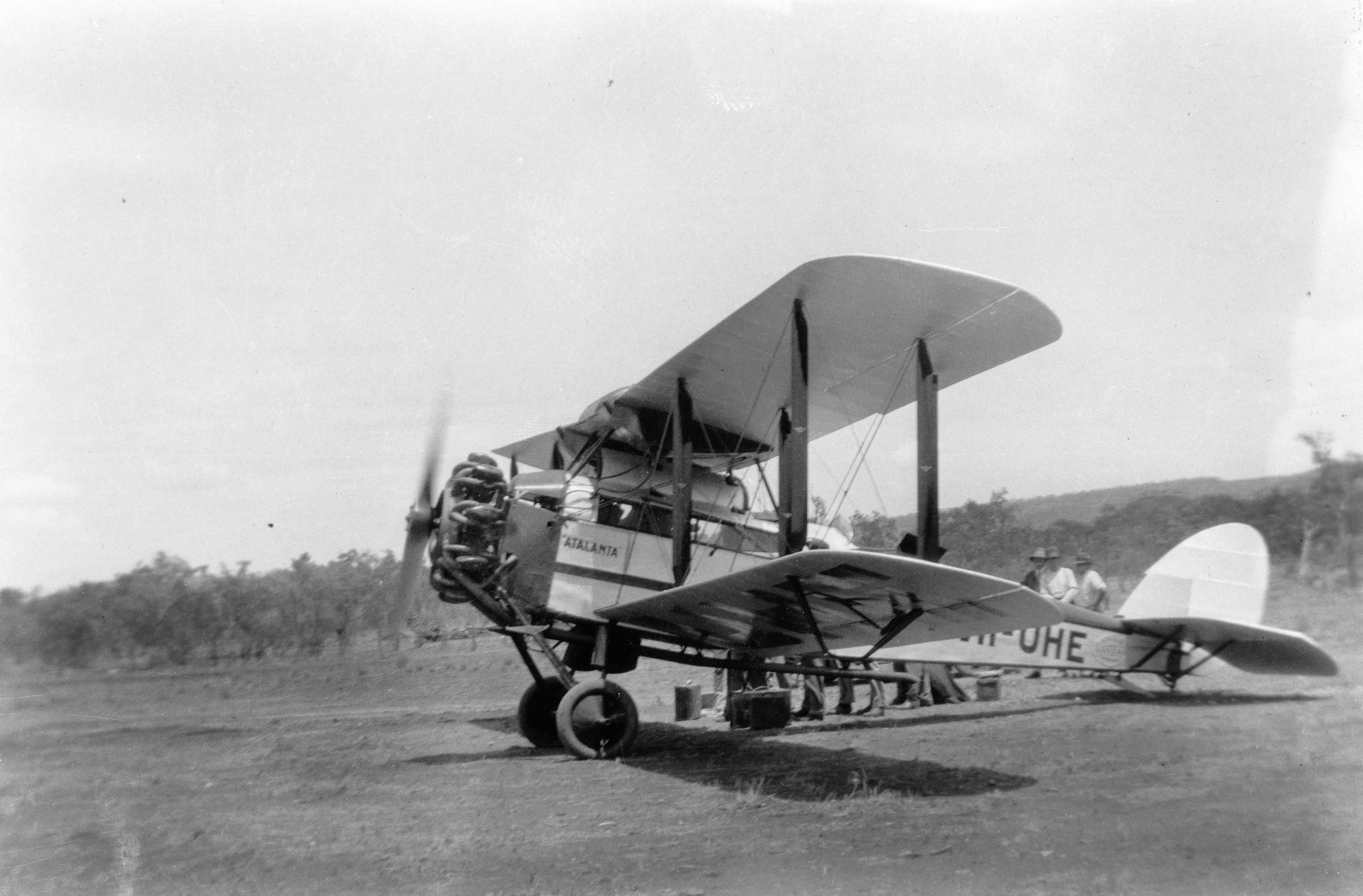
Qantas DH.50J Atalanta (VH-UHE)

- Qantas
- Rockhampton Aerial Services Ltd
- Royal Australian Air Force
- West Australian Airlines Ltd

Belgium

- Sabena

Czechoslovakia

- ČSA

Iraq

- Iraq Petroleum Transport Company Ltd

New Zealand

- Royal New Zealand Air Force

United Kingdom

- Air Taxis Ltd
- Brooklands School of Flying Ltd
- Imperial Airways Ltd
- North Sea Aerial and General Transport Company Ltd
- Northern Air Lines Ltd

== Specifications (DH.50 with Puma engine) ==
Data from De Havilland Aircraft since 1909

General characteristics

- Crew: 1
- Capacity: 4 passengers
- Length: 29 ft 9 in (9.07 m)
- Wingspan: 42 ft 9 in (13.03 m)
- Height: 11 ft 0 in (3.35 m)
- Wing area: 434 sq ft (40.3 m^{2})
- Empty weight: 2,413 lb (1,095 kg)
- Gross weight: 4,200 lb (1,905 kg)
- Powerplant: 1 × Siddeley Puma 6-cylinder water-cooled in-line piston engine, 230 hp (170 kW)
- Propellers: 2-bladed fixed-pitch propeller

Performance

- Maximum speed: 109 mph (175 km/h, 95 kn)
- Cruise speed: 95 mph (153 km/h, 83 kn)
- Range: 380 mi (610 km, 330 nmi)
- Service ceiling: 14,600 ft (4,500 m)
- Rate of climb: 605 ft/min (3.07 m/s)
- Wing loading: 8.99 lb/sq ft (43.9 kg/m^{2})
- Power/mass: 0.059 hp/lb (0.097 kW/kg)

== See also ==
Related lists

- List of aircraft of the Royal Australian Air Force
- List of aircraft of the Royal New Zealand Air Force and Royal New Zealand Navy
