= Swanson Dock =

Shipping facility in Melbourne, Victoria

Coordinates: 37°48′56″S 144°55′25″E

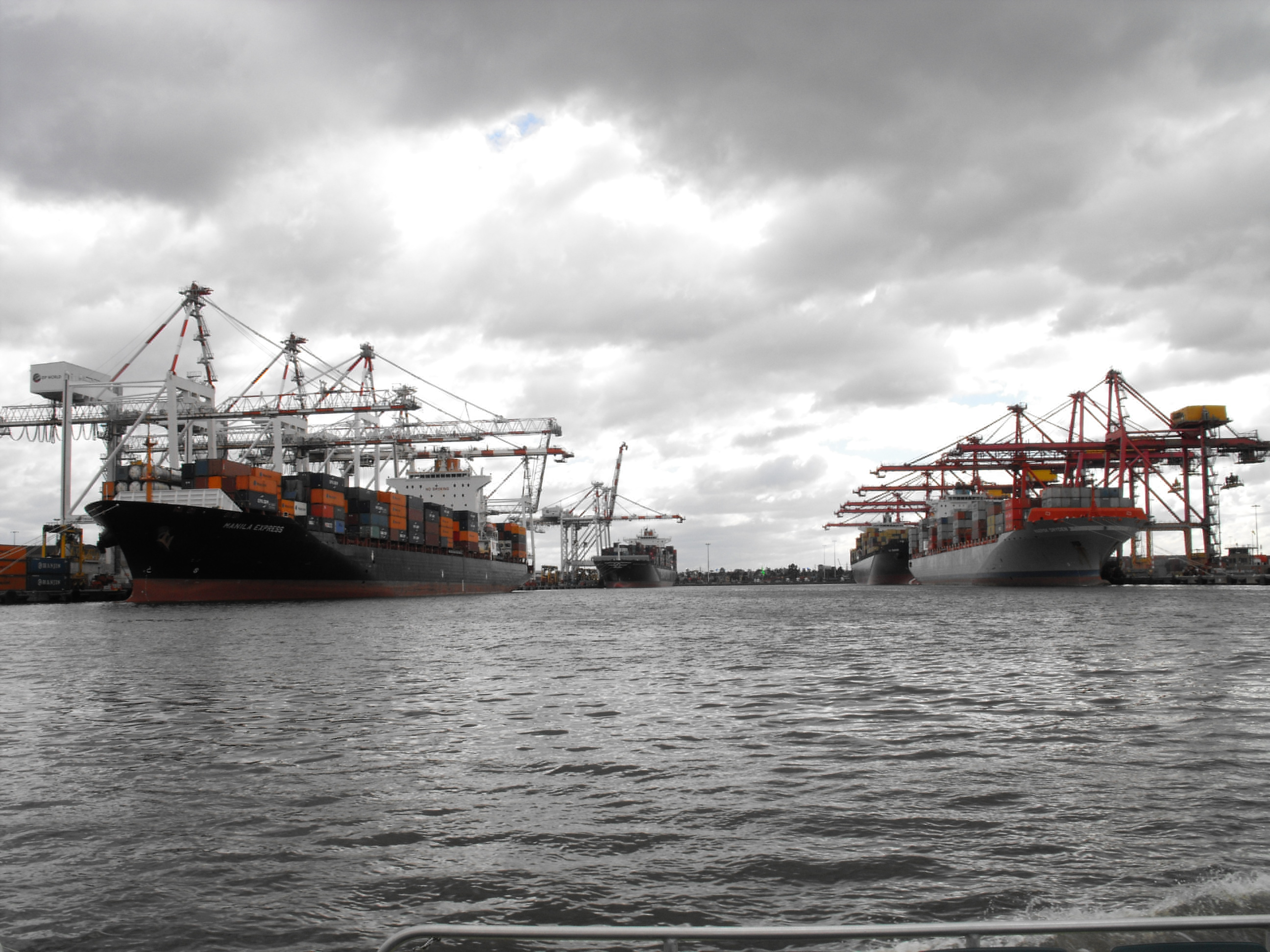
Four container ships berthed at the Swanson Dock in Melbourne, in 2013

Swanson Dock is an international shipping facility in Melbourne, Victoria, Australia. It was constructed between 1966 and 1972 by the Melbourne Harbor Trust, leading off the north bank of the Yarra River, to alleviate congestion in the port and provide Melbourne's first container shipping terminal. It is located about 2 km downstream from the Melbourne CBD and was named after Victor Swanson, chairman of the Melbourne Harbor Trust from 1960 to 1972.

== History ==
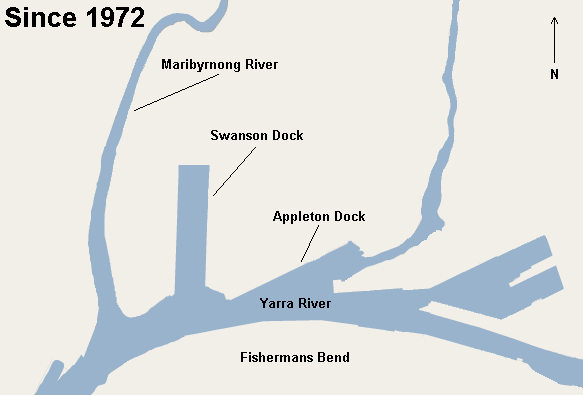
Melbourne docks showing extent of Swanson Dock in 1972

The construction of Spencer Street bridge over the Yarra River in 1929 reduced the capacity of the riverside wharves, and led to expansion downstream of port facilities initially with Appleton Dock. Swanson Dock was constructed in 1968 on the former Coode Island as Melbourne's first all-container shipping terminal, reflecting the rapid world-wide change at the beginning of the 1960s, from unit cargo where each product was loaded in different forms of packaging, to shipping cargo in uniform sized containers.

Swanson Dock was officially opened on 7 March 1969, by the Governor of Victoria, Sir Rohan Delacombe, during the 6th biennial conference of the International Association of Ports and Harbors, Melbourne Harbor Trust hosted. The first international ship to dock (at No 1 West Berth) was the Encounter Bay.

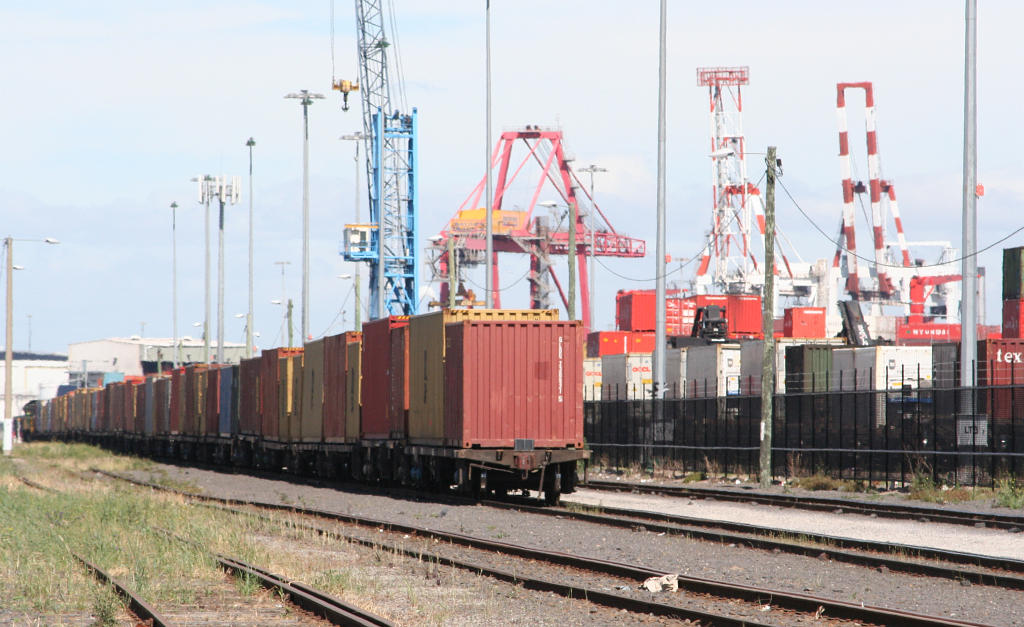
Train loaded with containers at Swanson Dock East

== Operation ==
Swanson Dock East has a berth length of 884 metres (2,900 ft) serviced by six container cranes with 40 hectares (99 acres) of container storage and roadways and rail siding. Swanson Dock West has 944 metres (3,097 ft) of wharves with seven container cranes and 34 hectares (84 acres) of space, potentially expanding as trade grows. Swanson Dock East and West can accommodate the largest container ships trading with Australia. Railway goods sidings serve both Swanson Dock East and West, permitting the transfer of shipping containers between sea and rail transport. Originally provided in the 1960s with the development of the port, they were later removed. Rail facilities were restored between 2002 and 2003 with a new 1500 metre long siding and overpasses to separate road traffic.

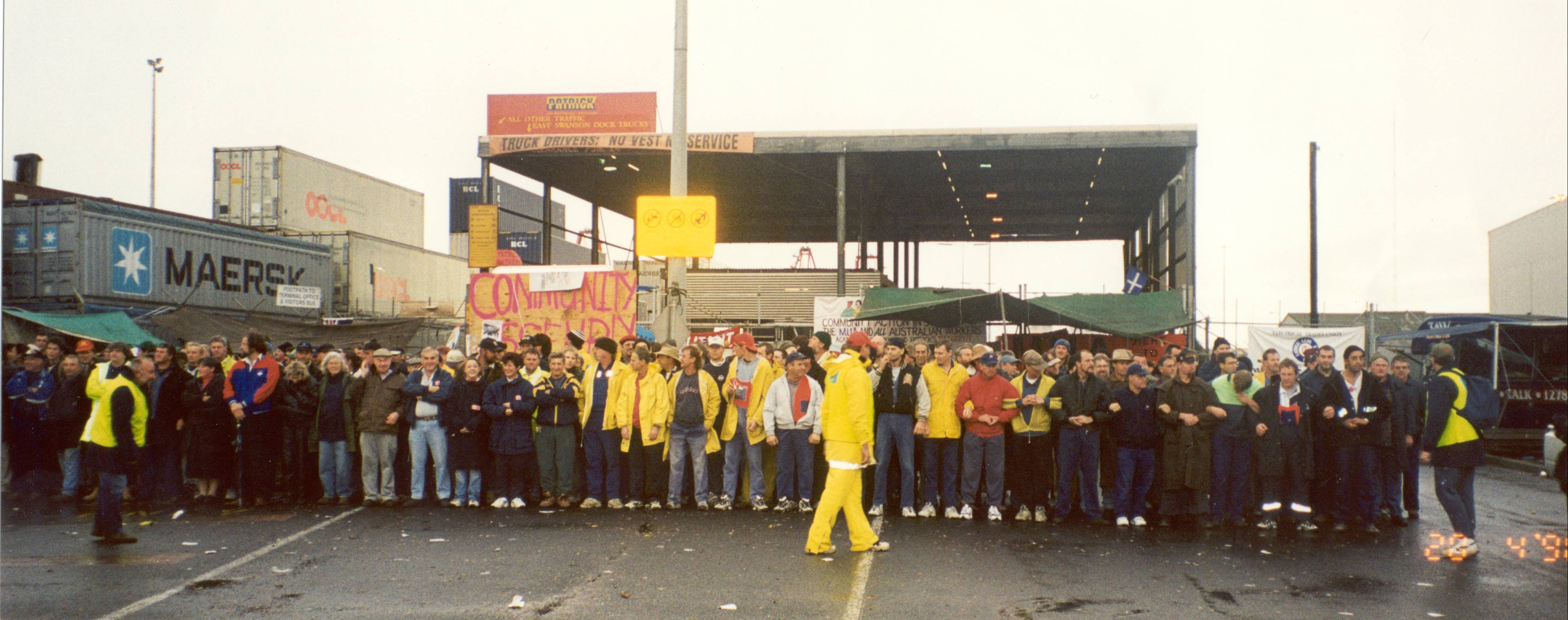
Picket line at Swanson Dock, Melbourne

Swanson Dock was one side of the 1998 Australian waterfront dispute when dockworkers were locked out by Patrick Stevedores, and replaced with non-union labour. The Maritime Union of Australia workers picketing East Swanson dock invited Wendy Lowenstein to record them "making history", which was incorporated into a second edition of her book Under the Hook.

== See also ==
- Port of Melbourne
- History of Melbourne Docklands
