= Lasco Lascoter =

Lascoter

General information
- Type: monoplane airliner
- Manufacturer: Larkin Aircraft Supply Company
- Designer: W. S. Shackleton
- Primary users: Australian Aerial Services New England Airways
- Number built: 1

History
- Introduction date: 1929
- First flight: 25 May 1929
- Retired: 1938

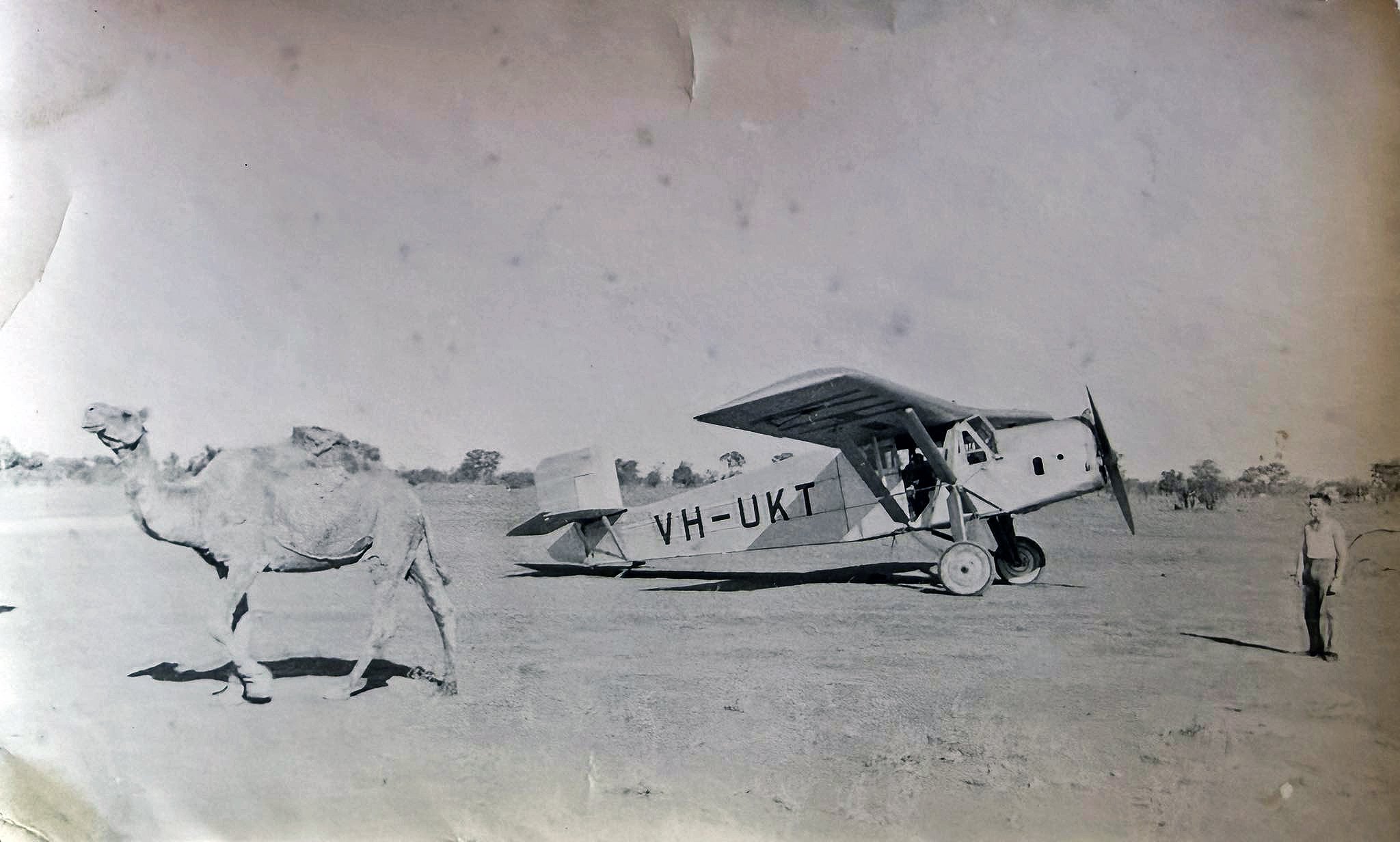
The sole Larkin Lascoter, seen here at Bourke aerodrome, New South Wales, was first registered in May 1929 to the Larkin Aircraft Supply Co. Later sold to Airlines of Australia Ltd., its registration had lapsed by 1938.

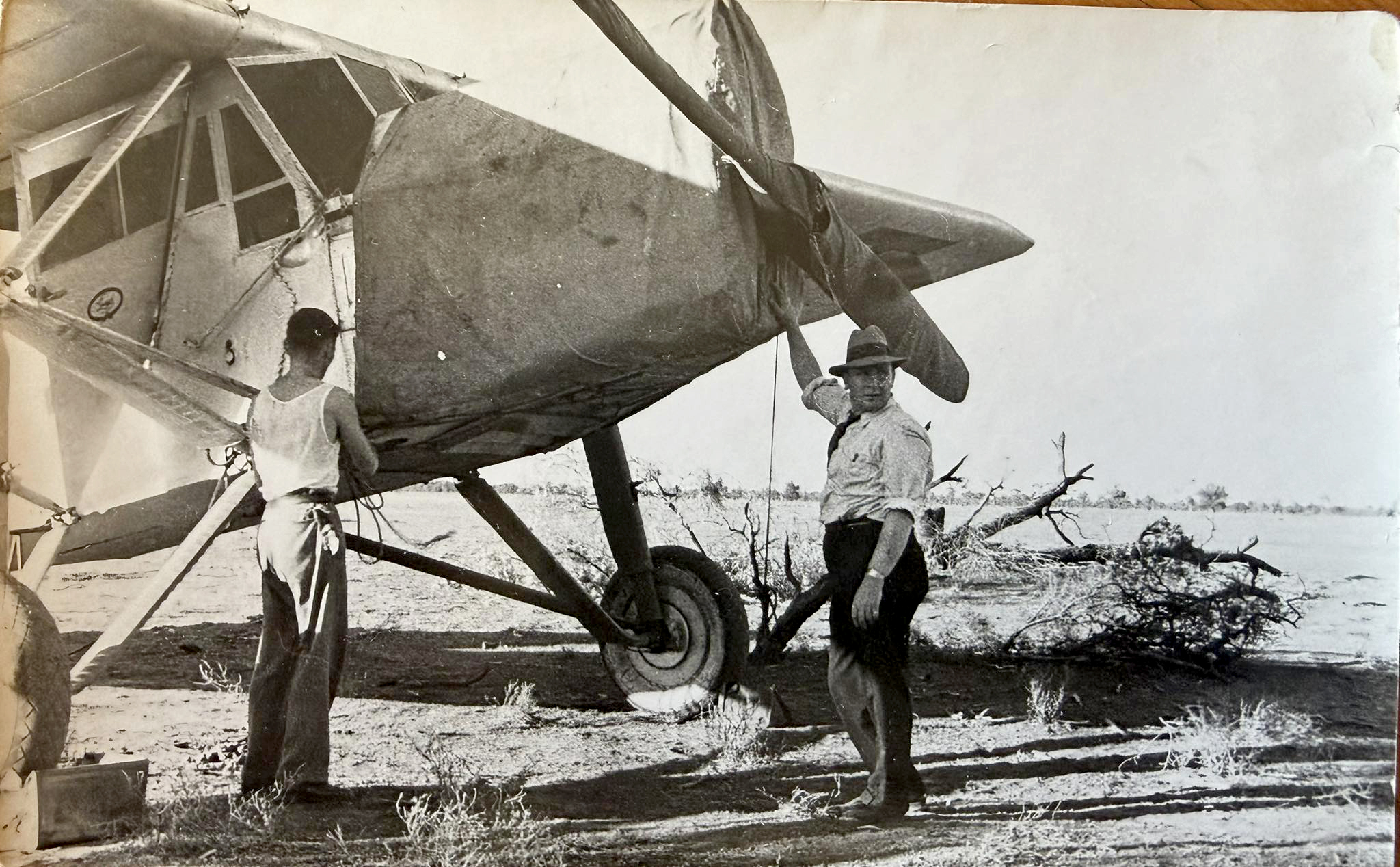
Larkin Lascoter VH-UKT photograhed by aerodrome manager Matthew (Jack) Nugent at Bourke aerodrome, New South Wales, n.d.

The Lasco Lascoter was a 1920s Australian 6-seat passenger and mail carrier aircraft built by the Larkin Aircraft Supply Company (Lasco) at Coode Island, Victoria. It was the first Australian-designed and built airliner to be granted a Certificate of Airworthiness.

== History ==
The Lascoter was a high-wing monoplane with a tubular steel structure, featuring a tailwheel undercarriage and a fully enclosed cabin for the passengers and the pilot. It flew for the first time on 25 May 1929; despite being damaged in a landing accident at Coode Island in May, it received its Certificate of Airworthiness on 22 July 1929. It was then put into service with Australian Aerial Services, an airline owned by Lasco, and used on an air mail route between Camooweal, Queensland and Daly Waters, Northern Territory. The Lascoter was used by Australian Aerial Services and its successors until being withdrawn from use in 1938; it was scrapped during World War II.

== Operators ==
- Australian Aerial Services
- New England Airways

== Specifications ==
General characteristics

- Crew: one
- Capacity: five passengers
- Empty weight: 2,500 lb (1,134 kg)
- Max takeoff weight: 4,500 lb (2,042 kg)
- Powerplant: 1 × Armstrong Siddeley Puma piston engine, 240 hp (179 kW)

Performance

- Maximum speed: 112 mph (180 km/h, 97 kn)
- Stall speed: 45 mph (72 km/h, 39 kn)
