= West Melbourne, Victoria =

West Melbourne
- Suburb
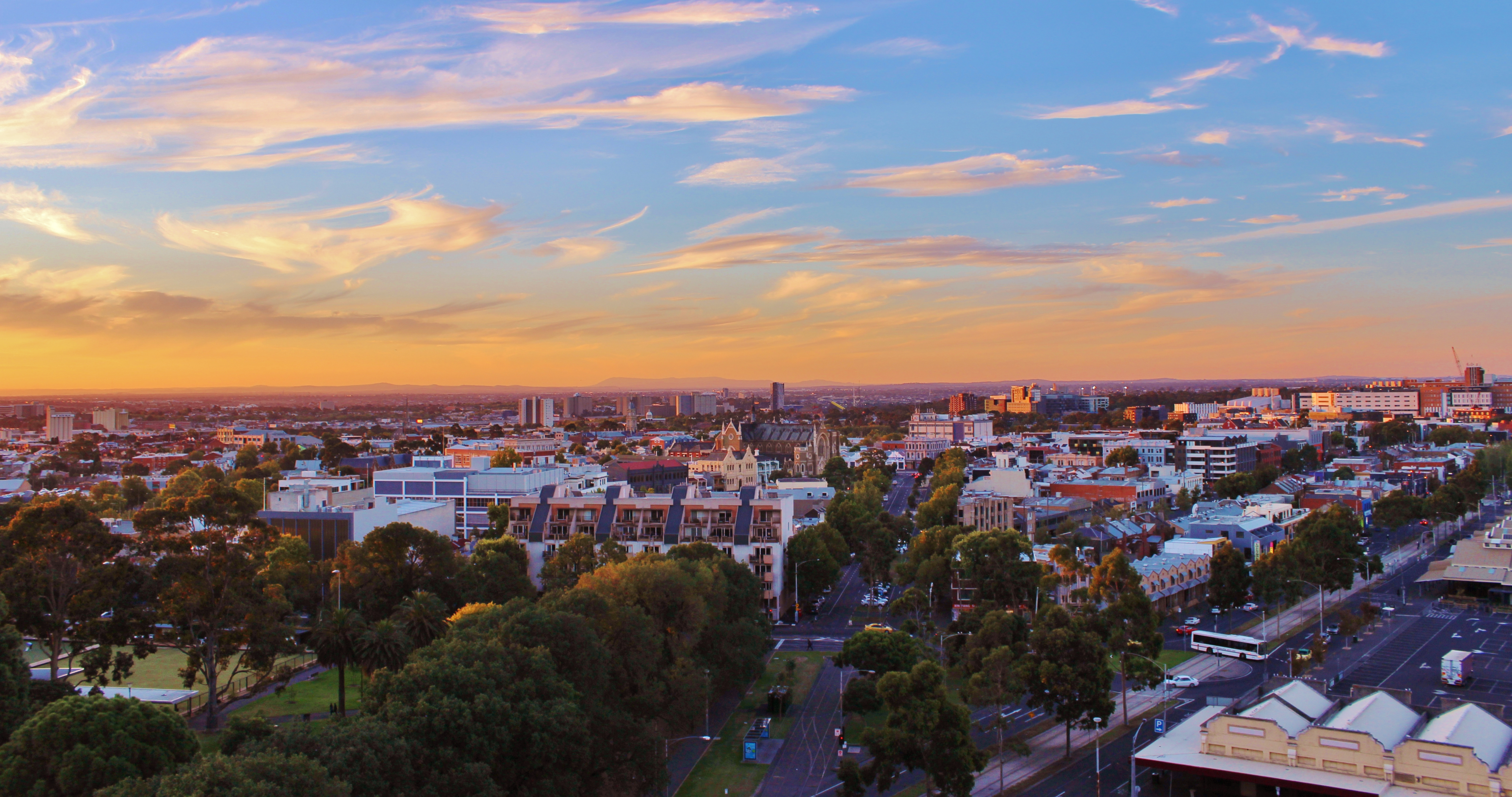
- West Melbourne - Flagstaff Gardens bottom left corner - 2013

- Interactive map of West Melbourne
- Coordinates: 37.808°S 144.927°E
- Country: Australia
- State: Victoria
- City: Melbourne
- LGA: City of Melbourne
- Location: 2 km (1.2 mi) from Melbourne

Government
  - State electorate: Melbourne
  - Federal division: Melbourne

Area
  - Total: 6.4 km^{2} (2.5 sq mi)
- Elevation: 5 m (16 ft)

Population
  - Total: 8,025 (2021 census)
  - Density: 1,254/km^{2} (3,248/sq mi)
- Postcode: 3003
Suburbs around West Melbourne
Footscray	Kensington	North Melbourne
Yarraville	West Melbourne	Melbourne CBD
Yarraville	Port Melbourne	Docklands

West Melbourne is an inner-city suburb in Melbourne, Victoria, Australia, 2 km (1.2 mi) north-west of the Melbourne central business district, located within the City of Melbourne local government area. West Melbourne recorded a population of 8,025 at the 2021 census.

The locality includes two distinct parts: the densely developed residential /industrial area located on the northwest edge of the CBD, and a much larger western section dominated by rail yards and port facilities. The former area is most closely associated with the West Melbourne name, and is bounded by La Trobe Street to the south, with Peel Street and the Flagstaff Gardens helping to form the eastern boundary, by Victoria Street to the north, and by the Sunbury/Werribee railway lines to the west. Beyond the rail lines the larger port and rail area is bounded by the Yarra River to the south, a short boundary following the Moonee Ponds Creek to the east, then the sweep of the rail lines, to the Maribyrnong River which forms the west boundary. This larger area includes the locality of Coode Island.

== History ==
Most of the streets in the residential/industrial area between the CBD and Victoria Street were subdivided by 1855. Adderley Street, and the extensions of Spencer Street and King Street followed a slight curve, while the remainder was a mix of alignment with the CBD grid, or the north south grid of the rest of the city.

The area closest to North Melbourne, south of Victoria Street, developed more or less contiguously with it, as mainly residential and shops lining Victoria Street..

West Melbourne Post Office opened on 1 March 1937 and was replaced by the Queen Vic Market Newsagency office in 1990, which closed in 1996.

The areas closest to the CBD, and close to the rail lines and port, were more favoured for industrial development, which continued into the mid 20th Century. A major landmark is the five storey red brick premises built for Sands & McDougal on the corner of Spencer and Jeffcott Streets in 1885.

Rail lines to the north and west of the state headed north-west from the terminus on Spencer Street were first established in 1857, and the number of lines increased over the years. The area to the west of the lines was originally the West Melbourne Swamp and the original looping course of the Yarra River. The area remained low and swampy and largely undeveloped even after the Coode Canal was built in the 1890s, and eventually mainly housed port facilities and extensive railway yards. Dudley Street and Footscray Roads running east west provided the main access to the western suburbs from the rest of the city. During the 1930s depression, informal settlements along the Moonee Ponds Creek were known as the Dudley Flats.

In the 1990s, the Bolte Bridge and the CityLink toll road cut across the area from north to south.

== Population ==
In the 2016 census, there were 5,515 people in West Melbourne. 42.3% of people were born in Australia. The most common countries of birth were China 7.4%, India 4.9%, South Korea 4.5%, Malaysia 3.7% and New Zealand 2.6%. 45.4% of people only spoke English at home. Other languages spoken at home included Mandarin 10.0%, Korean 4.3%, Cantonese 3.5% and Spanish 2.0%. The most common response for religion was No Religion at 44.8%.

== Transport ==
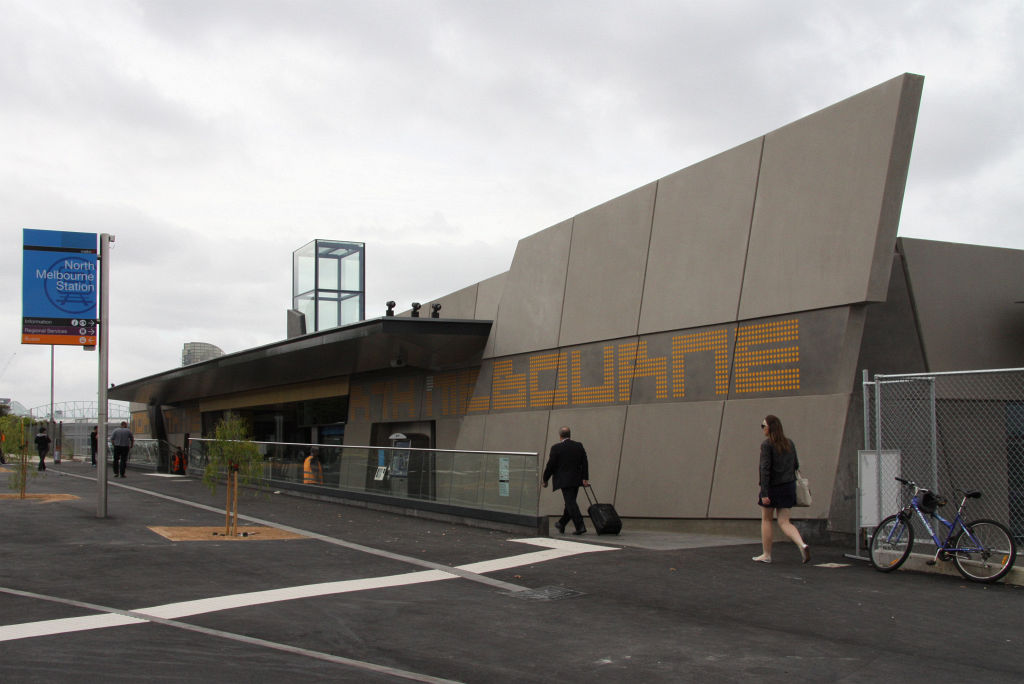
North Melbourne railway station

The North Melbourne railway station is actually located in West Melbourne, opposite the Railway Hotel on Ireland Street.

- 220 Sunshine - Gardenvale passes along Dudley Street operated by Kinetic Melbourne
- 401 North Melbourne – University of Melbourne via Royal Melbourne Hospital, University of Melbourne (Monday to Friday), operated by Transit Systems Victoria

A number of tram routes run along the periphery of the suburb, along Victoria Street:

- Route 30: St Vincent's Plaza – Docklands
- Route 57: West Maribyrnong – Flinders Street station
- Route 58: Toorak – West Coburg
- City Circle

== Culture ==
=== Churches ===
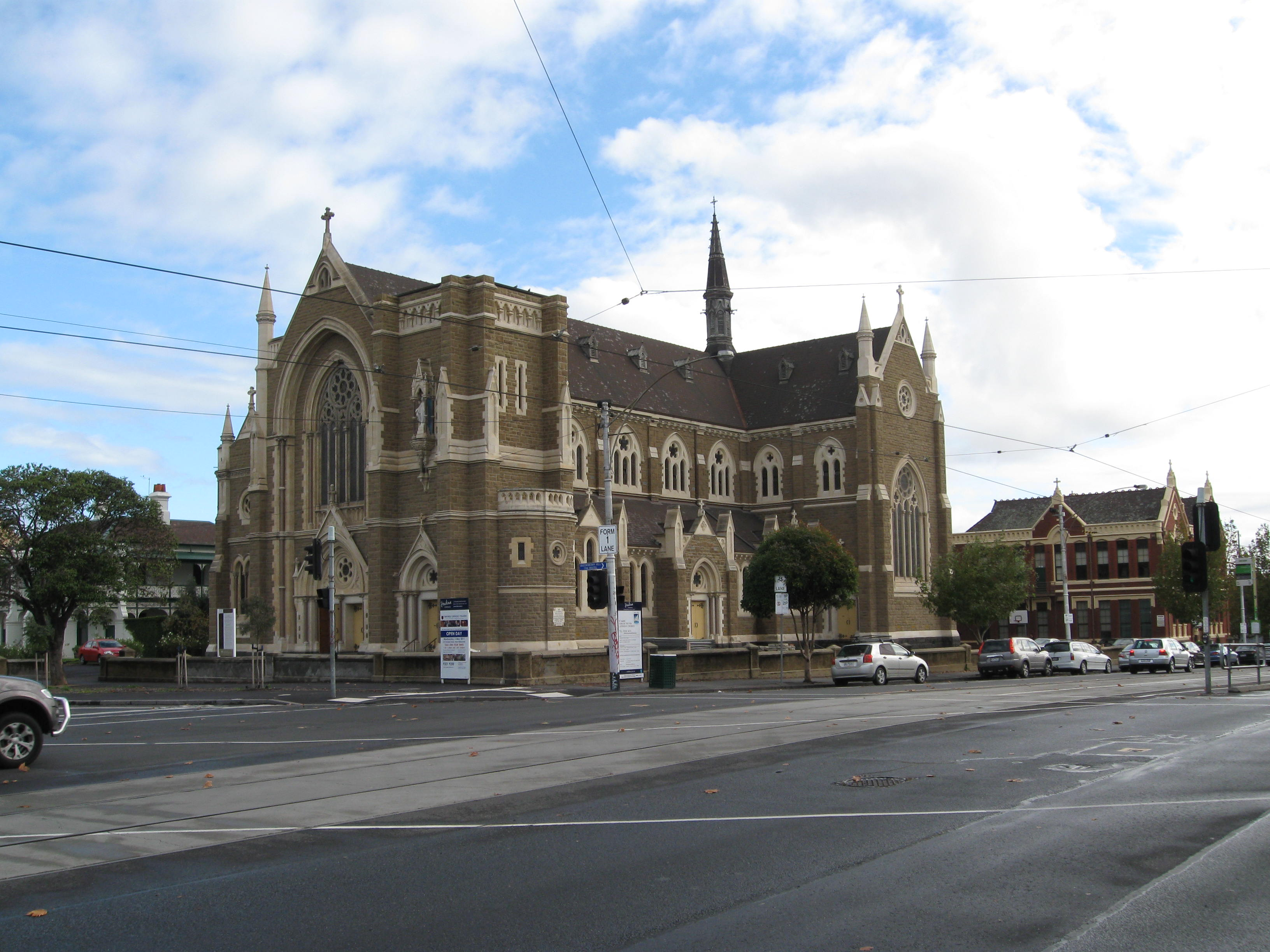
St Mary's Star of the Sea

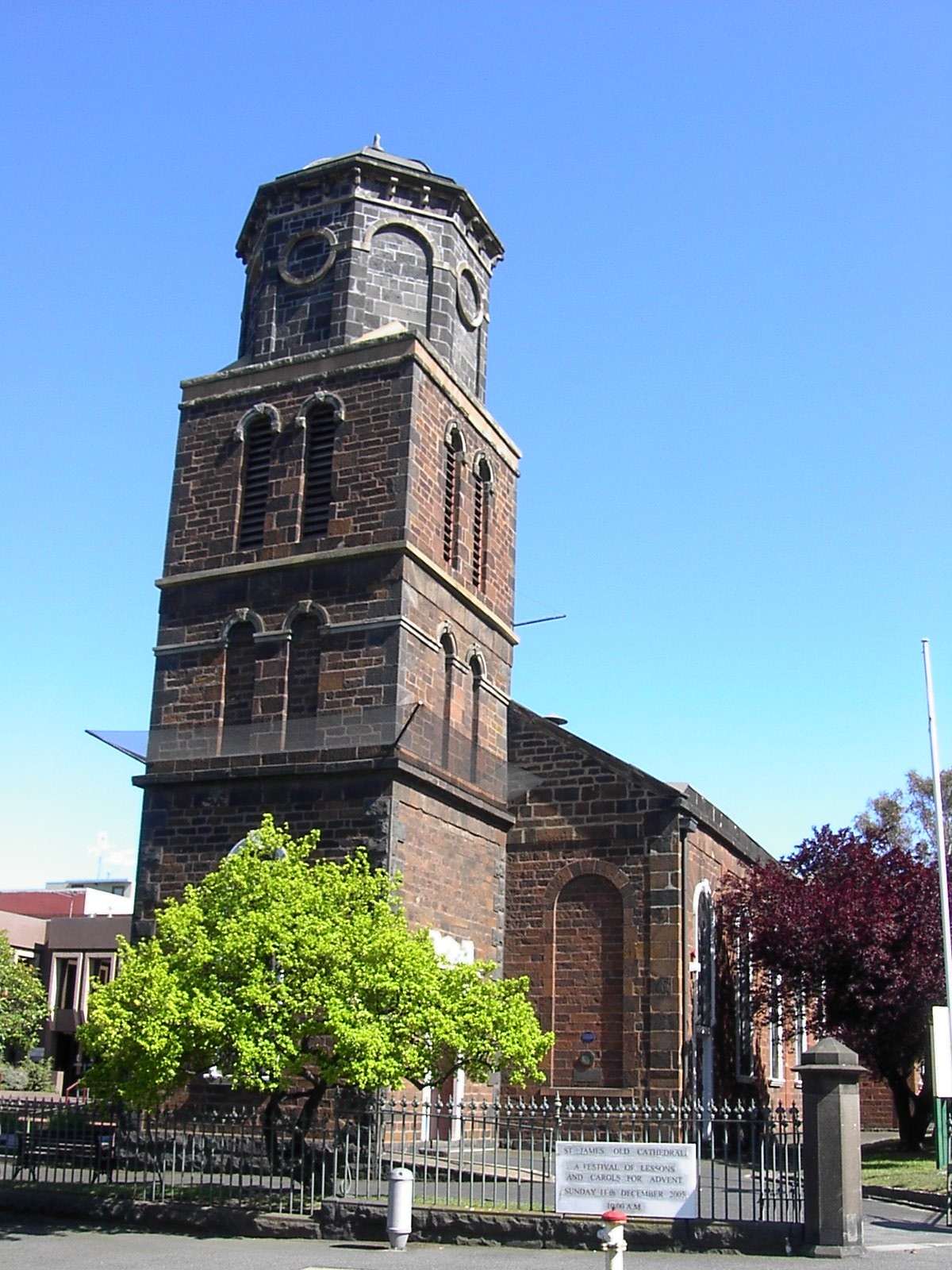
St James Old Cathedral

- West Melbourne Baptist
- St Mary Star of the Sea, West Melbourne Catholic
- St James Old Cathedral (Melbourne's oldest cathedral, built in 1842)
- St Mary's Anglican

=== Entertainment venue ===
- Festival Hall

=== Parks and gardens ===
- Flagstaff Gardens
- The Triangle Park (bounded by King Street, Chetwynd Street, Eades Place)
- The Pocket Park (bounded by William, Howard and Rosslyn Streets)

== Localities ==
=== Older West Melbourne ===
The area closest to Victoria Street and adjacent to the Queen Victoria Market consists of a mixture of Victorian single and double storey terrace houses, converted warehouses and mostly low rise modern development.

The area bounded by Railway Parade and Spencer Street has undergone significant change since 2000. Many older warehouses have been converted to apartments, and the industrial flavour of the area has diminished rapidly with the construction of numerous apartment developments, including many high rise.

=== Shopping ===
West Melbourne lays claim to the southern side of Victoria Street, meaning that a small range of restaurants and shops lie within its boundaries. Otherwise it has no shopping area of its own. However the Direct Factory Outlet development on Spencer Street in the CBD, and Errol Street, North Melbourne are just outside the boundary of West Melbourne.

==== Port and rail facilities ====
This larger portion of West Melbourne is home to the Swanson and Appleton Docks the Dynon Railway Yards.

The south western part of West Melbourne's industrial zone is known as Coode Island, named after engineer John Coode and retains the "Island" name, despite no longer being an island after the river was realigned. The western edge along the Maribyrnong is the site of Victoria's major petrochemical storage facility.

The strip of land along the north of Footscray Road was home to the Melbourne Markets from the 1950s to 2015. These included the Wholesale Fruit and Vegetable and Fish Markets, as well as the National Flower Centre. There area also industrial sites along the Maribyrnong.

== Gallery ==
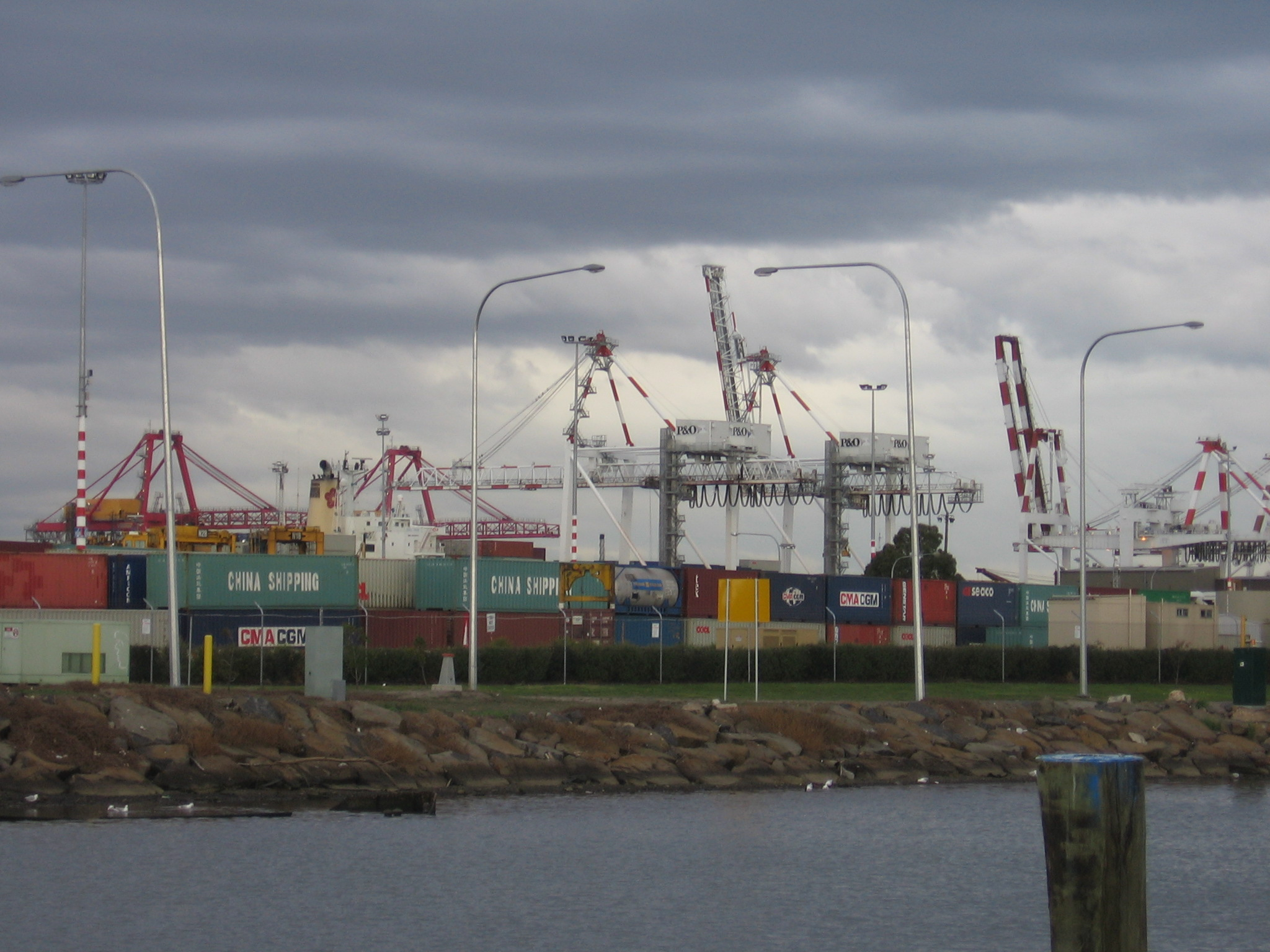
Coode Island viewed from the west

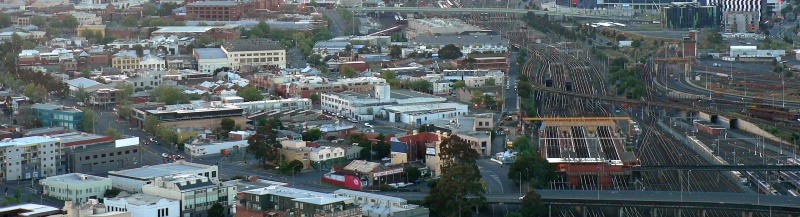
Aerial view of eastern commercial and residential section of West Melbourne looking south toward Melbourne CBD and Docklands. North Melbourne railway station and railyards are at right
