= John Coode (engineer) =

Sir John Coode KCMG
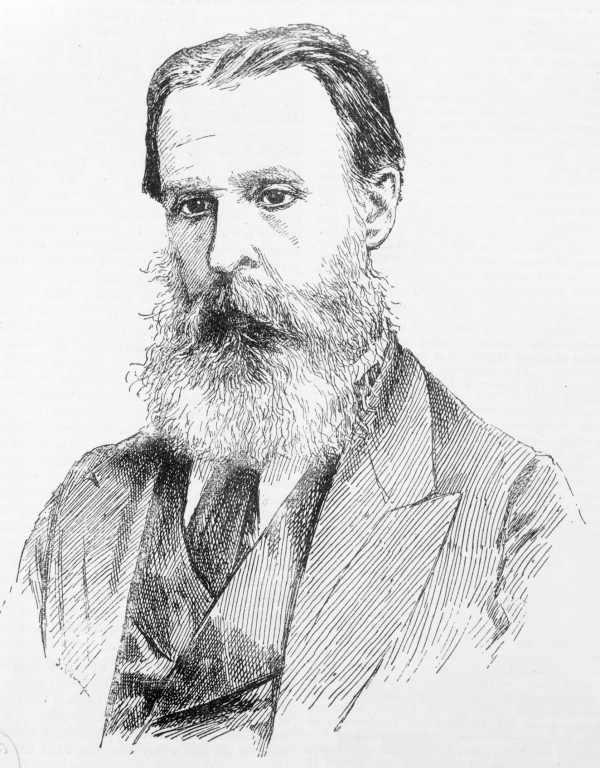
- A woodcut of John Coode made after his death
- Born: 11 November 1816; Bodmin, Cornwall
- Died: 2 March 1892 (aged 75); Brighton, East Sussex
- Engineering career
- Discipline: Civil,
- Institutions: Institution of Civil Engineers (president),
- Projects: Melbourne Port and River improvements,

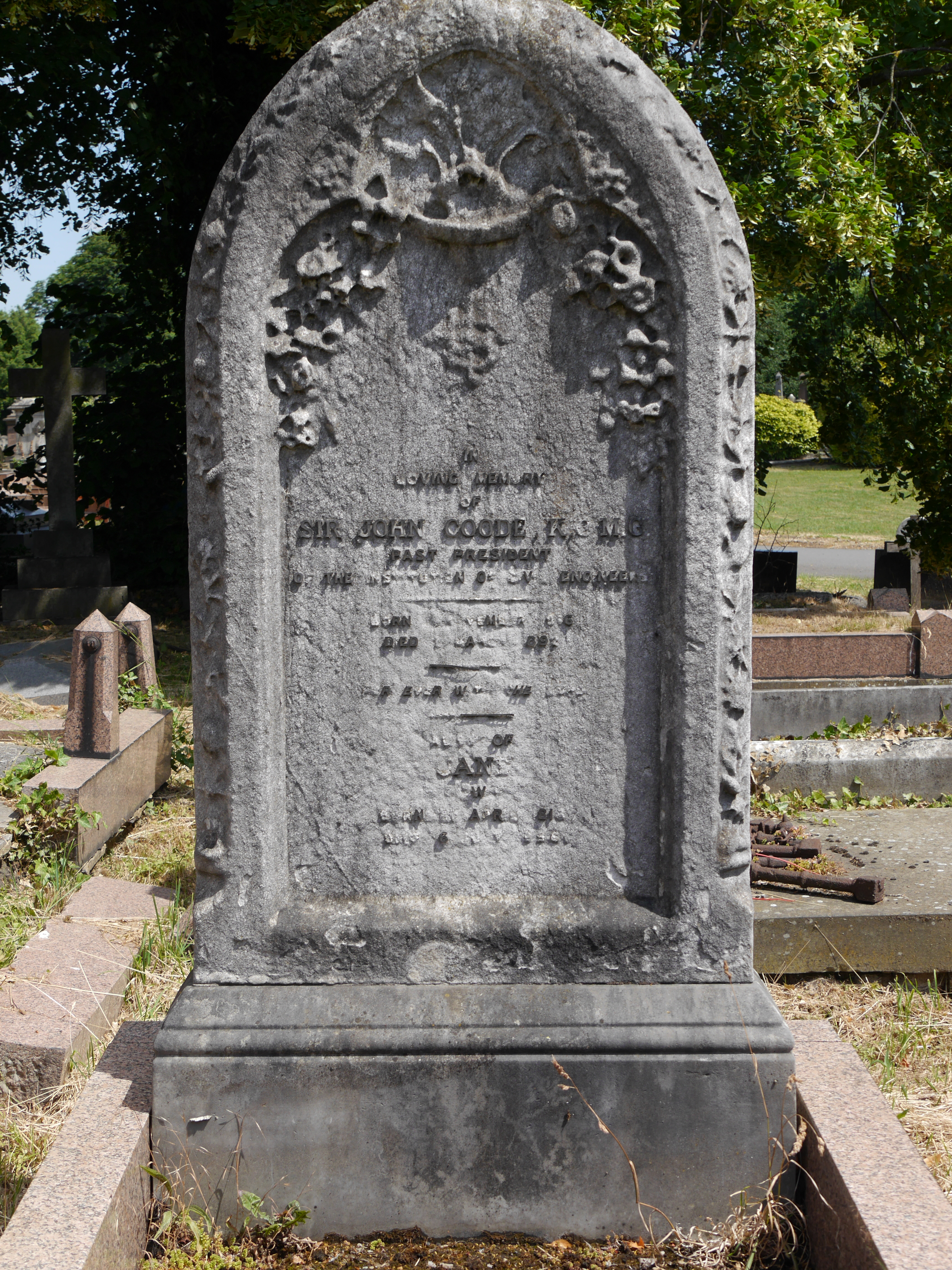
Monument, Kensal Green Cemetery

Sir John Coode (11 November 1816 – 2 March 1892) was an English civil engineer, known for harbour works.

== Life ==
He was born at Bodmin in 1816. He was educated at Bodmin Grammar School and after leaving school entered his father's office. His natural tastes, however, were not for law but for engineering; he was therefore articled to James Meadows Rendel of Plymouth, and on completion of his pupilage he worked for some years for that gentleman and on the Great Western Railway.

In 1844, he set up in business for himself in Westminster as a consulting engineer, and remained there until 1847. In that year he was appointed resident engineer in charge of the great works at Portland Harbour, which had been designed by Rendel. On the death of the latter in 1856, Coode was appointed engineer-in-chief, and retained that post until the completion of the work in 1872. This harbour provided the largest area of deep water of any artificial harbour in Great Britain, and was a work of the utmost national importance. The first stone of the great breakwater was laid by the prince consort on 25 July 1849, and the final stone was put in place by the prince of Wales in 1872, the work having therefore taken twenty-three years to complete and having cost about a million sterling. The honour of knighthood was conferred upon Coode in 1872 for his services in connection with this national undertaking.

While this work was going on Coode served as a member of the royal commission on harbours of refuge, and also drew out the plans for the harbour which was to be constructed in Table Bay, Cape Town, and for numerous other similar harbour works.

He designed the lighthouse at La Corbière in Jersey which was the first lighthouse in the British Isles to be built of reinforced concrete.

He was consulted by several of the most important colonial governments, notably by those of the South African and Australian colonies, in reference to proposed harbour works, and he made several journeys to South Africa, Australia, and India in connection with the schemes upon which his advice was sought. In 1876, he was in Cape Colony and in Natal, and again in 1877, and in 1878 and 1885 he paid visits to Australia and New Zealand.

After the Portland Harbour his best-known work is the harbour of Colombo, Ceylon (now Sri Lanka). He was also responsible for the straightening of the lower reaches of the Yarra River in Melbourne, Australia with the resulting district of Coode Island and the Coode Canal named for him, and the design of what became Victoria Dock.

He was a member of the royal commission on metropolitan sewage discharge (1882–4), and of the international commission of the Suez Canal; on the latter he served from 1884 until his death in 1892. After he returned from his second visit to the Australian colonies he was made a K.C.M.G. in 1886, in recognition of the distinguished services he had rendered to the empire.

Coode was probably the most distinguished harbour engineer of the nineteenth century; it would be difficult to estimate too highly the value to the trade and mutual intercourse of the different parts of the British empire, of the harbour and river improvement schemes in every part of the world for which he was responsible. He was elected a member of the Institution of Civil Engineers in 1849, served for many years on the council, and was president from May 1889 to May 1891. He was also an active member of the Royal Colonial Institute, and sat on its council from 1881 until his death.

Coode died at Brighton in 1892, aged 75. He is buried at Kensal Green Cemetery.

== Family ==
He married in 1842 Jane, daughter of William Price of Weston-super-Mare.

There is a portrait of him in oil at the Institution of Civil Engineers, and a bust, the property of Mrs. Lillingston, the Vicarage, Havering-atte-Bower, near Romford.

== Works ==
Coode contributed a very valuable paper to the Institution of Civil Engineers in 1852 on the 'Chesil Bank' (Proc. Inst. Civil Eng, xii. 520), and his presidential address to the civil engineers was delivered in 1889.

He wrote many professional reports, chiefly on harbours, the most important of which are Table Bay (Weymouth, 1859); Whitehaven (London, 1866); on military harbours (London, 1875); Table Bay, Mossel Bay, &c. (London, 1877); Port Natal (London, 1877); Melbourne (London, 1879); Report on Harbours and Rivers in Queensland, Mackay (London, 1887); Townsville (London, 1887); Report on River Tyne Improvements (London, 1877); Report on tidal difficulties on Dee at Chester (Chester, 1891).

Professional and academic associations
Preceded by George Barclay Bruce	President of the Institution of Civil Engineers; May 1889 – May 1891	Succeeded by George Berkley
