= Point Wilson, Victoria =

Point Wilson Victoria
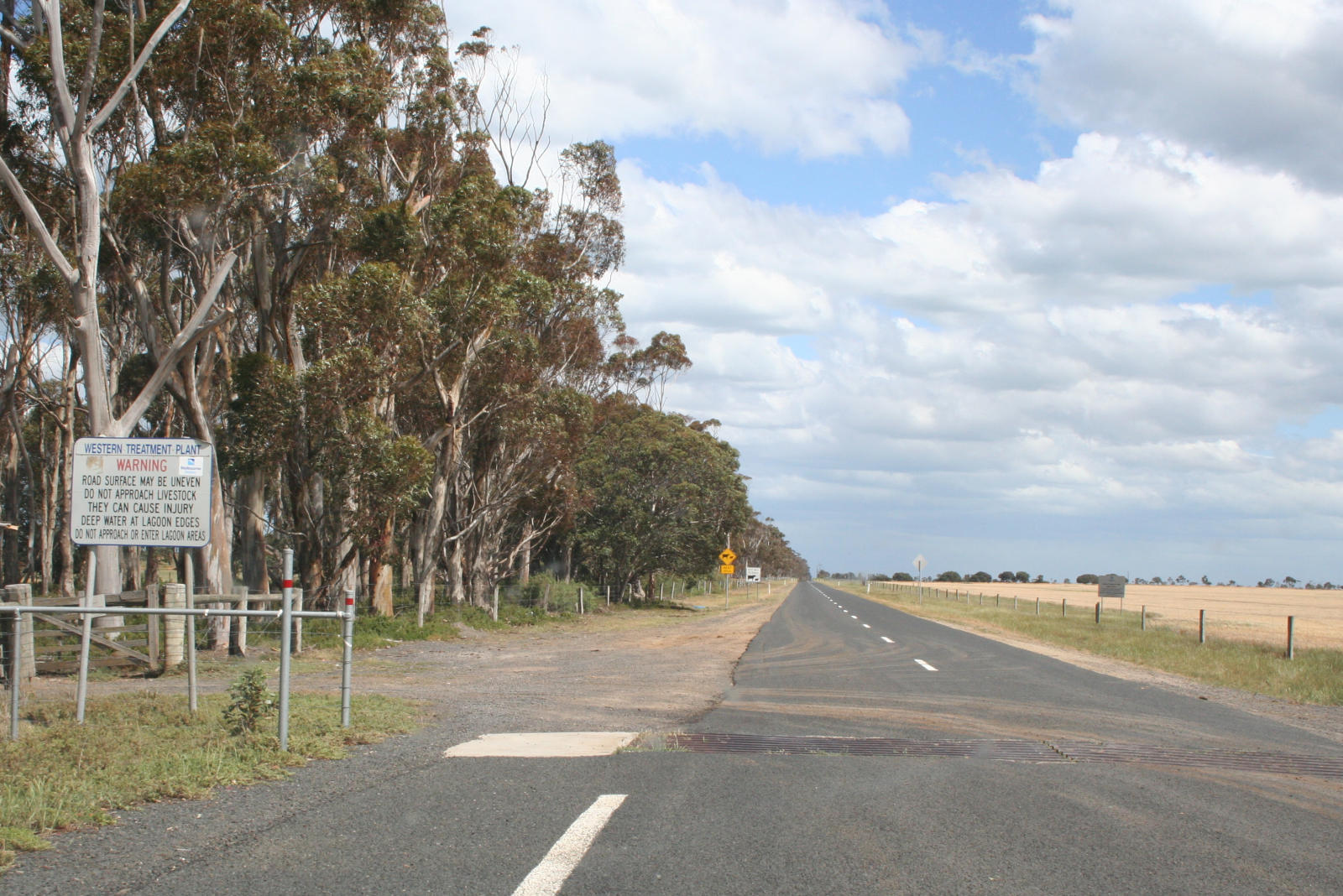
- Road towards Point Wilson

- Coordinates: 38°01′16″S 144°31′44″E
- Population: 0 (SAL 2016)
- Postcode(s): 3212
- Elevation: 95 m (312 ft)
- Location: 19 km (12 mi) from Geelong; 47 km (29 mi) from Melbourne
- LGA(s): City of Greater Geelong
Mean max temp	Mean min temp	Annual rainfall
18.2 °C; 65 °F	11.8 °C; 53 °F	?
Localities around Point Wilson:
Little River	Little River	Cocoroc
Avalon	Point Wilson	Port Phillip
Port Phillip	Port Phillip	Port Phillip

Point Wilson is a locality located on the northern shores of Corio Bay, Victoria. It is approximately 60 kilometres by road from Melbourne, and 25 kilometres by road from Geelong.

The locality is bounded by Pousties Road to the west, the Princes Freeway to the north west, Little River to the north east, and Corio Bay to the south. Point Wilson is sparsely populated, and public access to the area is restricted due to the explosives facility located in the area. Other nearby land uses include the Murtcaim Wildlife Area and Melbourne Water's Western Treatment Plant.

== Environment ==
The Point Wilson area is environmentally sensitive. It forms part of the Port Phillip Bay (Western Shoreline) and Bellarine Peninsula Ramsar Site as a wetland of international importance. It contains important habitat for the critically endangered orange-bellied parrot that uses the coastal salt marsh as a wintering site. The site is part of the Werribee and Avalon Important Bird Area, identified as such by BirdLife International because of its importance for wetland and waterbirds as well as orange-bellied parrots.

The area surrounding the jetty consists of salt marshes, a low basalt bluff, and shelly ridges. The environment is considered in good condition due to the lack of human disturbance.

== Explosives ==
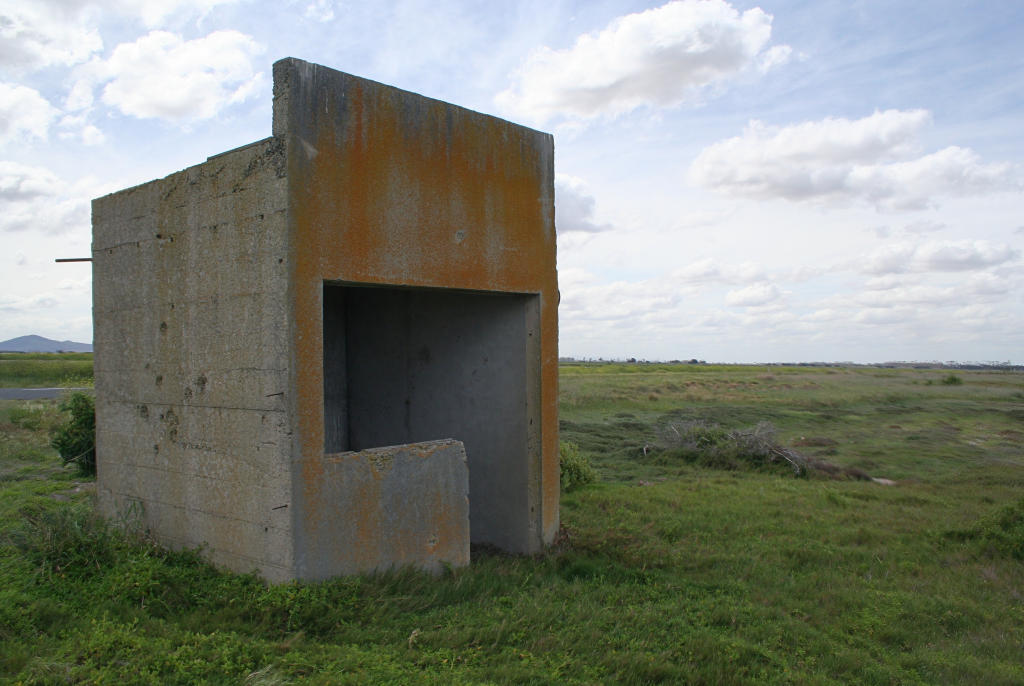
Disused bunker near the shoreline of Corio Bay

Point Wilson has been used as an explosives magazine since 1962, when the facility was relocated from the Altona explosives storage near Laverton. Owned by the Commonwealth of Australia, the Point Wilson Explosives Area is 326 hectares in size.

A 2,700 metre long steel and concrete jetty and wharf structure was constructed in the late 1950s for the importation of explosives. Four explosives storage and handling buildings were constructed in 1981. Commercial ships are used to transport ordnance and explosives from Europe and the United States to Australia, where they are offloaded at facilities including Point Wilson.

1994 saw the East Coast Armaments Complex proposal made by the Commonwealth of Australia, which involved the upgrade of the facility to handle the loading of explosives to naval ships. The proposal was deferred, although the facility continues to handle the import of explosives for the defence forces.

== Chemicals ==
ICI proposed a chloralkali-based petrochemical complex for Point Wilson in the 1970s. This proposal did not succeed.

The Victorian State Government in 1994 proposed that the Coode Island bulk liquid chemical storage facility be relocated to the adjacent Point Lillias. The proposal was dropped in June 1997.

== Climate ==
Point Wilson possesses an oceanic climate (Köppen: Cfb), with tepid summers and mild winters. Average maxima vary from 23.3 °C (73.9 °F) in January to 12.9 °C (55.2 °F) in July while average minima fluctuate between 16.4 °C (61.5 °F) in January and 7.7 °C (45.9 °F) in July. Extreme temperatures have ranged from 40.7 °C (105.3 °F) on 25 January 2003 to −1.1 °C (30.0 °F) on 26 February 1994.

Climate data for Point Wilson (38.10°S 144.54°E, 18 m AMSL) (1990-2008 normals & extremes)
Month	Jan	Feb	Mar	Apr	May	Jun	Jul	Aug	Sep	Oct	Nov	Dec	Year
Record high °C (°F)	40.7 (105.3)	39.3 (102.7)	37.5 (99.5)	32.4 (90.3)	25.4 (77.7)	21.3 (70.3)	20.3 (68.5)	23.9 (75.0)	27.7 (81.9)	34.9 (94.8)	40.3 (104.5)	40.3 (104.5)	40.7 (105.3)
Mean daily maximum °C (°F)	23.3 (73.9)	23.2 (73.8)	21.6 (70.9)	18.6 (65.5)	16.0 (60.8)	13.8 (56.8)	12.9 (55.2)	13.9 (57.0)	15.9 (60.6)	17.5 (63.5)	19.4 (66.9)	21.7 (71.1)	18.2 (64.7)
Mean daily minimum °C (°F)	16.4 (61.5)	15.9 (60.6)	14.8 (58.6)	12.4 (54.3)	10.5 (50.9)	8.9 (48.0)	7.7 (45.9)	8.0 (46.4)	9.3 (48.7)	10.6 (51.1)	12.7 (54.9)	14.4 (57.9)	11.8 (53.2)
Record low °C (°F)	8.8 (47.8)	−1.1 (30.0)	7.9 (46.2)	6.2 (43.2)	3.8 (38.8)	2.5 (36.5)	2.6 (36.7)	3.6 (38.5)	3.9 (39.0)	3.5 (38.3)	4.9 (40.8)	6.6 (43.9)	−1.1 (30.0)
Average afternoon relative humidity (%)	61	62	61	65	69	72	71	67	63	60	61	57	64
Average dew point °C (°F)	12.5 (54.5)	13.1 (55.6)	11.8 (53.2)	10.1 (50.2)	9.1 (48.4)	7.7 (45.9)	6.9 (44.4)	6.7 (44.1)	7.0 (44.6)	7.7 (45.9)	9.8 (49.6)	10.4 (50.7)	9.4 (48.9)
Source: Bureau of Meteorology (1990-2008 normals & extremes)

Point Wilson is the location of a Bureau of Meteorology weather station that opened in 1990.

== Culture ==
Some of the shooting locations featured in the film Mad Max are on Point Wilson Road.
