= Limeburners Bay =

Bight in Victoria, Australia

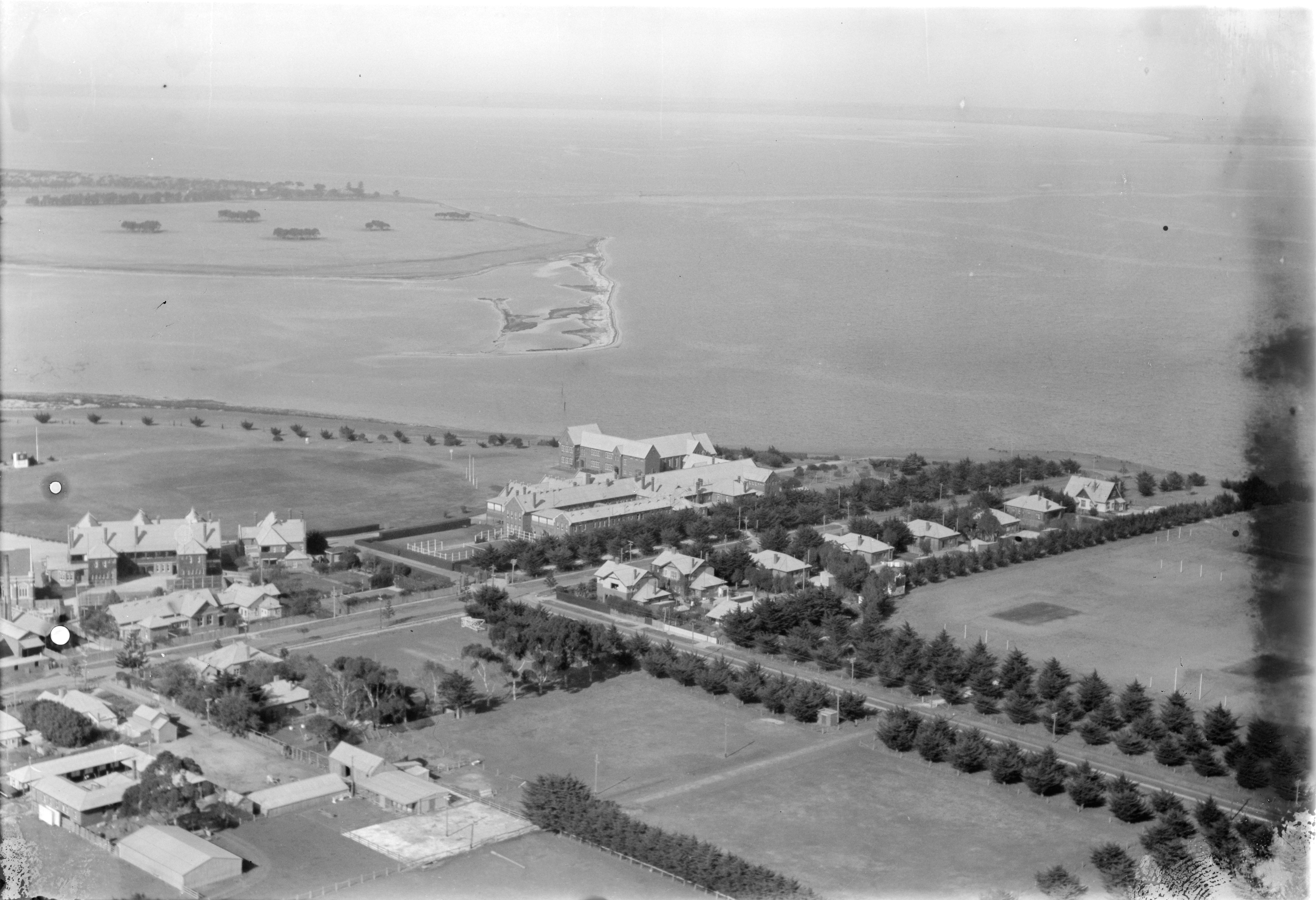
- The entrance of Limeburners Bay, with Geelong Grammar School in the foreground (1939).

- Location within City of Greater Geelong

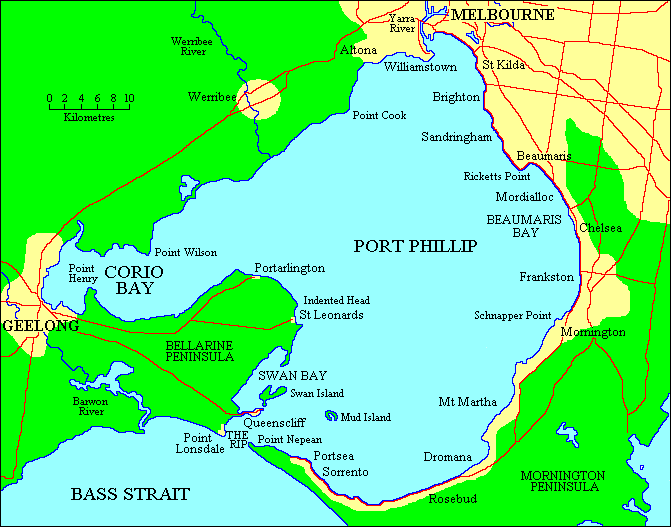
- Map of Port Phillip showing location of Corio Bay. Limeburners Bay is the small inlet at the northernmost tip of Corio Bay.
- Location: Victoria
- Coordinates: 38.075°S 144.407°E
- Primary outflows: Corio Bay; Port Phillip
- Basin countries: Australia
- Frozen: never
- Settlements: Geelong

Limeburners Bay, one of numerous bays in Port Phillip, lies in the southwest and adjoins Corio Bay, which abuts Geelong, the second largest city in Victoria, Australia. The bay was named after lime kilns, located on the east side of Corio Bay, used to burn limestone for making cement.

In the 1820s, explorers Hume and Hovell ended their journey in the area of Limeburners Bay before returning to Sydney. It is a tide-dominated estuary at the mouth of Hovells Creek. The area is popular for recreational fishing and hiking and birdwatching. Geelong Grammar School overlooks the bay.

Limeburners Bay is home to many endangered species. It forms part of the Port Phillip Bay (Western Shoreline) and Bellarine Peninsula Ramsar Site as a wetland of international importance. The site is part of the Werribee and Avalon Important Bird Area, identified as such by BirdLife International because of its importance for wetland and waterbirds as well as for orange-bellied parrots.
