= Altona Treatment Plant =

Water treatment plant in Victoria, Australia

The Altona Treatment Plant of Greater Western Water is a small sewage treatment plant in Altona, Victoria, approximately 16 km west of Melbourne, Australia. Located on Queen Street between Laverton Creek and Altona Meadows, it services over 20,000 residential and business properties in the Altona, Altona Meadows, Laverton and Point Cook areas and treats close to 13 million litres of sewage a day.

== Background ==
The original Altona Sewage Treatment Plant was constructed in the 1960s to provide sewage treatment services to the Altona area. The plant was originally constructed as a temporary facility until the Western Treatment Plant was able to cope with the increasing volumes of sewage in the area.

When City West Water was established in 1995 a review of the entire City West Water network, including the Altona Sewage Treatment Plant, was undertaken. This review confirmed that there was a long-term requirement for the plant.

== Current status ==
In early 2011, the Altona Treatment Plant was upgraded to a more sophisticated recycled water treatment facility. Instead of releasing millions of litres of treated effluent into Port Phillip Bay, most of the water is now captured, treated and then used in manufacturing processes and the irrigation of recreational spaces for the community.

About 2 billion litres of recycled water is supplied annually to the plastics manufacturer Qenos for use in their boilers and cooling towers, as well as:

- 300 million litres to Sanctuary Lakes Golf Club to irrigate its golf course
- 200 million litres to Kooringal Golf Club to irrigate its golf course
- 5 million litres to Hobsons Bay City Council to irrigate Altona Green Park and 6 million litres for HD Graham Reserve. Water will also be used for urban streetscape watering and dust suppression.

The volume of high quality water produced each year is roughly equivalent to the volume of water held by 1000 Olympic sized swimming pools.

A giant robot has been used to clean the Balance Tank every year since 2019.

== See also ==
- Western Treatment Plant
- Eastern Treatment Plant
