= Werribee and Avalon Important Bird Area =

Important Bird Area in Victoria, Australia

Coordinates: 38°01′35″S 144°33′10″E

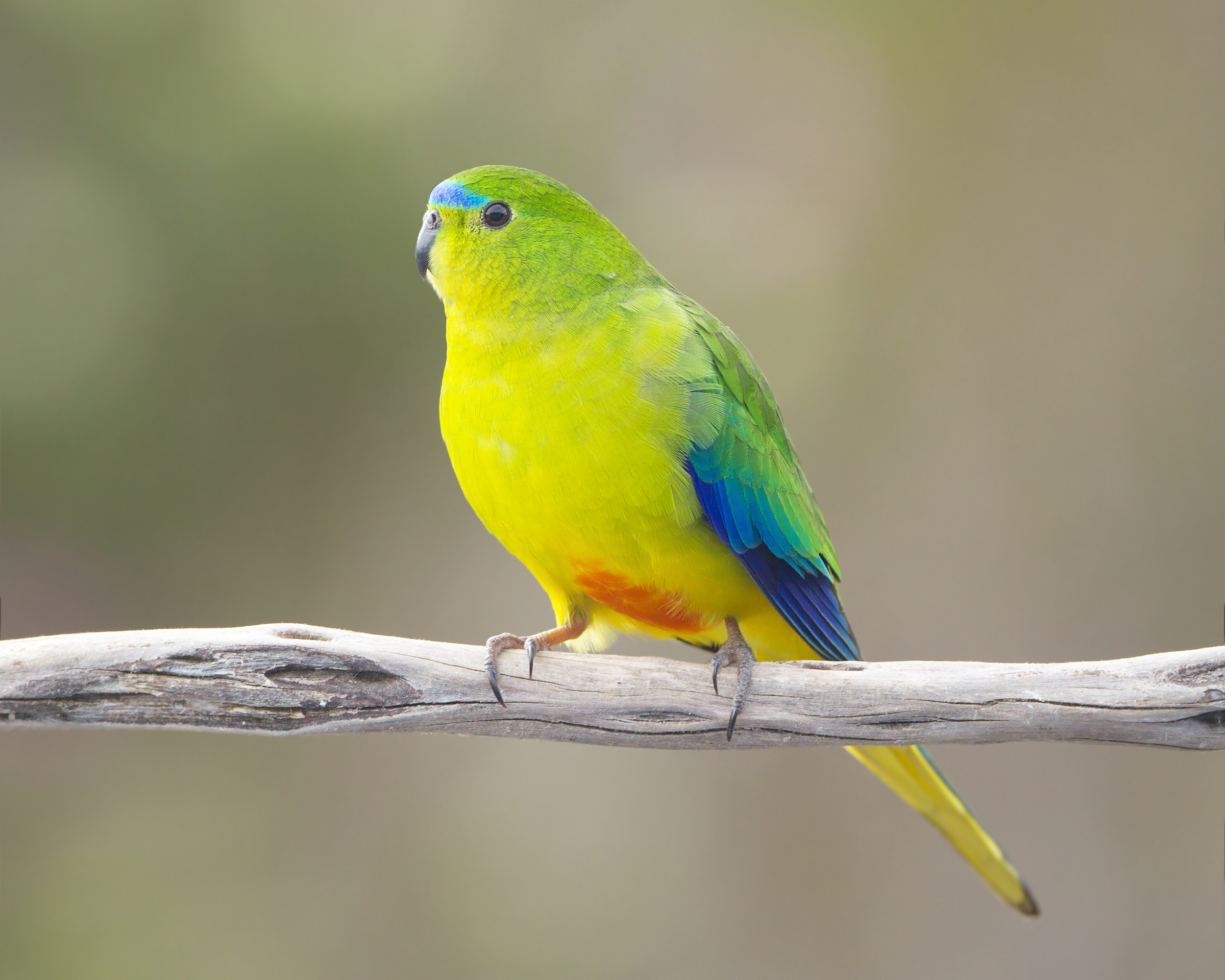
The IBA is an important area for orange-bellied parrots.

The Werribee and Avalon Important Bird Area comprises some 37 km^{2} of coastal land along the northwestern shore of Port Phillip in the state of Victoria, in southeastern Australia. It is important for a wide variety of waterbirds.

== Description ==
The site consists of wetlands stretching from the mouth of the Werribee River in the northeast to the city of Geelong in the southwest. It encompasses the sewage treatment ponds of the Western Treatment Plant, with the adjoining Spit Nature Conservation Reserve and Lake Borrie, the intertidal mudflats around Point Wilson, the Avalon saltworks, and Limeburners Bay. As well as the treatment ponds and mudflats, the coastal habitats include saltmarshes and mangroves. The site is flat and low-lying; it experiences temperatures ranging from a mean minimum of 7°C in July to a mean maximum of 24°C in January and February, with an annual rainfall of 750 mm. Apart from the saltworks, the area also forms part of the Port Phillip Bay (Western Shoreline) and Bellarine Peninsula Ramsar Site.

== Birds ==
The site has been identified as an Important Bird Area (IBA) by BirdLife International because it supports regular numbers of orange-bellied parrots, and over 1% of the world populations of blue-billed, musk, freckled and pink-eared ducks, Australian shelducks, chestnut teals, Australasian shovelers, hoary-headed grebes, red-necked stints and sharp-tailed sandpipers. Other waterbirds that use the site in substantial numbers include banded stilts, curlew sandpipers, red-capped and double-banded plovers, black-fronted dotterels, pied oystercatchers, red-necked avocets, black swans, hardheads, Pacific black ducks and great crested grebes.
