= Lake Borrie Wetlands =

Wetland in Australia

Lake Borrie
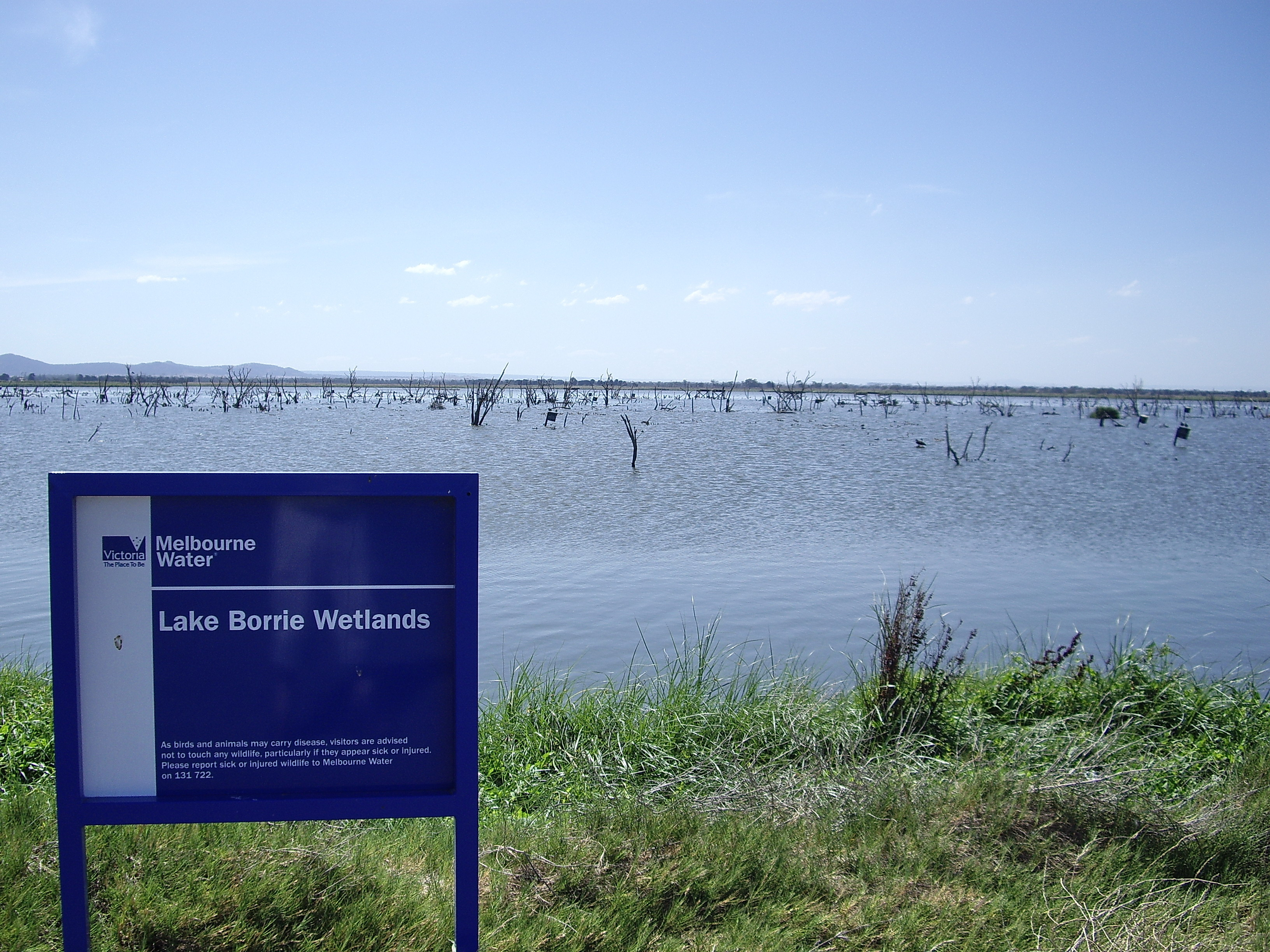
- Lake Borrie Wetlands

- Location in Victoria
- Location: Greater Geelong region, Victoria
- Coordinates: 38°0′15″S 144°34′25″E
- Type: Coastal wetland
- Primary inflows: Little River
- Primary outflows: to Port Phillip Bay
- Basin countries: Australia
- Surface area: 70 ha (170 acres)

Lake Borrie Wetlands is a coastal wetland in the Greater Geelong region of Victoria, Australia. The wetland is situated within the Western Treatment Plant at Werribee; administered by Melbourne Water.

Fed by run off from the Little River, the 70-hectare (170-acre) wetland forms part of the Port Phillip Bay (Western Shoreline) and Bellarine Peninsula Ramsar Site as a wetland of international importance. Thousands of birds amongst more than 270 different species can be found there. The lake is part of the Werribee and Avalon Important Bird Area, identified as such by BirdLife International because of its importance for wetland and waterbirds as well as for orange-bellied parrots.

The lake was named in honour of Edwin Fullarton Borrie, a civil engineer and town planner in Melbourne.

== See also ==
- List of lakes of Australia § Victoria
