= Avalon, Australia =

Avalon, Australia may refer to:

- Avalon, New South Wales, Australia
- Avalon, Victoria, Australia
- Avalon Airport, Victoria, Australia
- Australian International Airshow, sometimes called the Avalon Airshow after its hosting airport
