= William Thwaites (engineer) =

Australian civil engineer

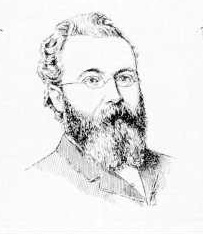
- William Thwaites in 1891
- Born: 13 August 1853; Melbourne, Australia
- Died: 19 November 1907 (aged 54); San Remo, Victoria
- Spouse(s): (1) Elizabeth Ferres (2) Margaret Barton
- Children: none

William Thwaites (1853–1907) was a civil engineer working in Melbourne, Australia, in the late nineteenth and early twentieth centuries. He was responsible for the design of Melbourne's sewerage system and supervised its construction.

== Early life and training ==
Thwaites was born in Melbourne, Australia, on 13 August 1853, the son of cabinet maker Thomas Henry Thwaites (1826-1912) and Eliza Thwaites née Raven (1831-1907), who were married on 16 September 1851.

Thwaites was educated at the Model School in Spring Street in the 1860s. In about 1858, his family moved to 64 Little Collins Street East. Thwaites trained at the University of Melbourne under the well-known engineer William Charles Kernot, obtaining the certificate of Civil Engineering and Master of Arts in 1876. He was recipient of the Argus Scholarship, which had been advocated by Kernot and Frederick McCoy in 1873.

In 1875, Thwaites was awarded the Natural Science Scholarship at the University of Melbourne. That, as part of a total of £330 in scholarships and exhibitions, greatly assisted in the funding of his education which, due to his family's limited means, would have been otherwise unobtainable. Under an agreement between Melbourne University and the Victorian Government, Thwaites undertook 12 months experience as pupil draftsman in the Railways Department, under supervision of engineer Arthur Wells.

== Career ==
After he completed this apprenticeship in 1876, Thwaites was given a permanent position with the Victorian Railways, and moved to work on the construction of the Hamilton-Portland, Oakleigh-Bunyip and Ararat-Stawell lines. However, lack of further Victorian railway work saw him shift to the South Australian Railways, where he commenced surveying for the Port Augusta to Government Gums Railway, the first stage in a projected Central Australia Railway line to Darwin.

Following that, he moved to the Port Wakefield and Kadina railway project, although he was without work during 1878, and returned to Melbourne, where he joined the Harbour Branch of the Victorian Public Works Department (PWD) in 1879. He surveyed the Portland Harbour project, the project to open a new entrance to the Gippsland Lakes, and the Sale navigation canal, as part of preparatory plans for their development under designs by John Coode. In the same year, Thwaites also undertook a survey of Swan Island for defence purposes.

In 1880, Thwaites shifted to the Water Supply Department, surveying for the Broken Creek improvement, and then, under the renamed Melbourne Water Supply Branch of the PWD, worked under mentorship of William Davidson. From 1881, he surveyed the Bruce's Creek diversion and prepared drawings for the Yan Yean clearwater channel, during which time he discovered Wallaby and Silver creeks, and demonstrated their suitability for diversion of water to Yan Yean at a time of serious water storage. He then surveyed the Wallaby and Silver creek aqueducts. Thwaites also designed a system of service reservoirs to serve the expanding Melbourne suburbs, including ones at Essendon, Caulfield and Preston. However, a major failure during that period was the cracking of the new water main over Merri Creek from the Yan Yean reservoir, which W.C. Kernot showed was caused by errors in Thwaites' and Davidson's design.

In 1883, Thwaites was appointed Engineer, Roads, Bridges and Drainage, in the PWD, and undertook a series of swamp reclamation schemes, including the Port Melbourne Lagoon (1885), West Melbourne Swamp, Moonee Ponds Creek, Koo-Wee-Rup Swamp (1890), the Moe River and Lake Condah, although the last was completed by Carlo Catani. In 1889, Thwaites also designed the system for pumping water to the Melbourne Botanic Gardens from Dights Falls on the Yarra River. Thwaites was made engineer in charge of the water supply branch in 1890, and engineer-in-chief of the Melbourne and Metropolitan Board of Works (MMBW) in 1891.

== Professional roles ==
Thwaites was made a member of the Victorian Institute of Engineers in 1881, and was president in 1892. He became a councillor of the Institute of Surveyors in 1887, was made a member of the Institution of Civil Engineers (ICE), London, in 1889, and was the Australasian representative on the ICE council from 1899 to 1901.

He was made a co-examiner in engineering at the University of Melbourne and held a position on the University Council from 1890, including the subcommittee which set the course of mathematics in engineering degrees, continuing into the 20th century when Kernot was waning. Thwaites was known to have had "a genius for statistics", especially of the climate and geography of the metropolitan area, and owned among the best engineering libraries in Victoria.

== Melbourne sewerage system ==
Thwaites' greatest achievement was the design of Melbourne's underground sewerage scheme and the supervision of its construction. At the time, it was the largest civil engineering project in the history of Victoria. He initially gave evidence to the Royal Commission into the Sanitary Conditions of Melbourne in 1889, at which he produced a detailed and comprehensive scheme for underground sewers for Melbourne. Although British engineer James Mansergh was brought to Australia to advise on the sewerage system, and proposed a number of design options, a 2011 biography of Thwaites by Robert La Nauze demonstrated that Mansergh drew strongly from Thwaites' earlier report, and it was left to Thwaites, when appointed to the task, to put the plans into practice.

Thwaites successfully argued for a modification of Mansergh's proposals, involving a reduction in the diameter of the main sewer pipes, and so "...removed a design fault in Mansergh’s scheme that would have led to embarrassing blockages". The large main sewers proposed by Mansergh would not have created sufficient velocity to scour solids, particularly in the early stages before many properties were connected, and Thwaites believed they would therefore require manual cleaning. His solution was to both reduce the diameter of the mains and use ovoid-shaped sewers, which had a narrower section at the base that concentrated the flow of sewage and increased its velocity. Other changes were the construction of a single pumping station at Spotswood and a single sewage treatment farm at Werribee.

Construction began on the sewers in 1892 and the first house connections were made in 1897. Thwaites reported to the 1896 and 1900 parliamentary committees of inquiry into the progress of the sewerage works, and dealt with a variety of complaints both personally and in detailed reports.

== Illness and death ==
After being "seized with illness", Thwaites died in San Remo on 19 November 1907, from uraemia and pneumonia. At the time, his massive sewerage project was nearing completion. After being honoured with a funeral procession more than a mile long, he was buried in Melbourne General Cemetery.

== Personal life ==
Thwaites was married twice, first to Elizabeth Ferres (1855–1905) on 18 October 1877, and again on 16 December 1905 to Margaret Barton (1869-1942), who survived him. No children were born to either marriage, but he and Elizabeth adopted a daughter, Elsie May (1886-1958), in 1886.

== See also ==
- Water supply and sanitation in Australia
