= West Melbourne Swamp =

Coordinates: 37.813378°S 144.9330°E

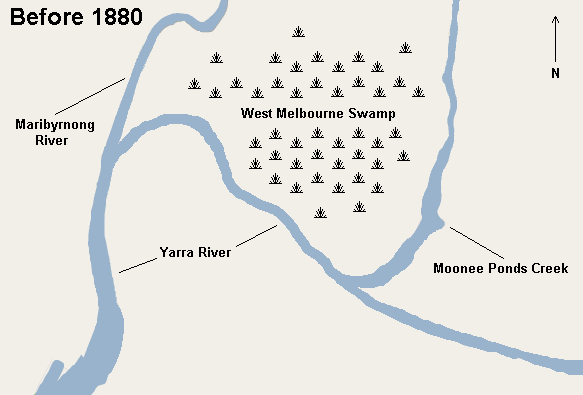
Lower Yarra River and West Melbourne Swamp before its drainage.

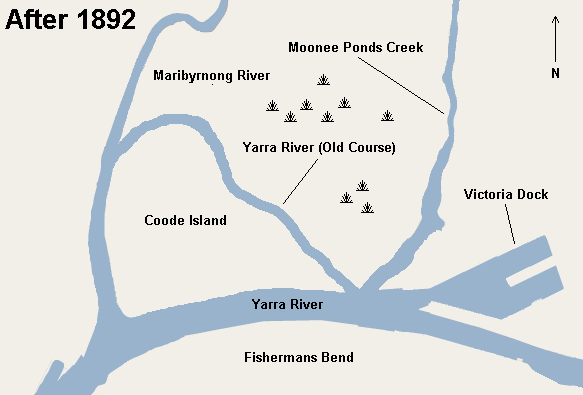
The creation of Coode Island and remainder of West Melbourne Swamp after construction of Coode Canal 1880–1892

The West Melbourne Swamp also known as Batman's Swamp, was a large saltwater wetland located to the west of the city of Melbourne, Victoria. It was an important resource for Aboriginal people.

Surveyor Charles Grimes observed the swamp when he climbed a nearby hill during his 1803 voyage to chart Port Philip Bay. It became known as Batman's Swamp, after pioneer settler John Batman, who built a house at the base of the nearby Batman's Hill in April 1836, where he lived until his death in 1839. In 1912, George Gordon McCrae (son of diarist Georgiana McCrae) described it as being, in 1841: a real lake, intensely blue, nearly oval, and full of the clearest salt water. The lagoon was also described as; having a bottom of solid blue clay and laying at the high water level while the flats surrounding it were about one metre above high tide...

Because of its distance from the city and its unsuitability for residential development, the land in the area became the location for many noxious industries, such as abattoirs, fellmongeries, tanneries and rubbish depots. In 1873, a Royal Commission into the development of the area described the swamp as "a disgusting swamp as repulsive in its present aspect as it is pestilent in its influence". The Commission recommended some residential development to the immediate west of the city, the reservation of areas along the Yarra River for docks, warehouses and industry, with the rest of the land being given over to agriculture and parkland.

Drainage of the swamp was considered from the mid-19th century, but did not commence in earnest until about 1877, when a steam-operated pump was set up near Brown's Hill at South Kensington, and drains dug along Swamp Road, which was later reconstructed as Dynon Road, connecting to West Melbourne. Draining began in earnest from around 1890, under the design and supervision of Public Works Department (Victoria) engineer William Thwaites (engineer). At the same time, the outlet of Moonee Ponds Creek was widened to become Railway (Coal) Canal, diverting flood waters from the swamp, and providing direct water access for colliers from the coal port of Newcastle to the coaling facilities at the North Melbourne locomotive depot of the Victorian Railways. Appleton Dock was constructed in the 1950 at the outlet of Moonee Ponds Creek (Railway Canal).

In 1907, the Footscray contractor, Michael Walsh, won a large state government contract to undertake further drainage. During the Great Depression of the 1930s, the swamp margins and the bottom of Dudley Street became the site of a shantytown built by the unemployed, known as Dudley Flats.

== See also ==
- Melbourne Docklands
- West Melbourne, Victoria
- Yarra River
