= Hume and Hovell expedition =

Exploration of eastern Australia from 1824 to 1825

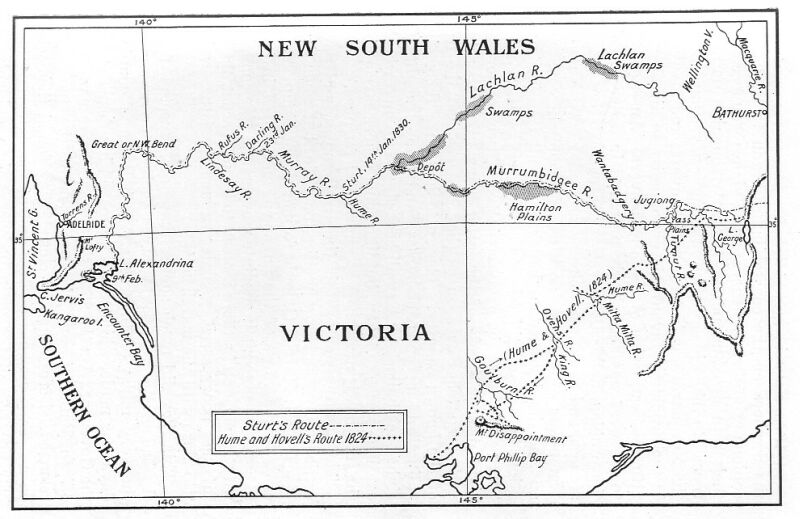
Hume and Hovells 1824 expedition is shown by the broken line

The Hume and Hovell expedition was a journey of exploration undertaken in eastern Australia. In 1824 the Governor of New South Wales, Sir Thomas Brisbane, commissioned Hamilton Hume and former Royal Navy Captain William Hovell to lead an expedition to find new grazing land in the south of the colony, and also to find an answer to the mystery of where New South Wales's western rivers flowed.

Surveyor General John Oxley asserted that no river could fall into the sea between Cape Otway and Spencer Gulf, and that the country south of parallel of 34 degrees was ' uninhabitable and useless for all purposes of civilised men,' and for the time exploration in this direction was greatly discouraged. In 1824, newly appointed Sir Thomas Brisbane, who disbelieved this statement, offered to land a party of prisoners near Wilson's Promontory and grant them a free pardon, as well as a grant of land, to those who found their way overland to Sydney.

Alexander Berry recommended the Governor to secure the services of Hume to lead the exploring party. Hume declined to undertake that task but instead offered, if supplied with men and horses, to go from Lake George to Bass Straits. This was not carried out. But shortly afterwards Hume and W. H. Hovell, of Minto, agreed together to undertake an expedition in that direction. They found men and horses and bullocks; the Government furnished them with pack saddles, tarpaulins, tent, arms, ammunition, and skeleton charts.

== Departure ==
On 2 October 1824, Hovell and Hume met at Hume's house in Appin, and started upon their expedition. The party, when complete, consisted of eight people, Hume and his three men, Claude Bossowa, Henry Angel, and James Fitzpatrick. As well as Hovell and his three men, Thomas Boyd, William Bollard, and Thomas Smith.

They reached Hume's station near 'Lake George' on the 13th. In those times, 'Lake George' also referred to the district, and Hume's station, Wooloobidallah—later called Collingwood Station—was closer to modern-day Gunning than to the lake. However, some of the party did make an excursion to the lake. On the 14th, "Hume and Hovell, with two of the men, proceed to Lake George, in order to ascertain the bearings and distance of the Lake from Hume's station". They returned to Hume's station at dusk. They started their journey on the 17th. On the 18th, they camped near the site of Hume's later residence, Cooma Cottage. On the 19th they passed Yarrh – or as they are now called Yass Plains.

Their first great difficulty was in crossing the Murrumbidgee which was in full flood at the time. The timber growing on the banks of this river was too heavy to float, so Hume resolved to make a raft of the body of one of their carts. Hume and Hovell's man Boyd, swam across the river first, with a small rope between their teeth, to which was attached a line long enough to reach across the river. It was a work of peril, as the current was strong. But they succeeded, and then, with much labour, got the whole party, with baggage and cattle, safely over.

On 24 October they came up to what seemed an impenetrable mountain barrier. There was an argument between the leaders concerning the best route to take which resulted in the party splitting up. The equipment was divided, and they prepared to cut their one tent in halves. Hume and Hovell fought bitterly over the frying-pan, which broke in their hands. One of them taking the handle, the other the pan itself. Later, however, Hovell rejoined Hume when he found he had made a mistake.

Hume, with two men, following a chain of ponds, came to a chasm through which the whole party afterwards descended. On the 31st they found themselves on the western edge of the tableland. The descent was not accomplished without much difficulty. On 6 November, they came in sight of the snow-covered Australian Alps. They came after this upon a very rich country, abounding in kangaroos and other animals, with frequent tracks of aborigines; and on Tuesday, 16 November, they arrived suddenly on the banks of a "fine river".

Hume was the first to see the river, near the site of Albury and named it the "Hume", (now the Murray River) after his father. This river, where they first came upon it, is about 50m in breadth, and of considerable depth. The current was about three miles an hour, and the water clear.

They improvised a tarpaulin covered wicker boat and they were able to eventually cross and continue into what is now known as Victoria.

They proceeded south crossing the Ovens River and Goulburn River by a route further to the east of the Hume Highway and closer to the foothills of Mount Buffalo.

== Crossing the Great Divide ==
Four days after crossing the Goulburn River, impassable country was reached. The party spent three days attempting to cross the Great Dividing Range at Mt Disappointment but were thwarted. Hume shifted direction to the west and, on the 12 December, reached less hilly country at the future township of Broadford, where they camped.

Hume headed towards similarly low ranges to the south and found a pass in that direction next day. He led the party across the Dividing Range at Hume’s Pass, Wandong, and, on 16 December 1824, reached Corio Bay, an arm of Port Phillip Bay, at Bird Rock, Point Lillias, north of the future site of Geelong.

Hovell left incontrovertible surveying proof of the Geelong location when he took a bearing of N10W (350 degrees) from there to Mt Flinders (Mt Wollstonecraft, You Yangs), at a distance of 8 miles, and wrote it in his diary that still exists.

Hovell claimed that he had measured their longitude on the same day but, in reality, he had read it off the sketch map that they had drafted themselves during the trip. In 1867, Hovell admitted that he did not take any longitude measurements and blamed Hume for it.

Prior to that admission, Dr William Bland, who wrote the first book on the journey in 1831, invented the myth that Hovell made an error of one degree in longitude in order to protect the explorer. It was not the only myth emanating from the pen of Bland. From 1825, Hume wrote on four occasions that he had reached Western Port, his original destination. That was repeated in nine newspaper articles by Bland. It was not until 1827, when it was demonstrated by Hovell that the journey had ended near Geelong, that the pair changed their stories to identify that location.

On 18 December, the party turned back towards New South Wales. Hume chose to travel more to the west to avoid the mountainous country and save considerable time. It was a sound decision because, on 16 January 1825, just as their flour ran out, they reached the carts they had left behind. Two days later, they arrived at Hume's station at Gunning.

On 18 November 1826, based on the discoveries of Hume and Hovell, Colonel Stewart, Captain S. Wright, and Lieutenant Burchell were sent in HMS Fly (Captain Wetherall), with the brigs Dragon and Amity, under orders to proceed to Western Port and establish a colony there. They took a number of convicts and a small force of troops from the 3rd and 93rd regiments. Hovell was sent with the party as guide. While exploring Western Port, it became apparent to Hovell that he had not reached it on his earlier trip.

Both Hovell and Hume were publicly rebuked for their error in incorrectly identifying Western Port. They had become implicated by association with the wasted expense of setting up a new settlement there, based upon their fulsome recommendations of the value of the region.

== Return to Sydney ==
Relations between the "currency lad" (first-generation Australian) Hume and the aloof Englishman Hovell had deteriorated, and they raced each other back to Sydney to claim credit for their discoveries. They arrived in January, 1825, and were both rewarded with large land grants by Governor Brisbane. They later published conflicting accounts of the journey, each claiming leadership.

The Hume and Hovell expedition disproved the widely held view that the interior of Australia was an uninhabitable wilderness. They found abundant well-watered grazing land between the Murrumbidgee and the Murray, on the huge fertile coastal plains around Port Phillip, and then on the plains across North Eastern Victoria all the way to the Murray River during their return journey. It took another thirteen years for settlers from New South Wales to follow their route in 1837, and only after the richness of the territory was confirmed by Sir Thomas Mitchell in 1836. Some parts of their route formed the Hume Highway from Sydney to Melbourne via Albury.

== The route ==
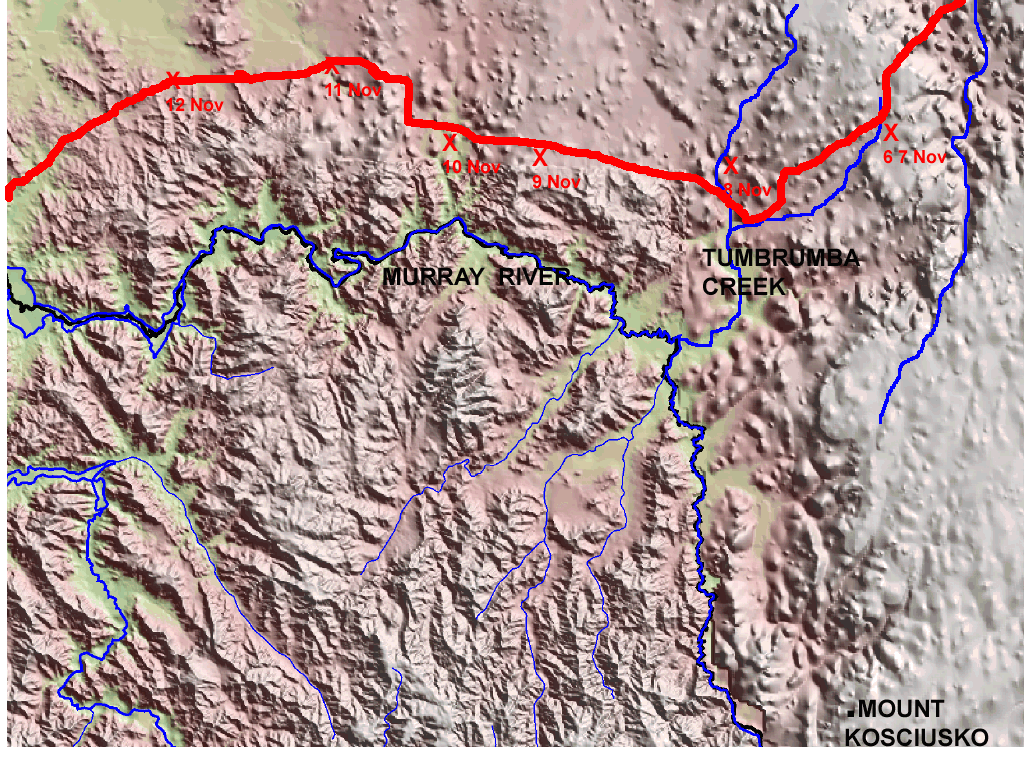
Route of Hume & Hovell expedition, 5 to 12 November 1824

Route of Hume & Hovell expedition 12 to 21 November 1824

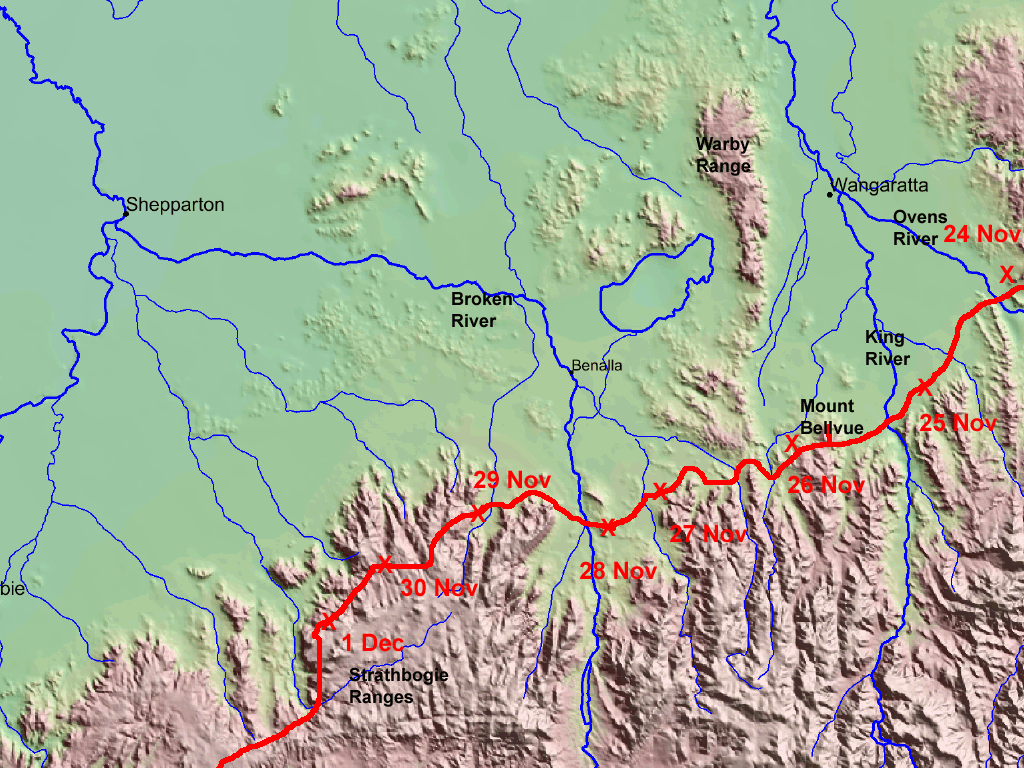
Route of Hume & Hovell expedition 22 to 30 November 1824

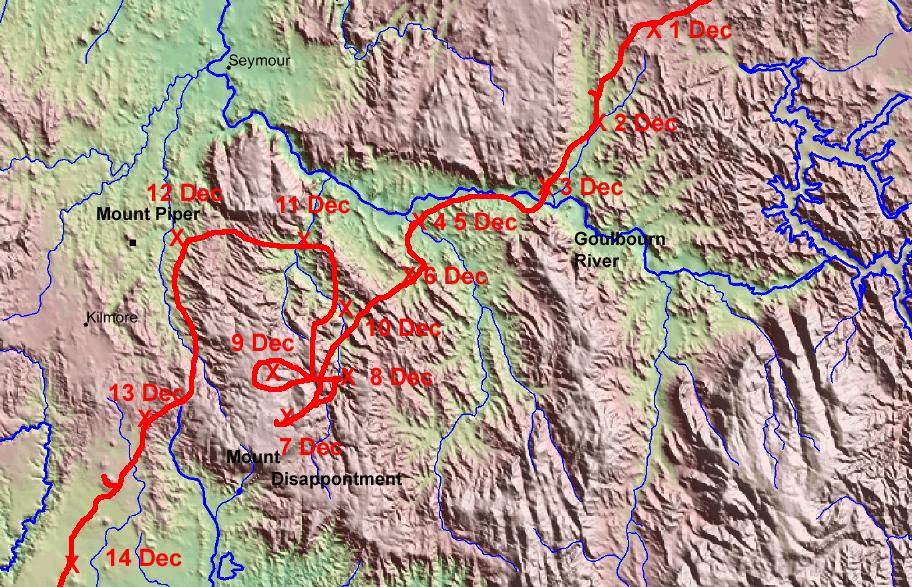
Route of Hume & Hovell expedition 1 to 14 December 1824

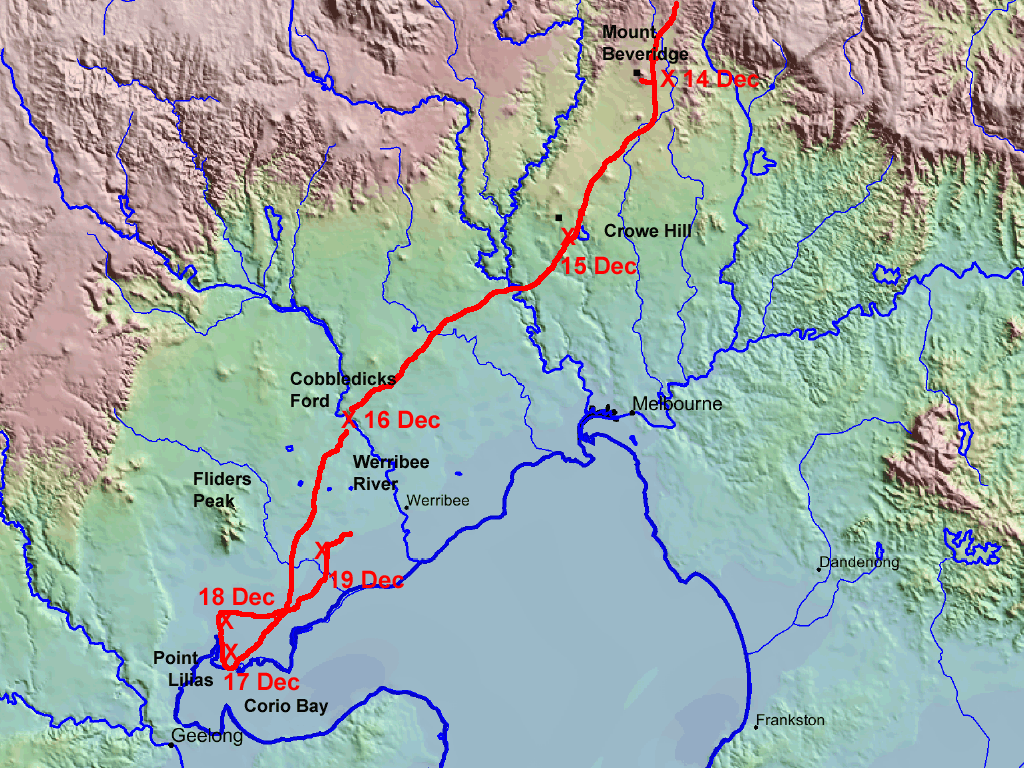
Route of Hume & Hovell expedition 15 to 19 December 1824

== Monuments ==
Within the Greater Melbourne area, monuments commemorating the route of the Hume and Hovell expedition can be found at Beveridge, Greenvale, St. Albans, Werribee and Lara. There are also monuments in other locations in north-eastern Victoria and southern New South Wales.

Appin, New South Wales

Myrtleford

=== Beveridge, Victoria ===
This Beveridge Monument and interpretive panel was built in 1999, at the foot of Mount Fraser, to mark the location from which Hume & Hovell first sighted the sea. The original monument, erected in 1924, is on private land nearby.

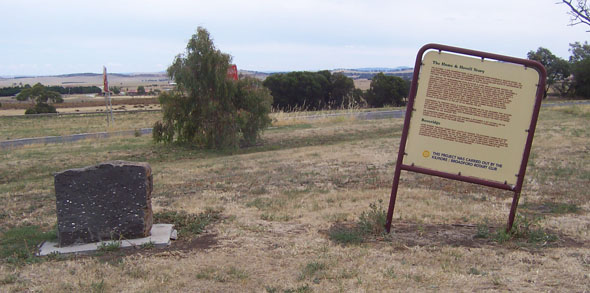
The Monument

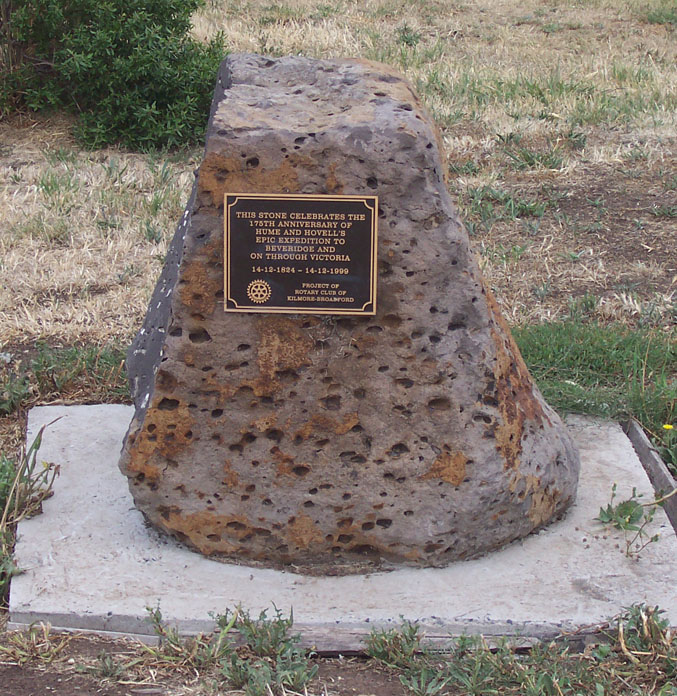
The Plaque

The Sign

=== Ebden, Victoria ===
Ebden, Victoria

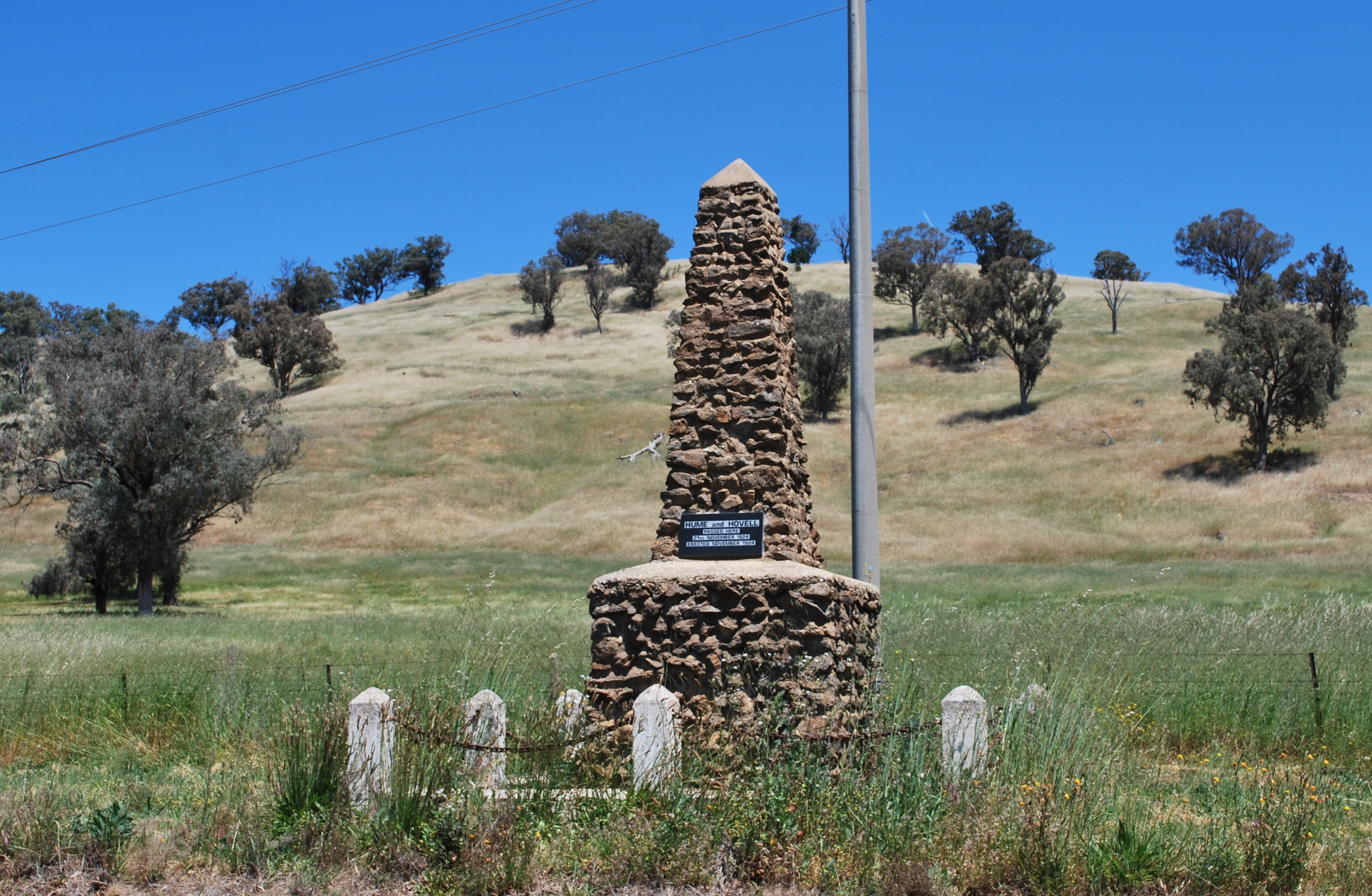
Ebden Hume & Hovell Memorial

=== Euroa, Victoria ===
Monument at Euroa.

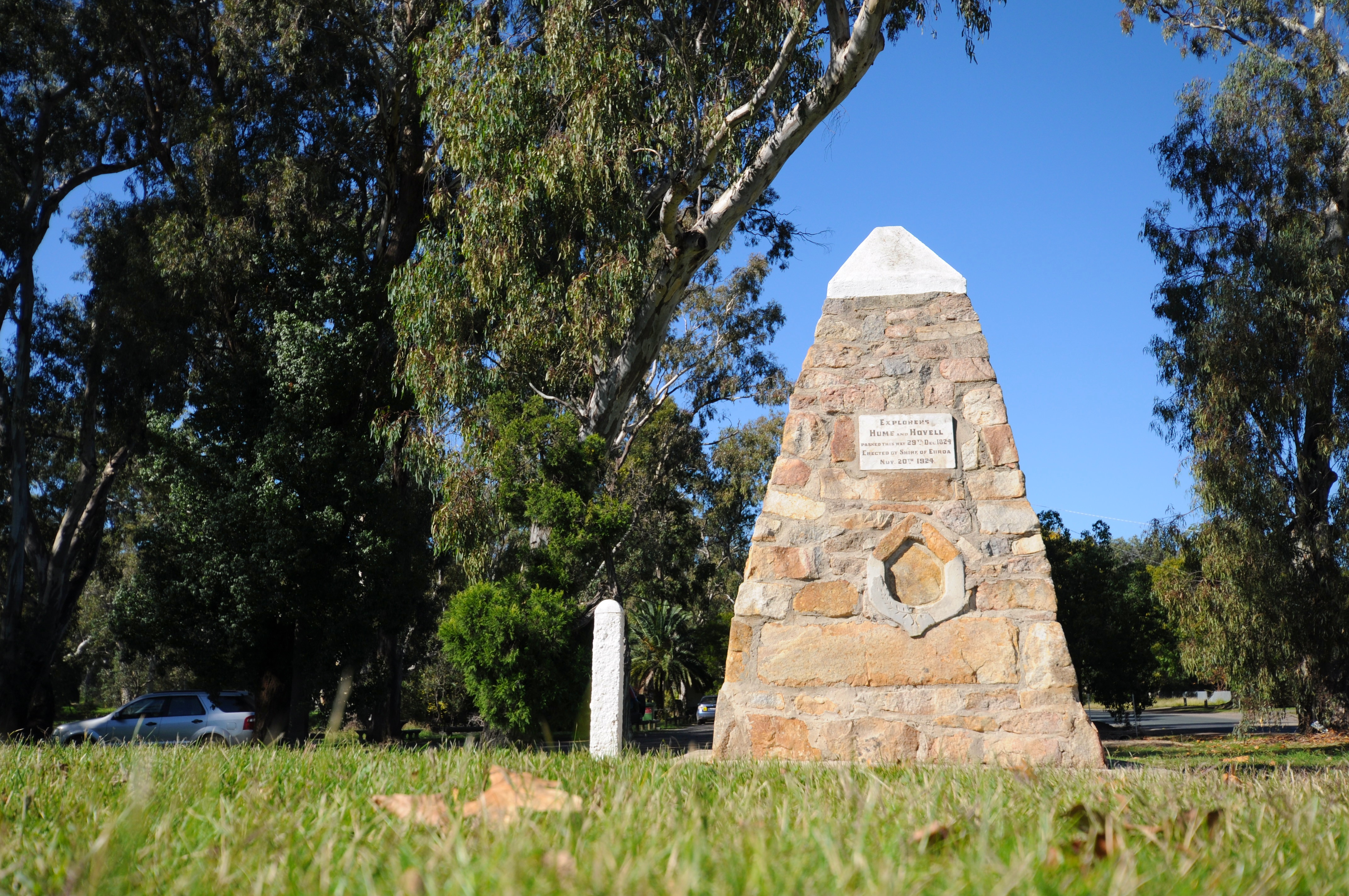
Euroa Hume and Hovell Monument

=== Gunning, NSW ===
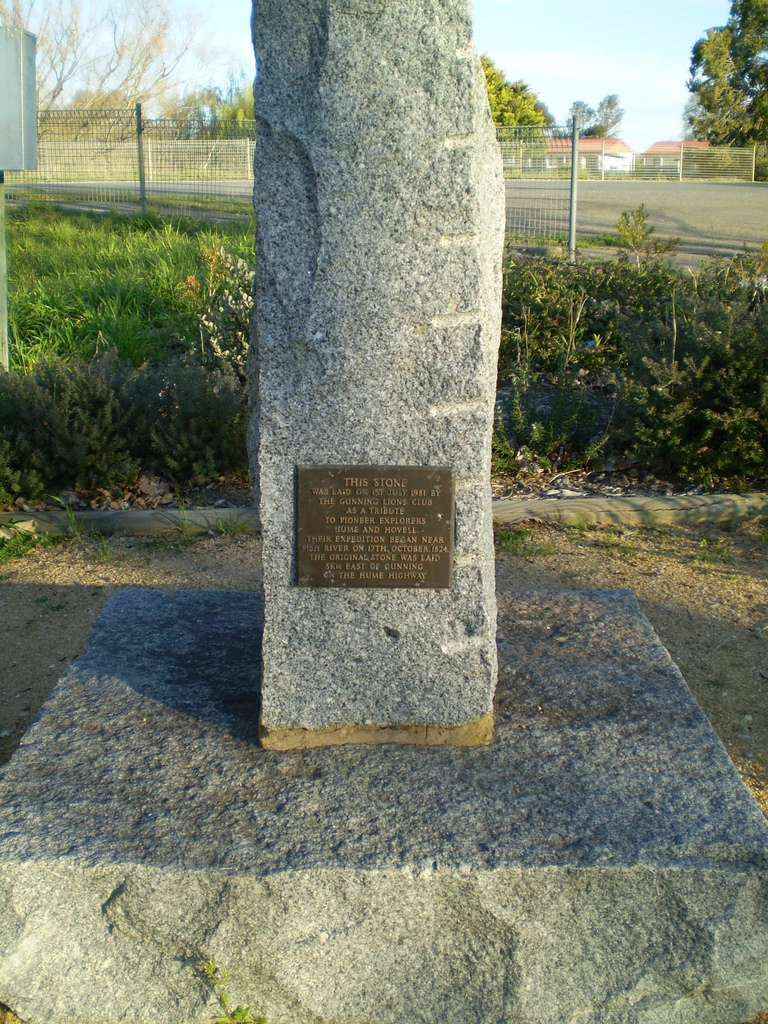
Hume and Hovell Monument, Gunning

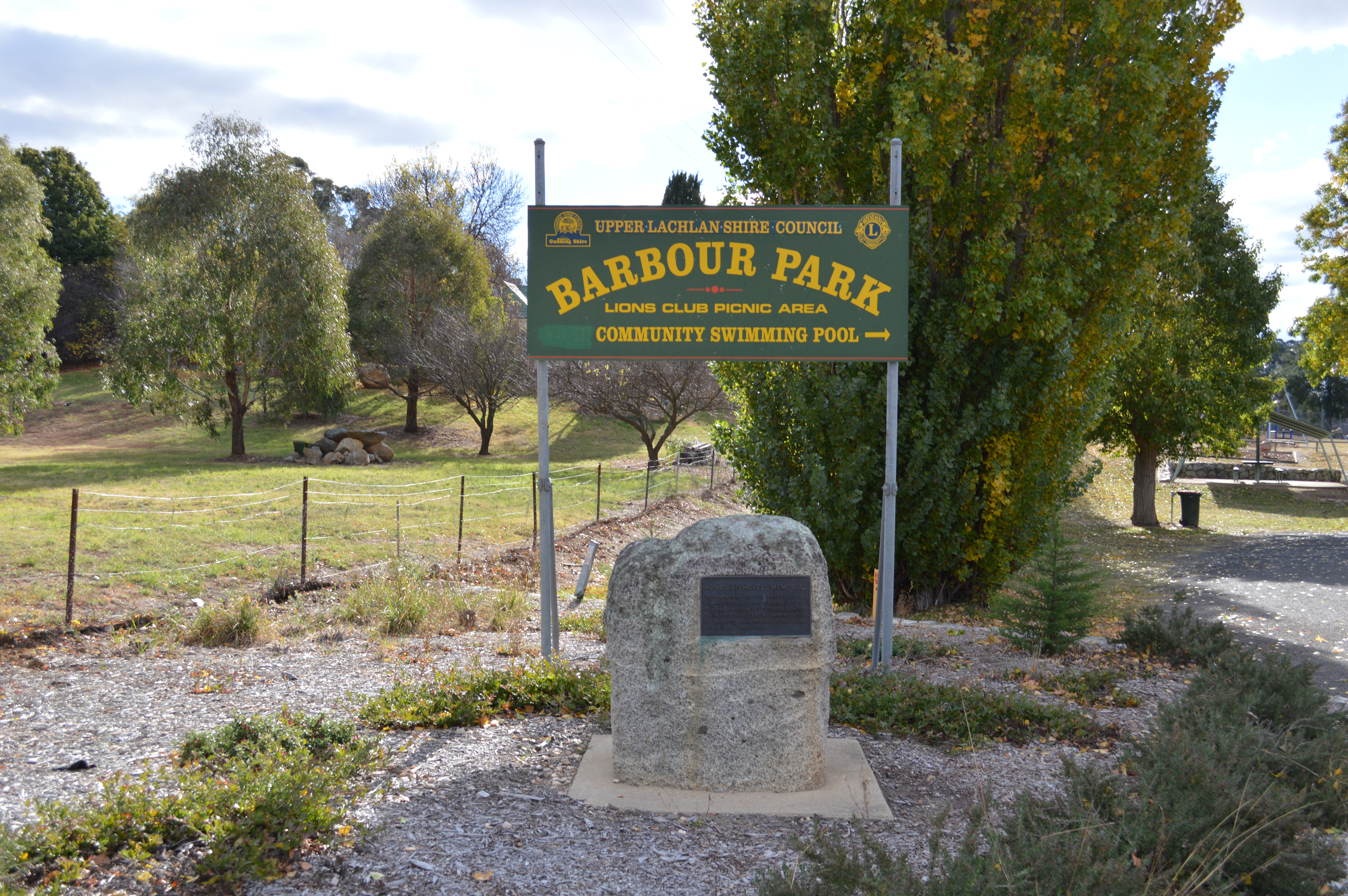
Gunning Barbour Park Hume and Hovell Memorial

=== Lara, Victoria ===
Monument at Lara.

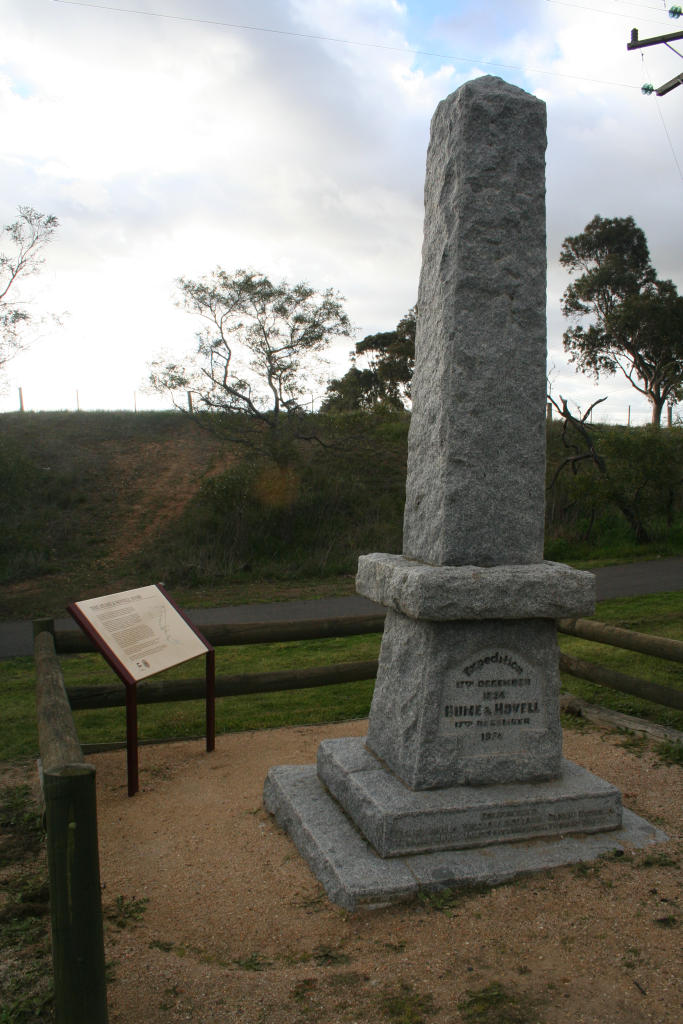
The Monument

=== Murmungee, Victoria ===
Monument at Murmungee, VIC

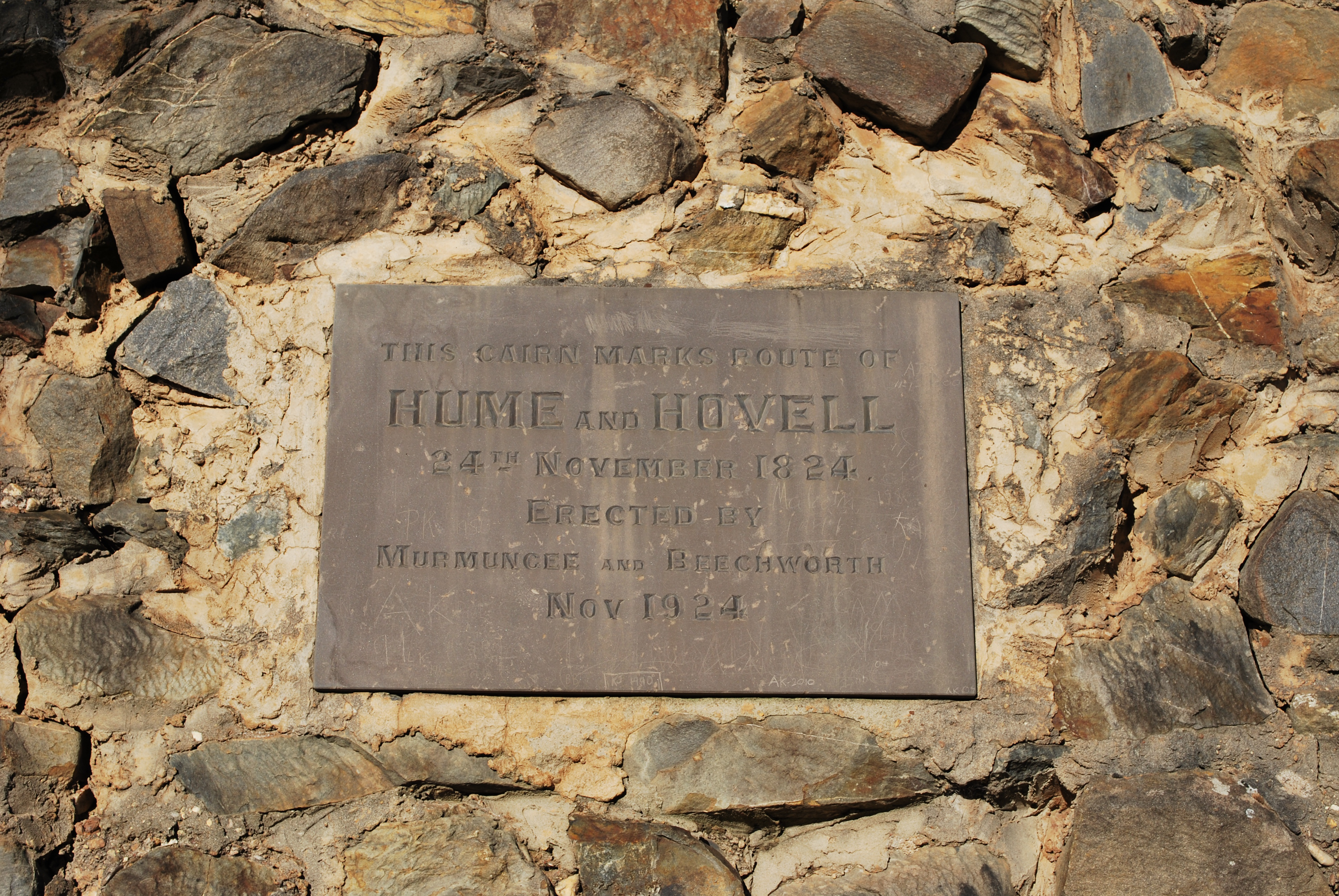
Murmungee Hume and Hovell Monument

== Hovell’s primary evidence in relation to the termination point of the expedition ==
None of the following ‘primary evidence’ has been addressed by any researcher in the past.

Hovell’s Journal (HJ) reveals that after crossing the range the expedition on December 14 travelled in a SSW direction (HJ p. 148). Hovell does not mention any change in direction until the morning of December 16 when they proceed in a SW by S direction (HJ p. 158) (Mid-way between SW and SSW [213.75 deg.]).

On December 15, Hovell briefly mentions a river that he sighted naming it ‘The Yar’ (HJ p. 158). Then again during the return journey, whilst reminiscing about the expedition on December 21 he leaves no doubt that he is describing the Yarra River (HJ pp. 185 - 186).

Analyzing direction of travel, SSW, for the two days after crossing the range, and by analyzing elevations from where they could have seen the Yarra River, it is obvious that they were at Avondale Heights looking down the Maribyrnong River Valley. Following this sighting they camped at the Maribyrnong River, which Hume named the ‘Arndell’ after Hovell’s father-in-law Dr Arndell and Hovell’s son (HJ p. 158). No indication of any feud between the two explorers.

On December 16, Hovell measured latitude S 38 deg. 6 min. and E 145 deg. 23 sec. before changing direction of travel from SWbS to ‘nearly south’ (HJ pp. 158 - 159)

Hovell has been criticized for producing incorrect latitude and longitude readings, but the readings were taken inland, therefore a false horizon was used to determine latitude, which was only out by 0 deg. 20 sec. To obtain longitude you must have accurate time and Hovell’s chronometer was only out by 2 minutes after travelling for 3 months since leaving Sydney.

Another strong indicator that there was never a feud between the two explorers during the expedition is Hovell’s alteration to his journal page 164 par 3 where he reverses wording from ‘Myself and Mr Hume marks each an ‘H’ on a tree…’ to read ‘Mr Hume and self marks each an ‘H’ on a tree...’ (HJ p. 164) This tree, no longer in existence, would have been past the end of Farrants Road, Werribee South.

Hovell provided two bearings for the location of this tree, N10W (HJ p. 164) aligns with Mt Cottrell, which Hovell named Mt Wollstoncraft, and the second bearing, NE (HJ p. 164), aligns back to Point Cook which Hovell named Point Hamilton, obviously after Hamilton Hume. Once again, no sign of any feud.

It is this second bearing of NE that all previous researchers have omitted/deleted as it doesn’t work for a Corio Bay termination. This is one of the many pieces of corruption of primary evidence performed by proponents for a Corio Bay termination.

=== Dr. William Bland’s strong secondary evidence. ===
Dr. William Bland published an edited book ‘Journey of Discovery to Port Phillip, New South Wales, in 1824 and 1825’ by WH Hovell and H Hume, Esquires. Compiled and edited by William Bland 1789 – 1868. First Edition Published 1831, Second Edition Published 1837.

Bland stated that his reason for publishing the book was that future generations may wish to follow the path of the explorers. He apologized that the lateness in publishing the book was due to illness and the lack of printing paper in the colony.

Bland’s book primarily details the route taken by the expedition with much of Hovell’s flora and fauna descriptions removed. Bland stated that he worked from all the material from the expedition. Fortunately, some of Hovell’s observations and bearings not included in his journal, have been included in Bland’s edited book. This material must have come from Hovell’s missing bearing book as they could not have been invented by anyone not on the expedition.

On December 18, 1824, the first day of their return journey, after traveling about 15 mile, Hovell made eight observations and took bearings from a neck of land jutting out into the Bay a considerable distance with a large creek on the left (west) side. Detail of these eight observations and bearings is not recorded in Hovell’s Journal, but Hovell had previously stated, ‘refer to Bearing Book’. (HJ p. 159) when discussing observations taken at the extreme point, later referred to as Point Hamilton (Point Cook).

These eight observations and bearings were undeniably taken from Point Gellibrand, Williamstown, with two of Hovell’s bearings, N76E and N85E, aligning with Mt Dandenong at the northern end, and Dunns Hill at the southern end of the Dandenong Ranges (HJ pp. 116 - 121).

Obviously, they could not have walked from Corio Bay to Point Gellibrand in one day, this being just one of many pieces of evidence that the Werribee River was the termination point of the 1824 – 1825 Hume and Hovell expedition.
