= City West Water =

Water company in Australia

Agency overview
- Formed: 1 January 1995
- Preceding agencies: Melbourne Water; Melbourne & Metropolitan Board of Works
- Dissolved: 30 June 2021
- Superseding agency: Greater Western Water
- Jurisdiction: Government of Victoria
- Headquarters: Footscray, Victoria, Australia
- Employees: Over 400
- Minister responsible: Lisa Neville, Minister for Water
- Agency executive: Maree Lang, Managing Director
- Website: www.citywestwater.com.au

City West Water Corporation was a Government of Victoria retail water corporation that provided drinking water, sewerage, trade waste and recycled water services in the Melbourne central business district, inner and western suburbs. The service area included the local government areas of Brimbank, Hobsons Bay, Maribyrnong, Melbourne (north of the Yarra River), Moonee Valley, Wyndham, Yarra and parts of Melton and Hume.

The water distributed by City West Water was supplied by Melbourne Water and primarily sourced from Melbourne Water's water supply catchments in the upper reaches of the Yarra River and the Thomson River, as well as the Victorian Desalination Plant. The majority of the sewage collected by City West Water was transferred to Melbourne Water for treatment at its Western Treatment Plant. A portion of sewage collected by City West Water was treated at City West Water's own Altona Treatment Plant.

The main office of City West Water was located in Footscray. Oversight was provided by a board of directors appointed by the Minister for Water under the Water Act 1989 (Vic.). On 1 July 2021, City West Water Corporation merged with the neighbouring Western Region Water Corporation to form Greater Western Water. The merger was effected by a determination of the Victorian Minister for Water under provisions of the Water Act 1989 (Vic.).
