= Spit Nature Conservation Reserve =

Protected area in Victoria, Australia

Spit Conservation Reserve
- IUCN category Ia (strict nature reserve)
- Location within Victoria
- Location: Victoria
- Nearest city: Werribee
- Coordinates: 38°02′58″S 144°31′10″E
- Area: 3 km^{2} (1.2 sq mi)
- Governing body: Parks Victoria

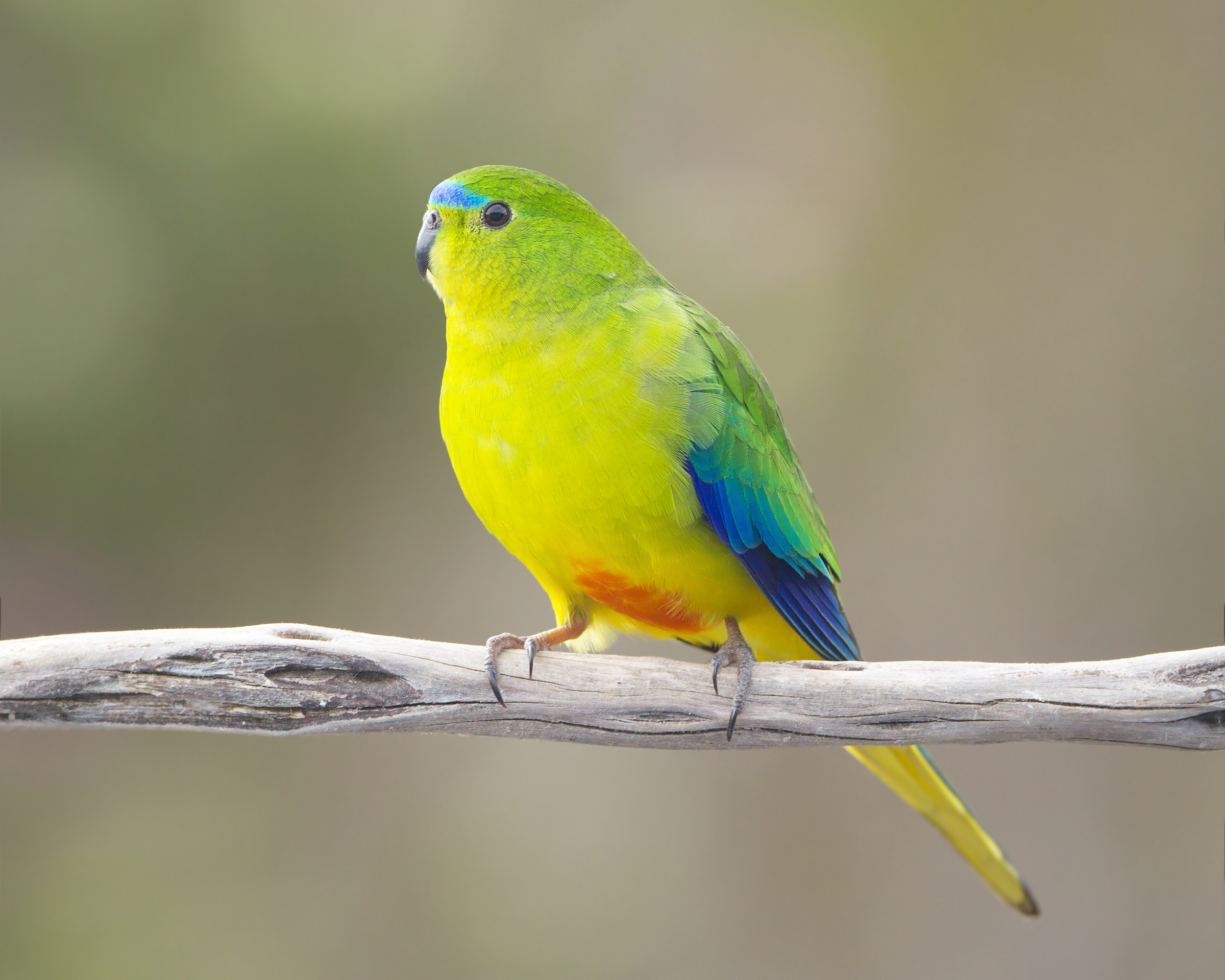
Orange-bellied Parrot (Neophema chrysogaster), which winters at the reserve.

The Spit Nature Conservation Reserve is a 3-kilometer nature reserve on the north-western shore of Port Phillip, a large bay in Victoria, Australia. It consists of public land set aside to conserve and protect species, communities, and habitats of indigenous plants and animals. It is adjacent to the Werribee Sewage Farm and is managed by Parks Victoria.

== Description ==
The reserve contains sand spits, a lagoon, and an area of saltmarsh. Together the north and south spits are approximately four kilometres long and vary in shape and size depending on the tide and, over longer periods, the onshore currents. At high tide, the depth of the lagoon reaches about one metre, while at low tide a mudflat is exposed. This environment provides an area that is an extremely important feeding ground for a variety of birds, especially waders and waterbirds. The salt marsh is important, as it is one of the main wintering sites for the critically endangered orange-bellied parrot.

== Values ==
The reserve is listed as a wetland of international importance under the Ramsar Convention as part of the Port Phillip Bay (Western Shoreline) and Bellarine Peninsula Ramsar Site. Other international treaties covering the reserve and its birdlife include the China–Australia Migratory Bird Agreement, the Japan–Australia Migratory Bird Agreement, and the Bonn Convention. The reserve is part of the Werribee and Avalon Important Bird Area, identified as such by BirdLife International because of its importance for wetland and waterbirds as well as for orange-bellied parrots.

== Access ==
The only way to approach the reserve by land is through the Werribee Sewage Farm. There is no general public access to the reserve, though visitors with birdwatching permits to the sewage farm can observe the birdlife from the boundary.
