= Dights Falls =

Weir and rapids in Melbourne, Victoria, Australia

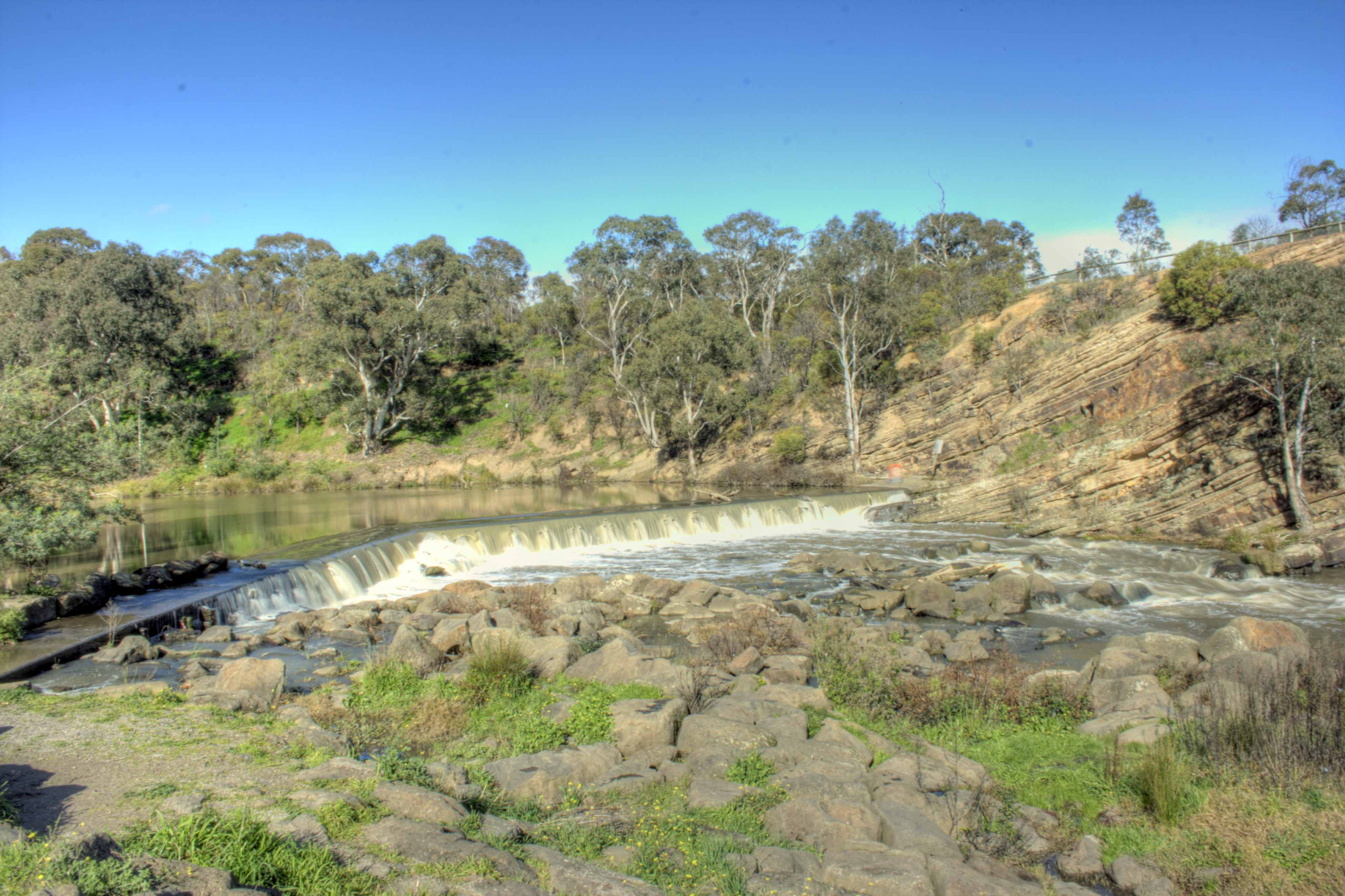
- The weir across the Yarra River showing the silurian sandstone hillside

- Location of the weir in Greater Metropolitan Melbourne
- Interactive map of Dights Falls
- Country: Australia
- Location: Abbotsford, Melbourne, Victoria
- Coordinates: 37°47′49″S 145°00′04″E
- Purpose: Irrigation; Recreation
- Status: Operational
- Opening date: c. 1839
- Built by: John Dight
- Designed by: William Thwaites
- Operator: Melbourne Water

Dam and spillways
- Type of dam: Barrage
- Impounds: Yarra River

Victorian Heritage Register
- Official name: Dights Mill Site
- Type: Registered place
- Designated: 20 August 1982
- Reference no.: H1522
- Heritage overlay nos.: HO48, HO488
- Category: Manufacturing and Processing

Dights Falls is a rapid and weir across the Yarra River, located in Abbotsford, Melbourne, in Victoria, Australia. The weir is situated downstream of the Yarra's confluence with Merri Creek, south of where the Eastern Freeway crosses the creek. At Dights Falls, the Yarra narrows and is constricted between 800,000-year-old volcanic, basaltic lava flow and a much older steep, silurian, sedimentary spur. The north side also contains abundant graptolite fossils in sedimentary sandstone.

== History ==
The weir is located on the traditional lands of Wurundjeri. The rock falls would have provided the Aboriginal people with a natural river crossing and place to trap migrating fish. It was also a meeting place for many clans where they would trade, settle disputes and exchange brides.

=== Colonial discovery ===
In January 1803, Charles Grimes, the deputy surveyor-general of the Colony of New South Wales, was sent to Port Phillip to survey the area. Sailing on the schooner Cumberland, under the command of Acting Lieutenant Charles Robbins, the party entered Port Phillip on 20 January 1803. Grimes explored the Yarra by boat for several miles until he reached Dights Falls on 8 February. The event is commemorated by a historic marker on a ridge above the falls to the east:

"first white men to discover the river Yarra reaching Yarra Falls on 8th February, 1803. Also to make the first crossing near here with the cattle by the first overlanders John Gardiner, Joseph Hawdon and Captain John Hepburn in December 1836."

=== Use as a power source ===
In 1839, John Dight, a flour miller previously based in Campell Town, New South Wales, purchased a block of land next to the falls and in 1841, built a water-powered mill there. He built a small weir on the natural bar of basalt boulders to regulate water for the water wheel. The property changed hands several times over the decades until the mill was destroyed by fire in the early 1900s. The site remains one of Melbourne's oldest and most significant industrial sites; and, as of 1999, consisted of the remains of the head race, tail race, turbine house, retaining wall, and weir.

The weir was upgraded in 1895 for the Melbourne Flour Milling Company, which had acquired the former Yarra Falls Roller Mill, which were the largest capacity water-power system in Victoria at the time of construction, and technically Victoria's first hydro-electric plant. It underwent reconstruction work in 1918, 1940, and 1967, following damaging floods.

At the instigation of William Guilfoyle, director of the Royal Botanic Gardens, the Dight's Falls Pumping Station was built and opened in 1891 under the direction of William Thwaites. The pumping station was located just below the weir on the opposite side of the Yarra to avoid competition with the privately-owned mill. The Dight's Falls Pumping Scheme supplied much-needed fresh water to the Alexandra Gardens and Royal Botanic Gardens in the Domain Parklands. The Dights Falls Scheme was the Garden's primary source of fresh water from the 1890s to the 1930s and was key in ensuring the survival of the Gardens when other sources proved unreliable.

From 1893, water from the scheme was used by the Melbourne Hydraulic Power Company to power lifts in the city centre, enabling the early construction of Melbourne's distinctive tall buildings. The former mill was added to the Victorian Heritage Register on 20 August 1982 in recognition of its social, historical, archaeological, scientific and technical significance.

=== Modern history ===
With the eventual transition to mains water at the Gardens and electric lifts in City buildings, the pumping station was decommissioned and demolished in 1964.

In 1993, Melbourne Water recognised that the weir was a major obstacle to fish migration up the Yarra River, and installed a fish ladder. Subsequent research found it "is not functioning adequately and will require modifications to improve its efficiency and effectiveness". To address the issue, between 2010 and 2012, Melbourne Water replaced the weir and constructed a new fishway.

== Contemporary use ==
Walmer Street Bridge
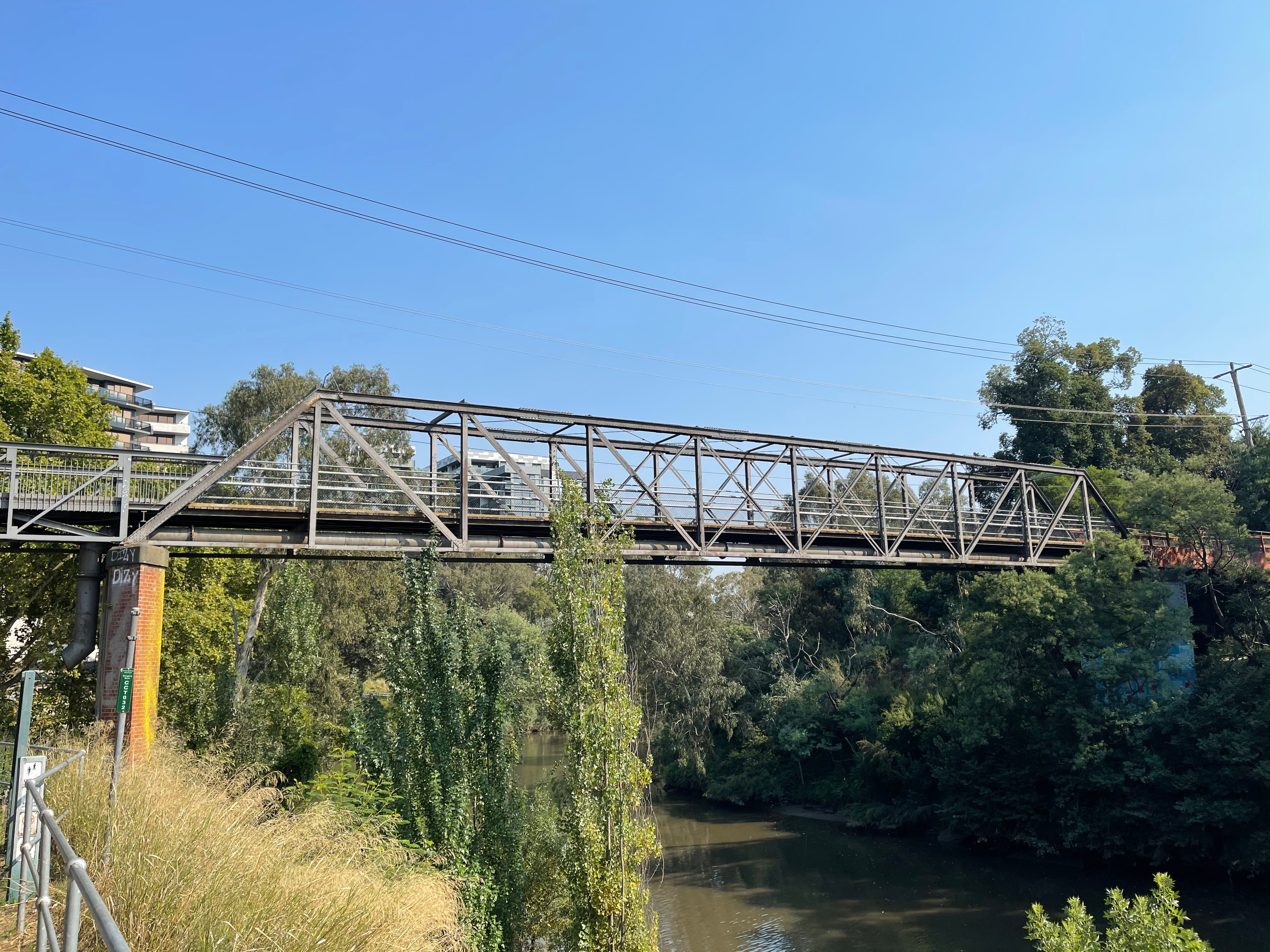
- Eastern side of the bridge
- Coordinates: 37°47′50″S 145°00′03″E
- Carries: Main Yarra Trail; Aqueduct (historical)
- Crosses: Yarra River
- Locale: Richmond (west)
- Begins: Kew (east)
- Preceded by: Fairfield Pipe Bridge
- Followed by: Victoria Bridge

Characteristics
- Design: Pratt truss
- Material: Wrought iron
- Pier construction: Brick

History
- Designer: William Thwaites
- Opened: 1891; 135 years ago

Victorian Heritage Register
- Official name: Walmer Street Bridge
- Type: Registered place
- Criteria: a.
- Designated: 7 January 2021
- Reference no.: VHR H2401
- Categories: Utilities - Water; Transport - Road

Location
- Interactive map of Walmer Street Bridge

Located approximately 1.65 kilometres (1 mi) to the south of the falls is the Walmer Street Bridge, a former aqueduct that is a surviving remnant of the Dights Falls Scheme. Designed by William Thwaites and completed in 1891, the wrought iron Pratt truss girder bridge is no longer in use as an aqueduct and was converted for contemporary use as part of the Yarra River Trail, connecting Abbotsford with Kew within the Yarra Bend Park. The former aqueduct was added to the Victorian Heritage Register on 7 January 2021 in recognition of its historical significance.

The Dights Falls rapid is often used for canoeing, and has been used many times for the Victorian Canoe Slalom Championships.

Magpies occupy the area, and it is said that the Collingwood Football Club's use of the magpie mascot was inspired by the magpies at Dights Falls.

== Gallery ==
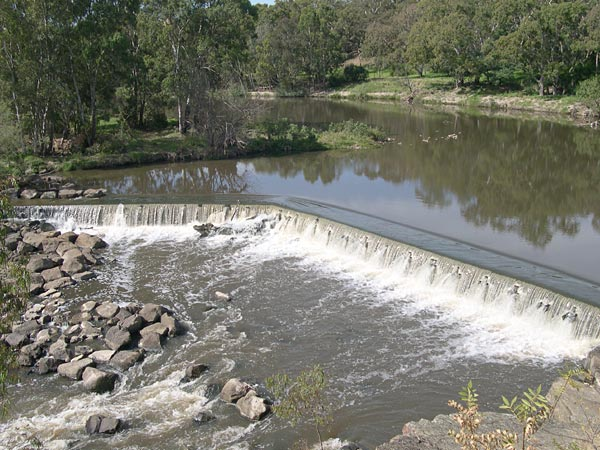
The falls at Abbotsford

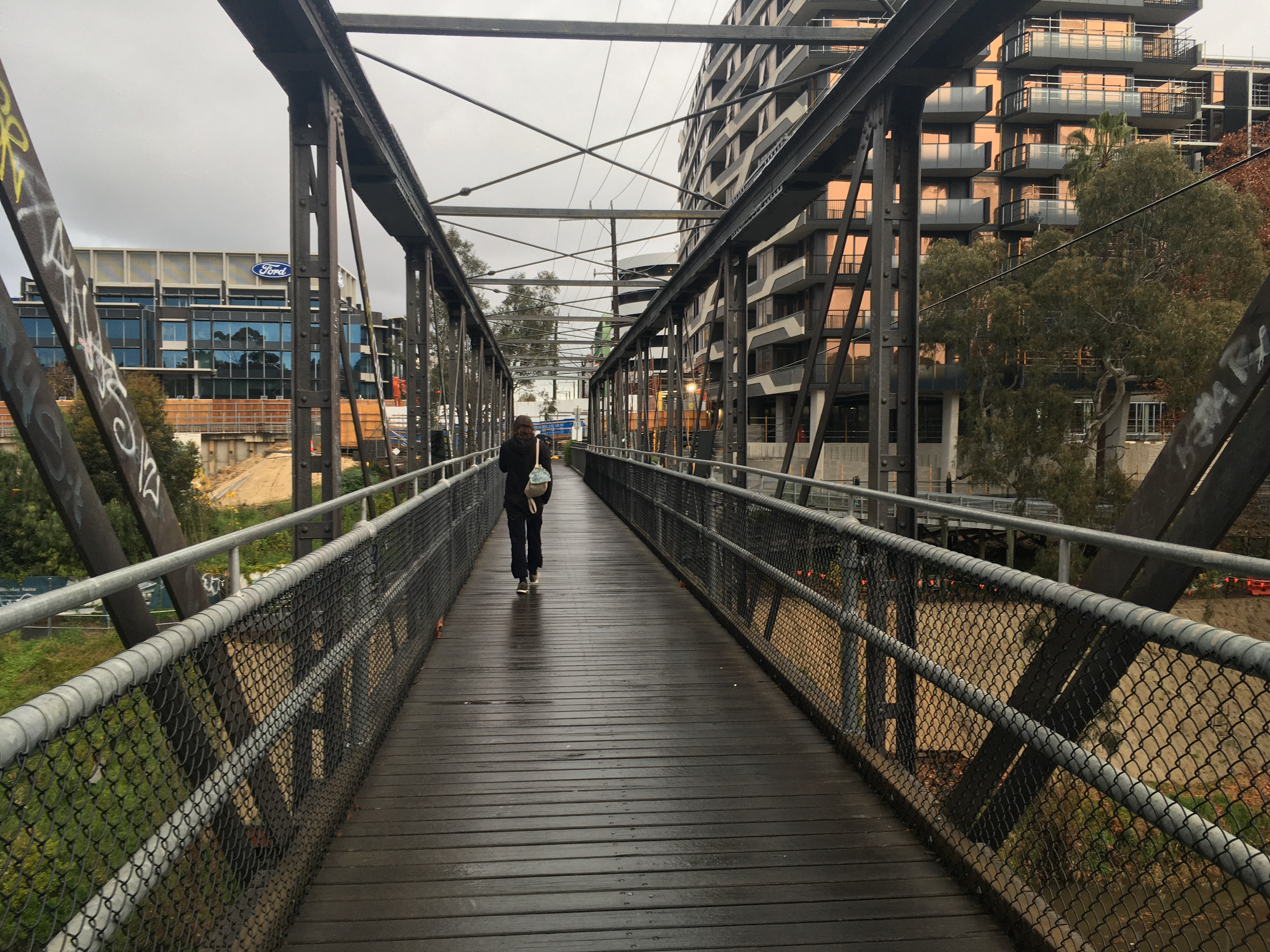
Pedestrian on the bridge, looking south

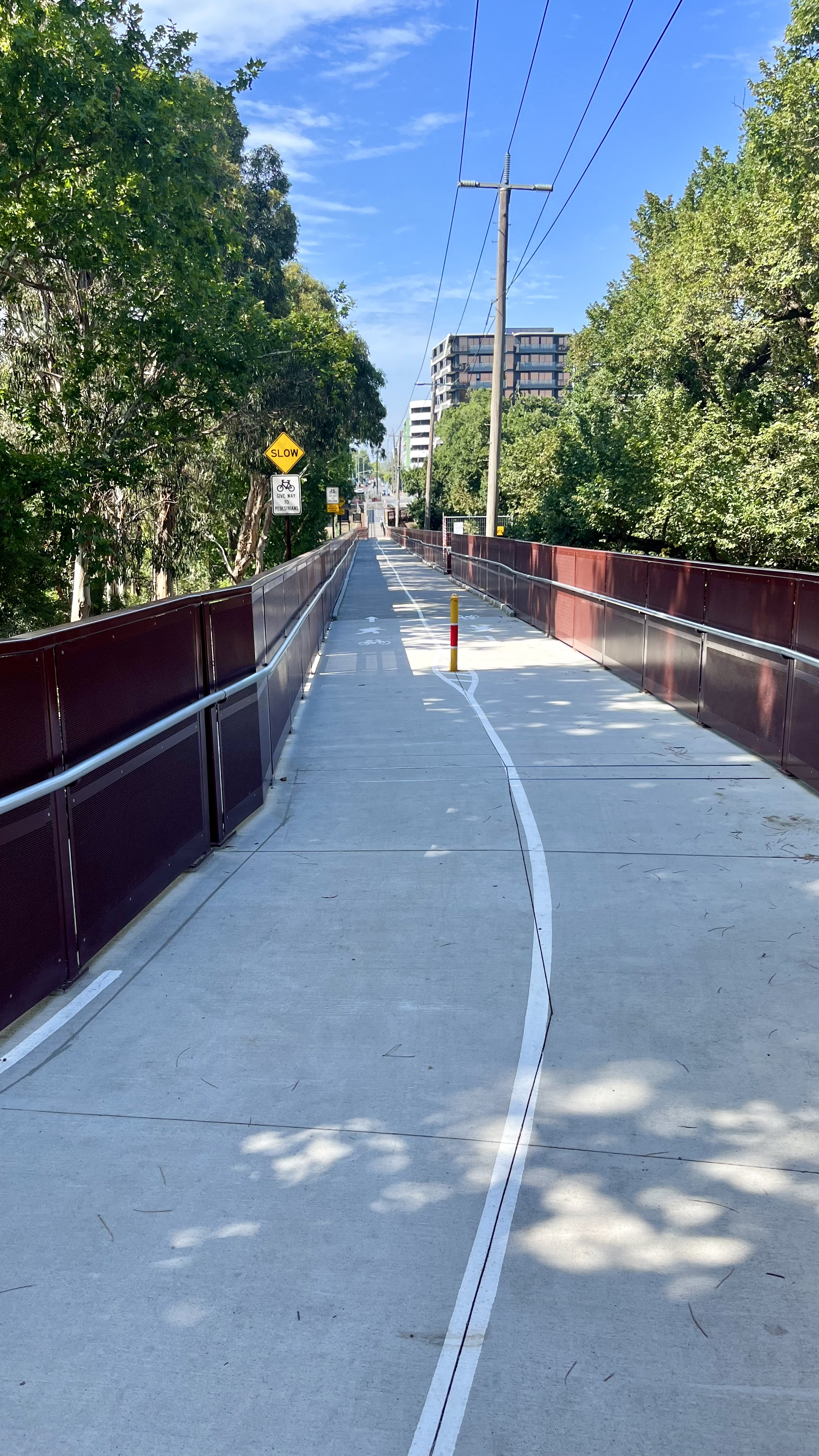
Surface of the Trail, 2024

== See also ==
- Crossings of the Yarra River
- List of reservoirs and dams in Victoria
- List of heritage-listed buildings in Melbourne

Next crossing upstream	Yarra River	Next crossing downstream
Fairfield Pipe Bridge (pedestrians; cyclists)	Walmer Street Bridge	Victoria Bridge (trams; vehicles; pedestrians; cyclists)
