= Western Treatment Plant =

Ramsar site and sewage treatment plant in Victoria, Australia

- Metropolitan Sewage Farm; Werribee Sewage Farm; Werribee Poo Farm
- A lagoon within a restricted-access area of the plant/wetlands complex, with black swans (Cygnus atratus) and Australian swamphens (Porphyrio melanotus melanotus), 2024

- Location of the plant on the fringe of Greater Metropolitan Melbourne
- Interactive map of Western Treatment Plant
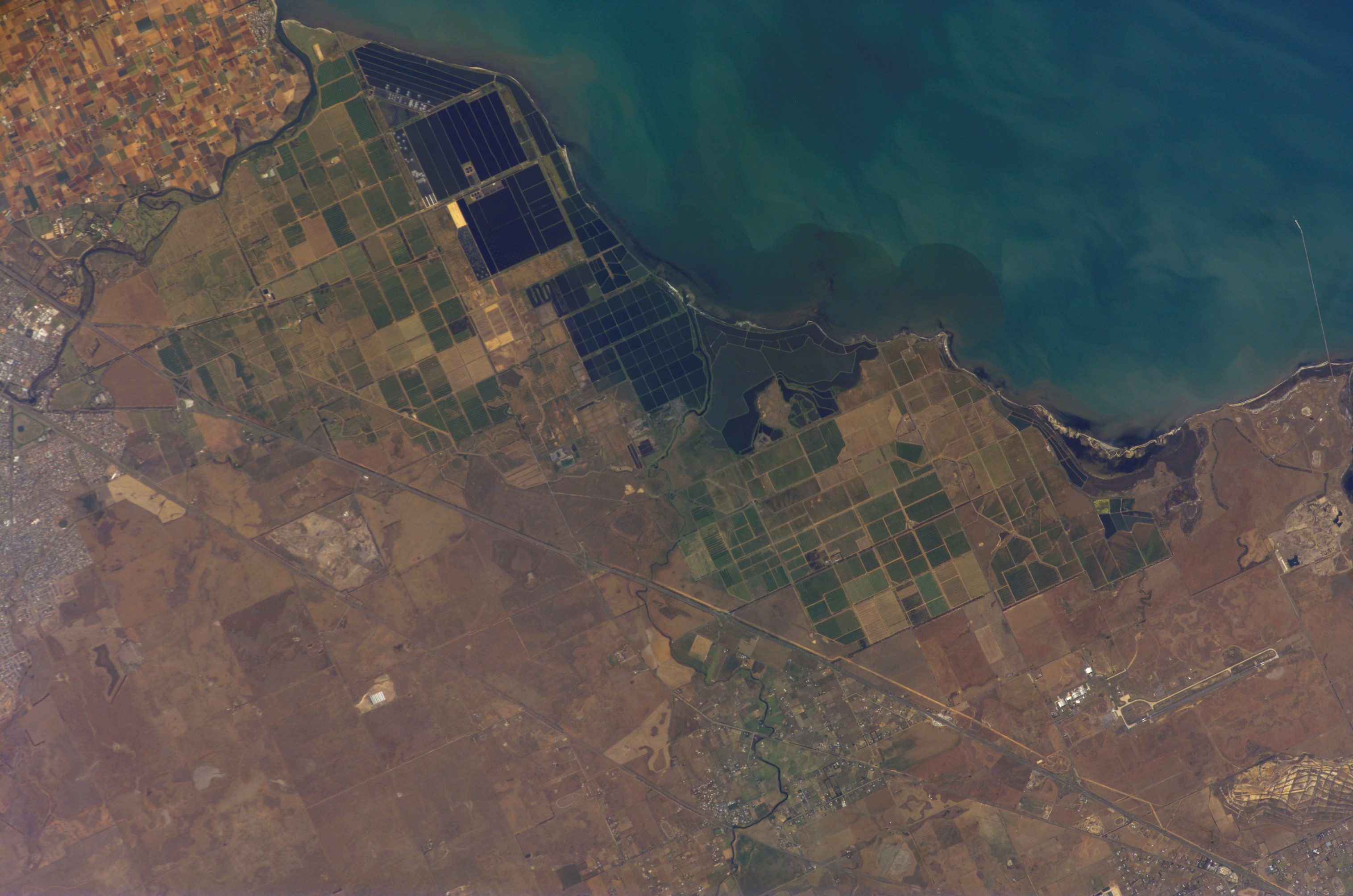
- Satellite image of the plant, 2007
- Location: Cocoroc, City of Wyndham, Melbourne, Victoria
- Coordinates: 38°00′S 144°34′E
- Type: Sewage treatment plant; wetlands
- Primary inflows: Pumped sewerage via the Western Trunk Sewer
- Basin countries: Australia
- Managing agency: Melbourne Water
- Designation: Ramsar wetland site
- Built: 1897; 129 years ago by the Melbourne and Metropolitan Board of Works
- Construction engineer: James Mansergh; William Thwaites
- Surface area: 110 square kilometres (42 sq mi)

The Western Treatment Plant, formerly the Metropolitan Sewage Farm or, more commonly and informally, the Werribee Sewage Farm or Werribee Poo Farm, is a 110-square-kilometre (42 sq mi) sewage treatment plant, located in Cocoroc, in the City of Wyndham, in the south-western suburbs of Melbourne, Victoria, Australia. The plant is approximately 30 kilometres (19 mi) southwest of the Melbourne city centre, on the coast of Port Phillip Bay.

The plant was completed in 1897 by the Melbourne and Metropolitan Board of Works (MMBW), and is currently operated by Melbourne Water. The plant's land is bordered by the Werribee River to the east, the Princes Freeway to the north, and Avalon Airport to the west. It forms part of the Port Phillip Bay (Western Shoreline) and Bellarine Peninsula Ramsar Site as a wetland of international importance. The Western Treatment Plant treats around fifty percent of Melbourne's sewage (Note: The Eastern Treatment Plant treats 40%.) — about 485 megalitres or 393 acre-feet per day — and generates almost 40,000 megalitres or 32,000 acre-feet of recycled water a year.

== History ==
=== The need for a solution ===
The discovery of gold in Victoria in 1851 led to Bendigo becoming the richest city in the world at the time and therefore, Melbourne with a population of about 500,000 by the 1880s, also Australia's most populous.

The rapidly expanding metropolis faced an increasing pollution problem. While it was described by British journalists as "Marvellous Melbourne" and "a city of magnificent intentions", it was also being dubbed "Marvellous Smellbourne" because of its primitive and unsanitary waste disposal methods. The majority of waste water from industries and homes, including chamber pots and overflowing cesspits, ran into street channels and open drains which emptied into rivers and creeks, turning them into open sewers. As a consequence, cholera and typhoid were rife.

=== Conception and planning ===
In 1888, a Royal Commission was formed to come up with a solution to Melbourne's waste problems. The Commission's findings led to an ambitious plan for the construction of a sewerage system - a system of pipes, sewers and drains built underground to carry sewage from homes and factories to a sewage treatment farm.

In 1892, the newly established Melbourne and Metropolitan Board of Works (MMBW) began buying land at Werribee, chosen for its low rainfall and suitable soils. The Western Treatment Plant, then known as Werribee Farm, began operations in 1897.

Eminent British engineer James Mansergh was appointed to advise on a suitable system, while local engineer William Thwaites was ultimately responsible for the design and implementation of the system. At a time when most cities dumped their untreated wastes directly into rivers and the sea, Mansergh advised treatment of Melbourne's sewage by broad irrigation with a capacity large enough able to deal with the expansion in population expected over fifty years. The system he conceived and which was implemented in only slightly modified form began with a water closet at every property which delivered the sewage by gravity through a network of underground sewers of increasing diameter to a steam pumping station at Spotswood where it was forced up wrought iron rising mains to Brooklyn to begin its 25-kilometre (16 mi) journey along the Main Outfall Sewer to the sewage farm at Werribee.

=== Main Outfall Sewer ===
Main Outfall Sewer
- Sanitary sewer
- Features: Three brick-arched aqueducts
- Design: James Mansergh; William Thwaites
- Builder: Melbourne and Metropolitan Board of Works
- Constructed: 1892–1894
- Completed: 1894; 132 years ago
- Demolished: 1993 (decommissioned)
- Cost: £240,748
- Length: 25 km (16 mi)
- Architectural style: Victorian
- Owner: Melbourne and Metropolitan Board of Works (1892–1992); Melbourne Water (1992–2005); VicRoads (since 2005– )
- Location: Brimbank, Hobsons Bay, and Wyndham local government areas, Melbourne, Victoria, Australia
- Location of the sewer in Greater Metropolitan Melbourne
- Interactive map of Main Outfall Sewer
- Coordinates: 37°49′18″S 144°50′33″E

Site notes
- Material: Bricks; concrete

Victorian Heritage Register
- Official name: Main Outfall Sewer
- Type: Registered place
- Designated: 13 September 2001
- Reference no.: H1932
- Heritage overlay no.: HO13; HO169; HO26
- Category: Utilities - Sewerage

The Main Outfall Sewer is a 25-kilometre-long (16 mi) sanitary sewer, constructed between 1892 and 1894, and was a vital link in the sewerage system of Melbourne. When it was constructed in the 1890s, it was the largest civil engineering project undertaken in Victoria. The sewer was constructed by seven contractors who employed 1,300 workers and cost £240,748. The Main Outfall Sewer consists of a semicircular brick or concrete-lined channel – in places arched over to form a circular tunnel with an earth covering – and three brick-arched aqueducts. The concrete and brick open and covered sewer is a fine example of the technology of the period, exhibiting a high level of integrity. The three major red brick aqueducts over the Kororoit and Skeleton creeks, and the Werribee River are excellent examples of multi-spanned, arched masonry bridges.

The sewer runs from the old steam pumping station at Spotswood, now part of Scienceworks Museum, to the Western Treatment Plant, and spans the suburbs of Brooklyn, Laverton North, Williams Landing, Hoppers Crossing, and Werribee in the cities of Brimbank, Hobsons Bay and Wyndham. The Main Outfall Sewer was decommissioned in 1993 and its former functions were replaced by the Western Trunk Sewer.

Built on the traditional lands of the Wurundjeri people, the sewer was added to the Victorian Heritage Register on 13 September 2001 in recognition of its historical and scientific (engineering) significance.

In 2005, management of the former sewer was transferred from Melbourne Water to VicRoads to facilitate the development of the Federation Trail, a 23-kilometre (14 mi) cycling and pedestrian trail, that runs mostly alongside the Main Outfall Sewer. Parts of the former sewer were repurposed as parklands.

=== Upgrades ===
In 1996, a Port Phillip Bay Environmental Study by the CSIRO found that Port Phillip Bay could be damaged if nitrogen loads entering its waters continued to increase, and thus recommended a reduction in nitrogen loads going into the bay. In 2004, Melbourne Water completed a $160 million upgrade of the plant to reduce nitrogen loads. Recycled water irrigation replaced sewage irrigation across the site. Land and grass filtration methods previously used were stopped.

=== General ===
Most of the Federation Trail, a major arterial pedestrian and bicycle path that runs for 23-kilometres from Werribee to Altona North, follows the heritage-listed Main Outfall Sewer.

"Greening the Pipeline" is a project aimed to transform approximately the pipeline into a 40-metre (43 yd) wide parkland in Melbourne's western suburbs to connect its communities. The pilot stage will be a 100m section in Williams Landing.

== Sewage treatment ==
=== System of treatment ===
There are three modern lagoon systems at the Western Treatment Plant. A modern lagoon is typically made up of 10 large ponds, each of which can hold around 600 million litres of water. Sewage flows slowly through these ponds, allowing bacteria to break down the organic material. The water progressively becomes cleaner as it flows through each of the ponds. Two main types of ponds are used in lagoon treatment - anaerobic (without oxygen) and aerobic (with oxygen) - both producing different types of bacteria needed to break down the sewage.

=== Electricity from biogas and odour control ===
Using huge covers over the ponds, methane gas produced as a by-product of sewage treatment (known as biogas) is captured and turned into renewable energy. The Western Treatment Plant generates 70,000 MWh annually which means that it sometimes exceeds its own need for electricity and exports it back to the grid. Capturing and using biogas to generate electricity also means greenhouse gas and odour emissions are significantly reduced. Around 90% of odour emissions from the Western Treatment Plant have been cut since the first methane covers were installed in 1992.

=== Water recycling ===
A water recycling disinfection plant was built at the Western Treatment Plant in 2004. This plant treats Class C recycled water to Class A standard which means this water is suitable for a greater number of uses. In 2010/11, about 29.972 billion litres of recycled water was supplied from the Western Treatment Plant. Of this, about 28.051 billion litres of recycled water (mostly Class C) was used to irrigate 85 km^{2} of pasture for grazing 15,000 cattle and 40,000 sheep and manage soil salinity onsite, and to maintain the health of the Ramsar listed wetlands. A further 1.921 billion litres of recycled water (Class A) was supplied to Southern Rural Water and City West Water for offsite customers, such as the Werribee market garden area to grow vegetables, and to local councils to irrigate sports grounds, parks and gardens.

The remaining treated effluent is discharged into Port Phillip Bay under an accredited EPA Victoria licence.

== Environment ==
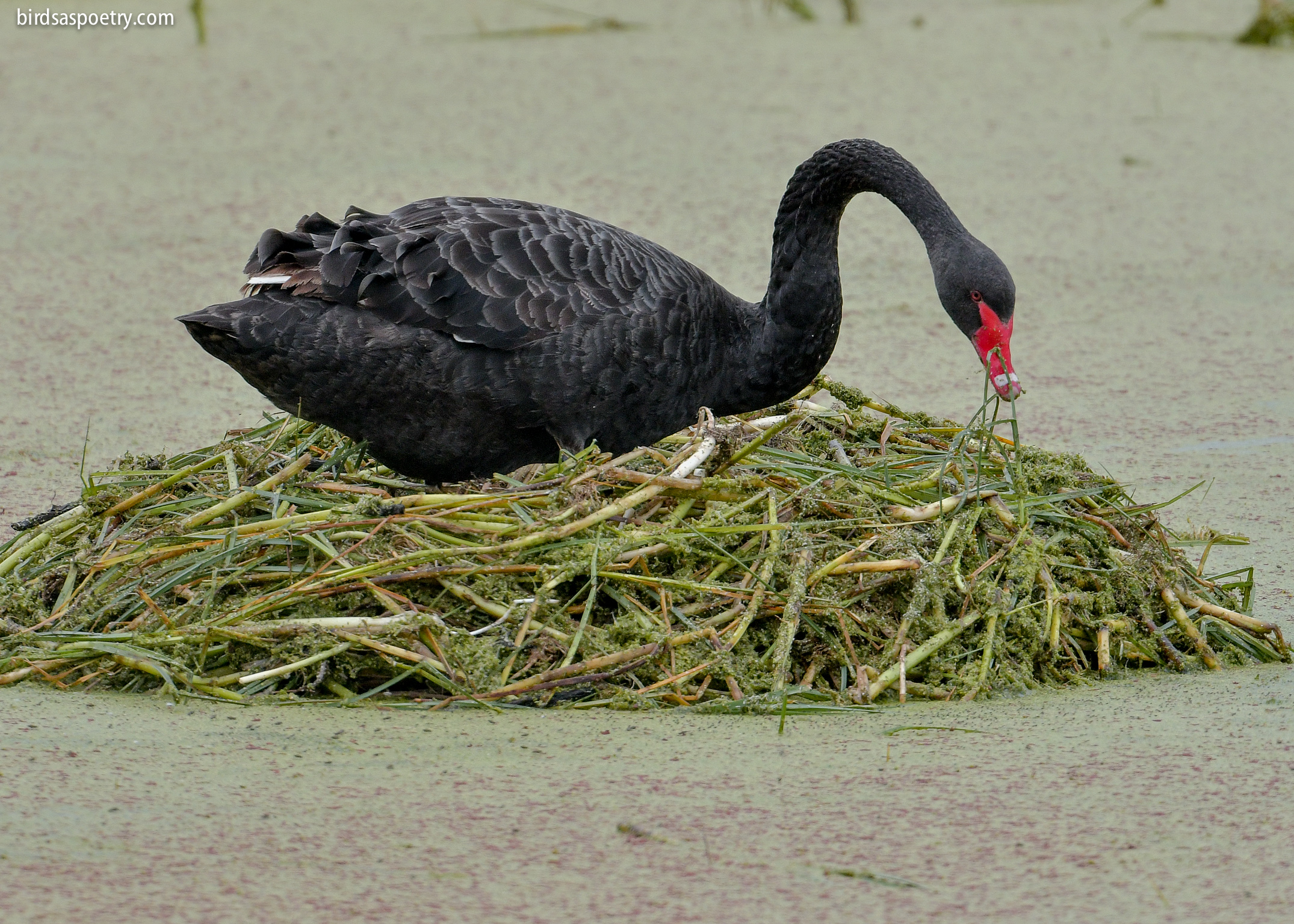
Black swan (Cygnus atratus) nesting at the Western Treatment Plant

In 1921 parts of Port Phillip Bay and Bellarine Peninsula including the Western Treatment Plant were declared a sanctuary for native animals. In 1983 the plant was declared a Ramsar site, internationally recognised for its wetland habitat especially for waterfowl.

The Western Treatment Plant is one of Australia's best-known sites for recreational birding, with about 270 species of birds recorded there. On the south-western boundary lies the 1550 ha Murtcaim Wildlife Area, containing one of the last unmodified areas of saltmarsh on Port Phillip. The sewage treatment lagoons, Lake Borrie, creeks, saltmarsh, and coast host large numbers of sedentary and migratory waterbirds and waders. It adjoins the Spit Nature Conservation Reserve and is one of the few wintering sites for the critically endangered orange-bellied parrot. Access to the Western Treatment Plant for birdwatching is by permit only; permits can be obtained from Melbourne Water. The site is part of the Werribee and Avalon Important Bird Area, identified as such by BirdLife International because of its importance for waterbirds as well as for orange-bellied parrots.

== See also ==
- Eastern Treatment Plant
- Altona Treatment Plant
- List of Ramsar sites in Australia
