= Port Phillip Bay (Western Shoreline) and Bellarine Peninsula Ramsar Site =

Wetland of international importance in Victoria, Australia

Coordinates: 38°04′S 144°36′E

Designations

Ramsar Wetland
- Official name: Port Phillip Bay & Bellarine Peninsula
- Designated: 15 December 1982
- Reference no.: 266

The Port Phillip Bay (Western Shoreline) and Bellarine Peninsula Ramsar Site is one of the Australian sites listed under the Ramsar Convention as a wetland of international importance. It was designated on 15 December 1982, and is listed as Ramsar Site No.266. Much of the site is also part of either the Swan Bay and Port Phillip Bay Islands Important Bird Area or the Werribee and Avalon Important Bird Area, identified as such by BirdLife International because of their importance for wetland and waterbirds as well as for orange-bellied parrots. It comprises some six disjunct, largely coastal, areas of land, totalling 229 km^{2}, along the western shore of Port Phillip and on the Bellarine Peninsula, in the state of Victoria. Wetland types protected include shallow marine waters, estuaries, freshwater lakes, seasonal swamps, intertidal mudflats and seagrass beds.

The subsites include:

- Part of Point Cook, including the coastline from Skeleton Creek to the Point Cook Coastal Park
- Much of the Western Treatment Plant, as well as the adjacent Spit Nature Conservation Reserve and Avalon Airfield
- A strip of coastline on the north shore of Corio Bay, including Point Wilson, Point Lillias and Limeburners Bay
- Swan Bay at the eastern end of the Bellarine Peninsula
- Mud Islands in western Port Phillip
- The Lake Connewarre wetland complex, including Lake Connewarre, Reedy Lake, Murtnaghurt Lagoon and the Barwon River estuary in the south-western Bellarine Peninsula

== Environment ==
=== Flora ===
Collectively, the various parts of the Ramsar site support 579 species of non-marine plants, of which about 40% (247 species) are non-indigenous. The list includes three nationally threatened species and 22 Victorian threatened species. One of the nationally threatened plants is the spiny rice-flower (Pimelea spinescens), recorded at the Western Treatment Plant.

=== Fauna ===
The site was designated mainly because its value as waterbird habitat was recognised as being of international importance for waders (based on supporting at least 1% of the flyway population) for 14 species – double-banded plover, red-kneed dotterel, grey plover, Pacific golden plover, banded stilt, red-necked avocet, pied oystercatcher, curlew sandpiper, red-necked stint, sharp-tailed sandpiper, eastern curlew, ruddy turnstone, common greenshank and marsh sandpiper.

All the main parts of the Ramsar site support threatened fauna, including all of the most important known wintering sites of the critically endangered orange-bellied parrot.
