= Greater Western Water =

Water corporation in Victoria, Australia

- Logo of Greater Western Water

Agency overview
- Formed: 1 July 2021
- Preceding agencies: City West Water; Western Water
- Jurisdiction: Government of Victoria
- Headquarters: 36 Macedon St, Sunbury VIC 3429
- Employees: 793
- Minister responsible: Harriet Shing, Minister for Water (Victoria)
- Agency executives: Lisa Neville, Chair of the Board; Cameron FitzGerald, Managing Director
- Parent department: Department of Energy, Environment and Climate Action - DEECA
- Website: www.gww.com.au

Greater Western Water (GWW) is a water services corporation in the state of Victoria in Australia. It is owned by the Victorian Government and was formed on 1 July 2021 by bringing together Western Water and City West Water.

GWW provides water and recycled water supply, sewerage and trade waste services to approximately 550,000 residential customers and more than 46,000 business customers. It operates across an area of 3,700 km^{2} (1,400 sq mi) stretching from Melbourne’s central business district (CBD) and inner suburbs to Little River in the south, Myrniong in the west and Lancefield in the north, reaching a population of 1.43 million.

Their service area covers the local government areas (LGAs) of Brimbank, Hobsons Bay, Maribyrnong, Melton, Moonee Valley, Wyndham and Yarra, and partially covers the LGAs of Hume, Macedon Ranges, Melbourne and Moorabool.

Greater Western Water is subject to price control regulation administered by the Essential Services Commission (Victoria). In September 2023, the company submitted its pricing proposal for the period 1 July 2024 to 30 June 2028. In its final decision in June 2024, the Essential Services Commission approved new prices for customers over the 4-year period commencing 1 July 2024.
