= Point Lillias =

Point in Victoria, Australia

Coordinates: 38°05′24″S 144°26′38″E

Point Lillias is a narrow peninsula jutting southwards from the northern coast of Corio Bay, north of the city of Geelong, in Victoria, Australia. It was formed by a southward-trending tongue of lava from the volcanic flows of the Werribee Plains. The seaward end of the peninsula forms a low cliff fringed by shelly beach ridges. Forming the end of the same lava tongue, 500 metres to the south, is a small basalt island known as Bird Rock, connected by a submerged shoal to the peninsula. Point Lillias adjoins the evaporation ponds of the Cheetham saltworks at Avalon. It is listed as a wetland of international importance under the Ramsar Convention as part of the Port Phillip Bay (Western Shoreline) and Bellarine Peninsula Ramsar Site.

== Geological significance ==
Point Lillias illustrates the development of coastal features on a lava surface. Although the adjacent coastline has developed through the submergence of the edge of the Werribee lava plain, Bird Rock is the only emergent, offshore remnant of the lava flows.

== Historical significance ==
Point Lillias has been identified as the location reached in December 1824 by the exploration party led by Hamilton Hume and William Hovell, which they incorrectly identified as the shore of Western Port. As a consequence of that error, an expedition was sent from Sydney to Western Port in November 1826, to establish a settlement there. After exploring Western Port, it became apparent to the expedition that it was not the place reached by Hume and Hovell.

== Chemical storage proposal ==
Following the 1991 fire in the Coode Island chemicals storage facility in Melbourne, and a long period of inquiry to find an alternative site, the Victorian Government recommended in 1996 that Point Lillias be the new site for the transshipment and storage of bulk liquid chemicals for the chemicals industry in Victoria. The arguments backing the recommendation were accepted by the Australian Government in 1997, and it was proposed to excise 20 hectares of the Ramsar site to build the new facility. However, later that year, the Victorian Government decided not to proceed with the move from Coode Island to Point Lillias.
