= Avalon, Victoria =

Avalon
- Suburb
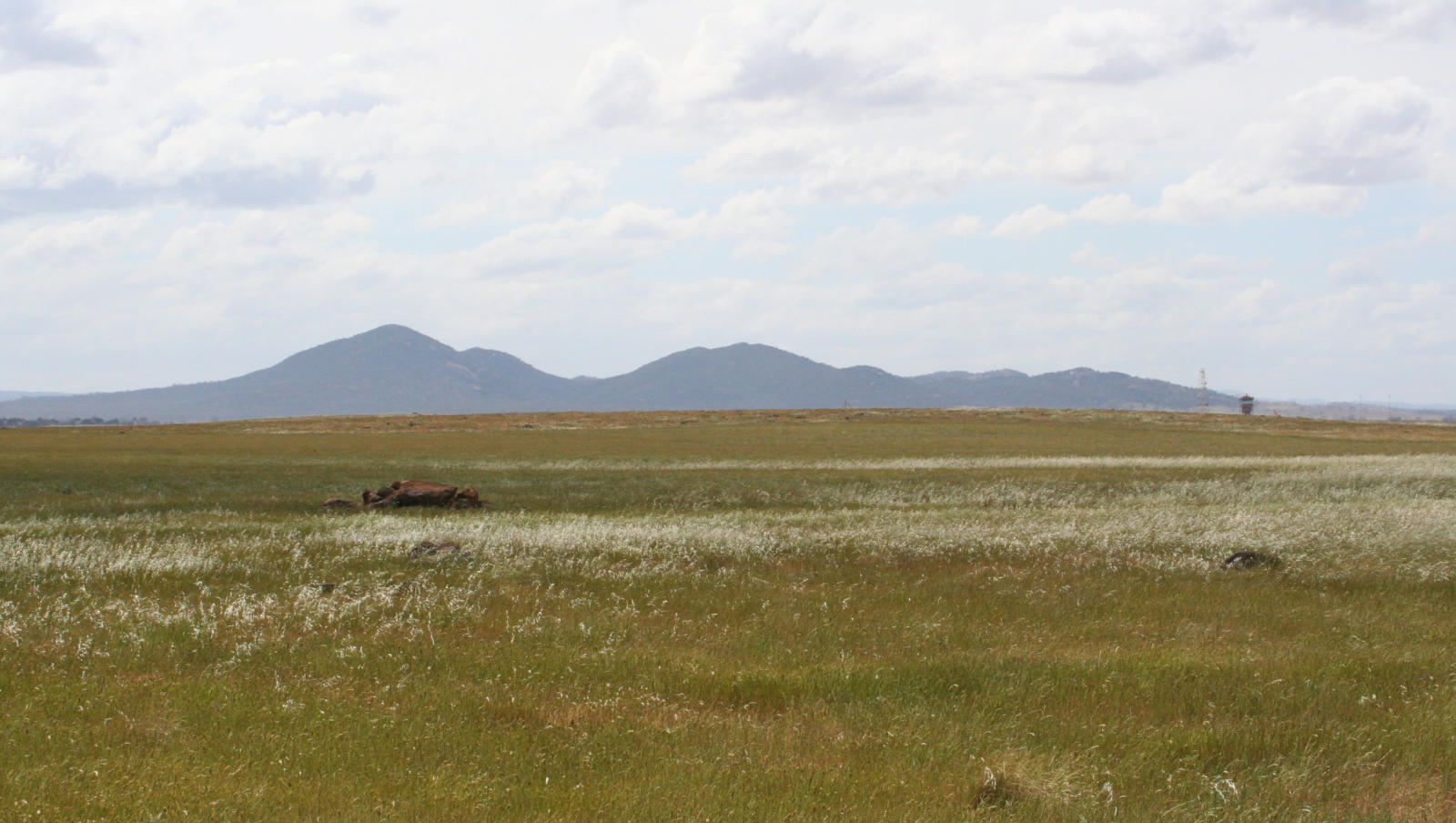
- The You Yangs viewed from near Avalon Airport

- Interactive map of Avalon
- Coordinates: 38°05′S 144°26′E
- Country: Australia
- State: Victoria
- City: Geelong
- LGA: City of Greater Geelong
- Location: 15 km (9.3 mi) from Geelong; 53 km (33 mi) from Melbourne

Government
  - State electorate: Lara
  - Federal division: Corio

Population
  - Total: 255 (2021 census)
- Postcode: 3212
Suburbs around Avalon
Lara	Lara	Little River
Lara	Avalon	Point Wilson
Corio	Corio Bay	Point Wilson

Avalon (post code: 3212) is a locality situated north east of Geelong, Victoria. Its local government area is the City of Greater Geelong and its Ward is Windermere. It is located on the northern shore of Corio Bay to the southwest of the state's capital city of Melbourne.

== Economy ==
Avalon is notable for Avalon Airport, which is the site of the biennial Australian International Airshow, the largest of its kind in the southern hemisphere. Although located on the outskirts of Geelong, the airport effectively operates as a second airport for the much larger city of Melbourne.

In 2005, businessman Lindsay Fox launched plans to attract Australia's first Disneyland theme park to the area.

When established in 2004, Jetstar had its headquarters on the grounds of Avalon Airport in Avalon, but has since relocated to the Melbourne central business district.

Major industry in the area includes a factory producing concrete railway sleepers, and the Cheetham Saltworks.

== History ==
Avalon State School opened on 7 June 1913 and closed on 6 March 1950. The land was later resumed by the Commonwealth Government for the airport, while the building and residence were moved to Corio Primary School.

== Climate ==
Climate data for Avalon (Avalon Airport) 1995–present averages, 1995–present extremes
Month	Jan	Feb	Mar	Apr	May	Jun	Jul	Aug	Sep	Oct	Nov	Dec	Year
Record high °C (°F)	46.3 (115.3)	47.9 (118.2)	42.0 (107.6)	36.1 (97.0)	28.0 (82.4)	23.6 (74.5)	22.5 (72.5)	26.6 (79.9)	31.3 (88.3)	37.8 (100.0)	41.8 (107.2)	45.8 (114.4)	47.9 (118.2)
Mean daily maximum °C (°F)	26.6 (79.9)	26.1 (79.0)	24.3 (75.7)	20.5 (68.9)	17.3 (63.1)	14.7 (58.5)	14.2 (57.6)	15.4 (59.7)	17.7 (63.9)	20.2 (68.4)	22.4 (72.3)	24.5 (76.1)	20.4 (68.7)
Mean daily minimum °C (°F)	14.3 (57.7)	14.4 (57.9)	12.7 (54.9)	9.8 (49.6)	7.6 (45.7)	5.8 (42.4)	5.1 (41.2)	5.6 (42.1)	6.7 (44.1)	8.1 (46.6)	10.5 (50.9)	11.9 (53.4)	9.4 (48.9)
Record low °C (°F)	4.5 (40.1)	6.8 (44.2)	2.9 (37.2)	0.6 (33.1)	−1.3 (29.7)	−2.9 (26.8)	−4.0 (24.8)	−4.4 (24.1)	−1.7 (28.9)	0.1 (32.2)	2.6 (36.7)	4.6 (40.3)	−4.4 (24.1)
Average rainfall mm (inches)	31.1 (1.22)	35.0 (1.38)	24.8 (0.98)	39.8 (1.57)	32.4 (1.28)	40.5 (1.59)	36.1 (1.42)	38.3 (1.51)	40.2 (1.58)	40.9 (1.61)	50.7 (2.00)	28.5 (1.12)	439.2 (17.29)
Average rainy days (≥ 0.2 mm)	6.0	5.7	6.7	9.7	11.9	13.8	15.4	15.2	13.6	12.0	9.9	8.5	128.4
Average afternoon relative humidity (%)	50	49	49	56	64	68	66	62	58	53	54	53	57
Source 1: Bureau of Meteorology, Avalon Airport (1991–2020)
Source 2: Bureau of Meteorology, Avalon Airport (all years)

== Population ==
In the 2021 Census, there were 255 people in Avalon. 71.8% of people were born in Australia and 72.5% of people only spoke English at home. The most common response for religion was No Religion at 52.2%.

== Recreation ==
Avalon Raceway is a dirt track racing venue located in the area.

In 2010 the Confederation of Australian Motor Sport was granted funding for a feasibility study to build a world class motorsports facility in the area, with the $200 million race circuit intended to become the home of the Australian Formula 1 Grand Prix after the contract to host the race at Albert Park expired in 2015. However this did not eventuate. In April 2023 the Government of Victoria announced it intended to build a new motorsport complex in Avalon.

== See also ==
- Avalon Raceway
- Avalon Airport
