= Melbourne Harbor Trust =

Former port authority of Melbourne

Coordinates: 37.819°S 144.960°E

The Melbourne Harbor Trust was established in 1877 to improve and operate port facilities for the growing city of Melbourne. It was superseded by the Port of Melbourne Authority in 1978 and later by the Port of Melbourne Corporation.

== Creation ==
In the 1860s and 1870s, agitation for the establishment of a trust on the lines of those on the Mersey at Liverpool, and especially the Clyde Navigation Trust (which was run by Glasgow's leading merchants), came predominantly from the Melbourne Chamber of Commerce. However, Williamstown and Geelong interests opposed the measure, while Alfred Clark (the member of parliament for Williamstown) warned "...if ships were to be taken up the river then grass will grow on the piers and streets of Williamstown." The trust reflected Melbourne mercantile interests but the government was hostile towards it.

At the time there was little coordinated management or development of Melbourne ports facilities, with a variety of privately built wharves and jetties constructed along the Yarra River, as well as piers at Port Melbourne (formerly known as Sandridge) and Williamstown. Vessel movements and berthings, navigational aids, and wharfage rates, were the responsibility of the Ports and Harbours Branch under the Department of Trade and Customs.

The trust was created after several boards of inquiry into means to improve access for shipping to Melbourne, and the Melbourne Harbor Trust Act 1876 (40 Vict. No. 552) was finally passed. The first appointment of fifteen commissioners, who represented various interests in the port, was on 30 March 1877, with a meeting on 11 April 1877 to elect office bearers: James Lorimer being appointed the trust's first chairman.

British engineer, Sir John Coode, was commissioned to advise on port improvements. Coode produced a scheme involving a large dock basin (Victoria Dock) and bypassing a large bend in the river through a new cut, now known as the Coode Canal. However, the works could not commence until 1883 when a coalition government united the previously opposing groups. Under Coode's Plan, heavily modified by the trust's own engineer, Joseph Brady, the Yarra was deepened and cleared of obstructions, and the Coode Canal was excavated, opening in 1886. Excavation of Victoria Dock was underway in 1891, opening in 1896. The trust also undertook the filling of the Sandridge Lagoon and dredging the deep-water channel to the Port Melbourne piers. Dock construction under the original harbour trust scheme continued into the 1920s.

By 1927 the trust was employing more than 1,000 men, and was the eighth largest deep-water port in the British Empire. After 1945 new facilities were developed downstream, including Appleton (1956), Webb (1960) and Swanson (1969) docks, each of which was named after chairman of the trust – William Thomas Appleton (1859–1930), chairman 5 April 1911 to 22 January 1913; John Percival Webb OBE chairman from 27 May 1941 to 31 August 1971; and Victor Swanson from 1960 to 1972.

Other commissioners and chairmen included the following:

- Sir William Murray Mcpherson 1902-05-30 – 1913-01-22 & 1913-02-04 – 1914-02-20
- William Thomas Appleton 1906-11-28 – 1913-01-22 & 1913-02-04 – 1930-02-16 Chairman 1911-04-05 – 1913-01-22
- James Arthur Boyd 1913-02-04 – 1941-04-12
- Henry Meeks 1914-02-21 – 1922-08-06
- William Andrews 1922-08-15 – 1924-09-01
- Francis Duncan 1924-09-09 – 1951-01-22
- George Kermode Chairman 1934-08-29 – 1940-06-30
- Charles A Phayer 1937-02-04 – 1947-06-30
- Aubrey Duncan Mckenzie Chairman 1940-07-01 – 1960-03-03
- John Percival Webb Chairman 1941-05-27 – 1971-08-31
- Albert George Allnutt 1947-07-01 – 1950-06-30

== Functions ==
The purpose of the trust was ...to provide for the Regulation, Management and Improvement of the Port of Melbourne and certain portions of the River Yarra Yarra and certain portions of the Saltwater River....[including the regulation of the trade of the port with respect to such matters as landing of shipping of merchandise, arrivals and departures of vessels, wharfage rates...management of port facilities, [and] improvements to the port.

== Development and reconstitution ==
Two additional commissioners were appointed on 14 November 1883. Until 1900 the Melbourne Harbor Trust Commissioners were responsible to the Commissioner of Trade and Customs, and afterwards to the Minister for Public Works. There was a major reconstitution of the trust in 1913 whereby seventeen elected commissioners were replaced with five commissioners appointed by the Governor-in-Council. These five included a full-time Chairman and four representatives of ship owners, exporters, importers and primary producers. The trust also gained responsibility for the railway piers at Port Melbourne and Williamstown from 1 December 1913, bringing all the wharves, piers and jetties within the Port of Melbourne under the one authority. A sixth commissioner was appointed to represent port workers in 1954, perhaps indicating the growing influence of the Dockworkers Union.

== Port of Melbourne Authority ==
The trust was reorganised in 1978 to form the Port of Melbourne Authority, in line with modern organizational naming practice around the world, although its functions did not change greatly. It moved from its grand 1930 Market Street head office to the World Trade Centre (Melbourne) in 1983. Subsequent restructuring in 1997 saw the Melbourne Port Corporation take over property and assets, the Victorian Channels Authority berthing responsibilities, and Melbourne Port Services privatised and put out to tender. The Port of Melbourne Corporation was formed on 1 July 2003, taking over the Melbourne Port Corporation, and the Victorian Channels Authority.

== Facilities ==
Maintenance workshops erected in Williamstown.

The trust operated a series of dredges including:

- Bunyip 1879–
- G. Ward Cole Iron screw dredging steamer c1890
- Pioneer sand dredge c1940s
- John Nimmo 1887–1931
- Sir William McPherson 1912–1949
- Melbourne
- D. Mclennan 1925–1949
- George Kermode Twin screw Steam bucket dredge 1941–1976
- Mathew Flinders Cutter suction Dredge c1960-1985

The North and South Wharves were extended downstream, and in the 1930s–1950s Appleton Dock was reconstructed and extended, followed by Swanson Dock, and Webb Dock.

== Arms ==
Coat of arms of Melbourne Harbor Trust
| Notes Granted 5 March 1963. Crest Out of a coronet composed of eight masts each with sail set and upon a rim Or in front of a bollard proper two anchors in saltire Azure. Escutcheon Azure a representation of the constellation of the Southern Cross Argent on a chief enarched Or five pallets of the first. Supporters On either side a sea horse (Hippocampus) Or collared and lined Gules in front of a representation of the Melbourne Harbour front Proper. Motto Prosperity Through Service |

== Other sources ==
- The engineering of the Port of Melbourne, Peter Milner, 6th National Conference on engineering Heritage 1992.
- Jubilee history of the Melbourne Harbor Trust: compiled from the original records of the Trust and from the Victorian Hansard, Benjamin Hoare, 1927, Melbourne Harbor Trust Commissioners Jubilee Report.
- Port of Melbourne, 1835–1976 Olaf Ruhen, 1976
- Review of the organisational structure of the Melbourne Harbor Trust, John S. Taylor, 1975 Thesis (MBA)--University of Melbourne, 1975. Typescript (photocopy) ...At Baillieu Library
- The development of the Port of Melbourne 1877–1971 Sanay Yarnasarn, Thesis : 1974
