= Queenscliff Lighthouse =

Queenscliff Lighthouse may refer to either of two lighthouses in Queenscliff, Victoria, Australia:

- Queenscliff High Light, also known as the Queenscliff Black Lighthouse
- Queenscliff Low Light, also known as the Queenscliff White Lighthouse
