= Point Lonsdale Lighthouse =

Lighthouse in Victoria, Australia

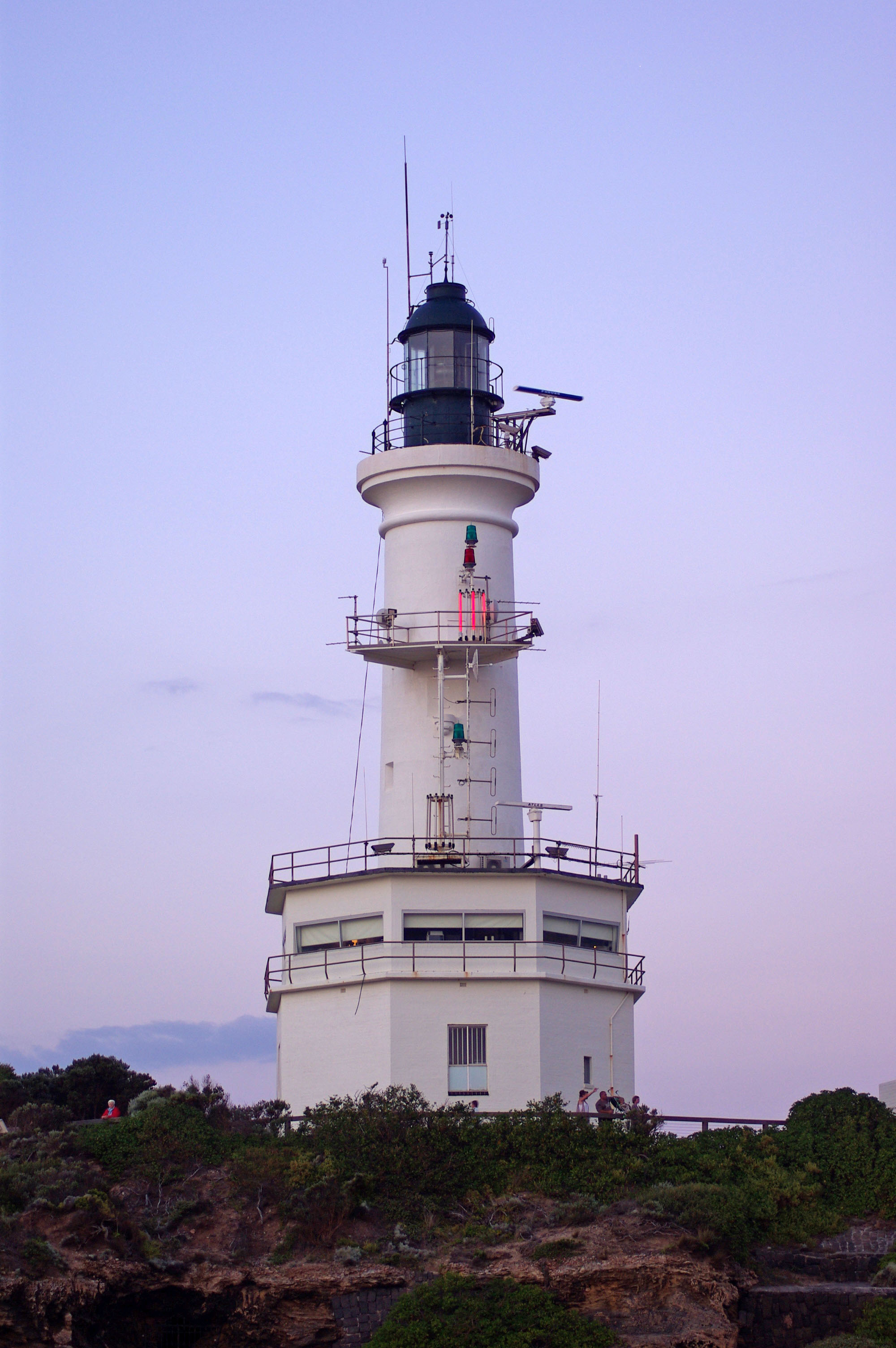
- Point Lonsdale Lighthouse
- Location: Entrance to Port Phillip Bay; Victoria; Australia
- Coordinates: 38°17′31″S 144°36′50″E

Tower
- Construction: concrete tower on octagonal prism signal station and observation room
- Automated: 1999
- Height: 21.3 metres (70 ft)
- Shape: cylindrical tower with balcony and lantern
- Markings: white tower and black lantern and dome
- Operator: Victorian Ports Corporation
- Heritage: listed on the Victorian Heritage Register
- Fog signal: diaphone: 2 blast every 30 seconds

Light
- First lit: 20 March 1902
- Focal height: 36.6 metres (120 ft)
- Range: 22 kilometres (14 mi) (white light); 19 kilometres (12 mi) (red light)
- Characteristic: Fl (2) W 15s. (horizontal beam)

Point Lonsdale Lighthouse, also known as the Point Lonsdale Signal Station, is close to the township of Point Lonsdale in the Borough of Queenscliffe, Victoria, Australia. It stands at the eastern end of the Bellarine Peninsula, on the western side of the entrance to Port Phillip from Bass Strait, on a headland overlooking The Rip, a stretch of water considered one of the more treacherous navigable passages in the world, and the only seaborne approach to Melbourne. It is operated by the Victorian Ports Corporation.

== Description ==
The current lighthouse, completed in 1902, was designed by the Victorian Public Works Department and erected by the contractors Coate Brothers. It is of a traditional design consisting of a cylindrical tower and capital, similar to many late-nineteenth-century Victorian lighthouses, such as the earlier Point Hicks Lighthouse. It is notable for its early use of reinforced concrete and is surmounted by a Chance Brothers lantern. The original oil lighthouse lamp was replaced with an acetylene light and later with an electric light. Surrounding its base is the octagonal, two-storey, brick signal station and observation room. Halfway up the tower is a cantilevered platform supporting red and green navigation lights.

== History ==
The first navigation aid at Point Lonsdale was a signal station erected in 1852. In 1856, a red pillar beacon was built. In 1863, the original Queenscliff Low Light, a prefabricated wooden structure, was re-erected at Point Lonsdale and painted with distinctive black and red bands. It used a temporary light until a permanent light was lit in 1867. The wooden lighthouse was replaced by the current concrete tower in 1902, and the wooden tower was dismantled and cut up for firewood in 1912.

In 1915, responsibility for the light passed from the state of Victoria to Commonwealth control. It was handed back in 1934, with the lighthouse classified as a “Harbour Entrance Light” rather than a "Coastal Highway Light". The signal station and observation room were added to the base of the tower in 1950. Although the light was automated in 1999, the signal station continues to be staffed, and controls the movements of commercial shipping within designated areas both outside and inside Port Phillip Heads, making it possibly the last staffed lighthouse in Australia.

== Heritage values ==
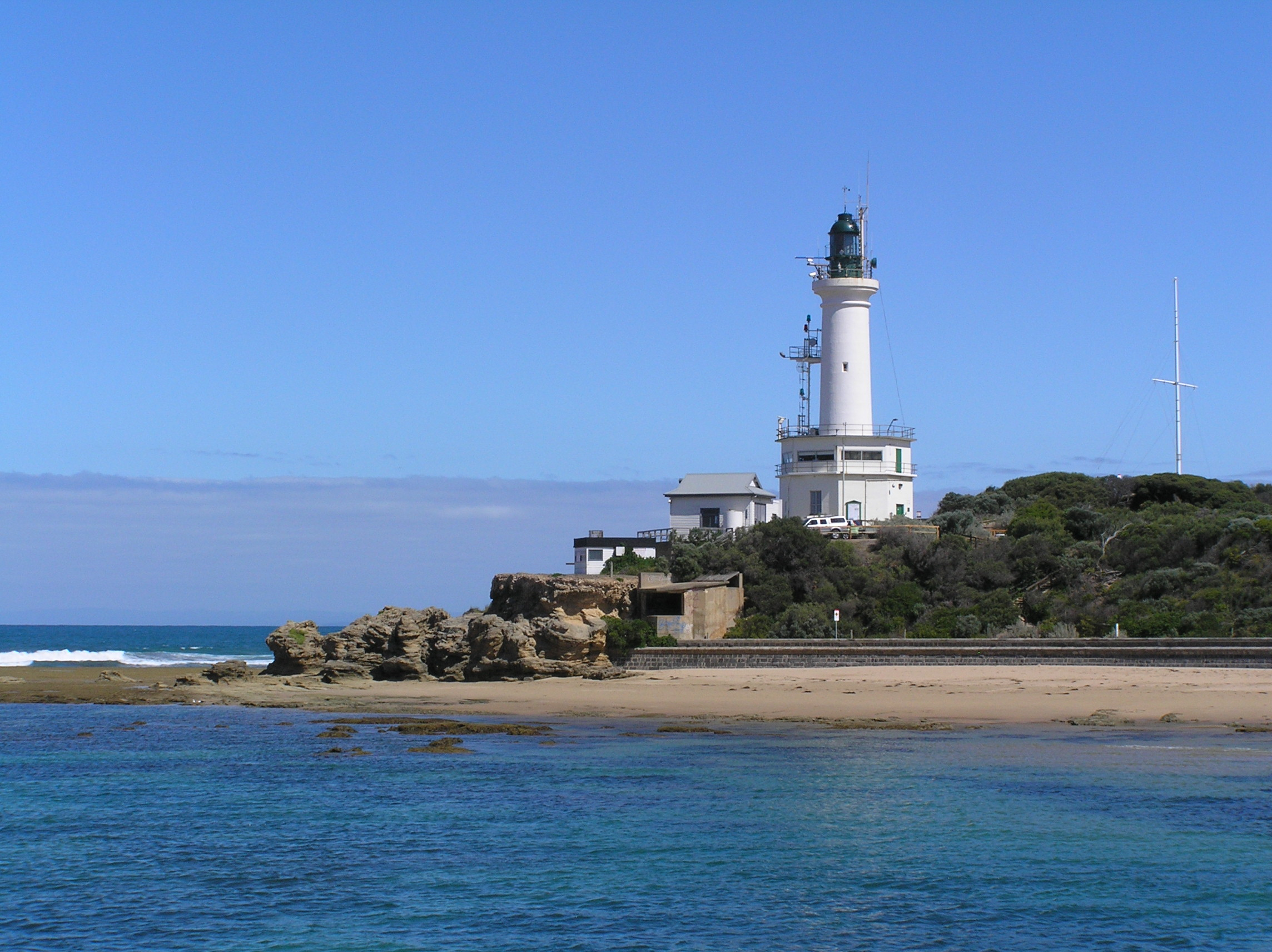
View from the north-east

The Point Lonsdale Lighthouse precinct contains not only the lighthouse itself, but other buildings associated with lighthouse operations and navigation, as well as nearby military defence structures built during the First and Second World Wars. The whole precinct is considered to be of architectural, historical and archaeological significance to the State of Victoria, and has been listed by Heritage Victoria, with the Victorian Heritage Database number H1517.

The structure is of historical significance because of its association with the maritime and defence history of the state. The lighthouse structures in the precinct show the importance of navigational aids at a time when shipping was vitally important in maintaining trade between Port Phillip and the rest of the world. The lighthouse was the first guiding light to the entrance of Port Phillip visible from the sea. The defence structures reflect the importance of the defence of Port Phillip and its major cities of Melbourne and Geelong during both World Wars.

The lighthouse precinct buildings, including a foghorn shed built in 1884 and an explosives shed (later used as a rocket shed) built in 1891, are of architectural significance. The lighthouse is a typical and aesthetically pleasing example of an early 20th-century lighthouse design. The foghorn shed is the only one known from a Victorian lighthouse, and the one Gardner Engine that remains on site sends compressed air to two vertical holding tanks which power the foghorn, all rare in their original setting. The precinct is of archaeological significance for its potential to reveal artefactual remains pertaining to the use of the site as a light station and signal station.

== The lighthouse today ==
The exterior of the lighthouse was restored in 1997 and, in 2002, Heritage Victoria and the Victorian Channels Authority cooperated to restore the interior. Celebrations marking the centenary of the structure were held on 23 March 2002. The restored foghorn is operated in foggy weather, giving a double blast every 30 seconds. There is public access to the area around the tower, and organised tours are conducted on Sundays by the Queenscliffe Maritime Museum. The marine waters around the lighthouse are protected within the Port Phillip Heads Marine National Park.

== See also ==
- List of lighthouses in Australia

== Sources ==
- Ibbotson, John (2004). Lighthouses of Australia. Images from the end of an era. Surrey Hills, VIC 3127: Australian Lighthouse Traders. ISBN 0-646-41674-X.
- "Point Lonsdale Lighthouse". Heritage Victoria.
- "Point Lonsdale Lighthouse". Lighthouses of Victoria. Archived from the original on 27 October 2009.
- Rowlett, Russ. "Lighthouses of Australia: Victoria". The Lighthouse Directory. University of North Carolina at Chapel Hill.
