= Eastern Shore Light =

Former lighthouse in Victoria, Australia

Eastern Shore Light: McCrae Light House; McCrae (Eastern) Lighthouse
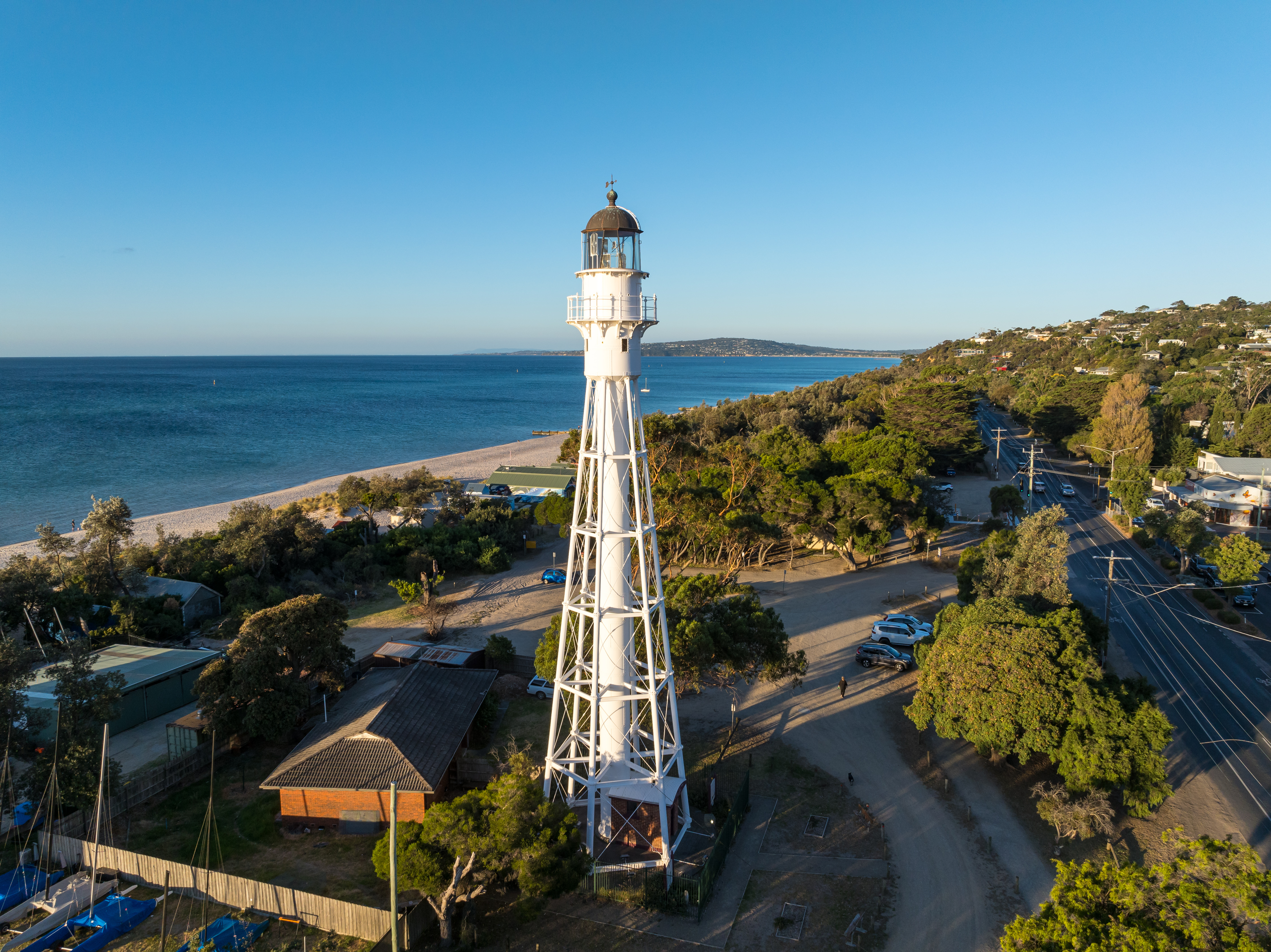
- The former light in 2025, viewed from a drone
- Location: 650 Point Nepean Road, McCrae, Mornington Peninsula, Victoria
- Coordinates: 38°20′51″S 144°55′43″E

Tower
- Constructed: 1883
- Construction: Riveted iron tower
- Automated: During World War I
- Height: 33 m (108 ft)
- Shape: Tripod lattice
- Operator: Port of Melbourne Authority
- Heritage: Victorian Heritage Register

Light
- First lit: 1883; 143 years ago
- Deactivated: 1994
- Focal height: 30.79 m (101.0 ft) AHD
- Lens: Dioptric; catadioptric; and holophotal
- Light source: 3rd order Fresnel by Chance Brothers
- Range: 13 nmi (25 km)
- Australia no.: AUS-067

History
- Built by: Public Works Department

Victorian Heritage Register
- Official name: Eastern Shore Light
- Type: Registered place
- Designated: 20 August 1982
- Reference no.: H1516
- Heritage overlay no.: HO164
- Category: Transport - Water

Register of the National Estate
- Official name: Eastern Shore Light
- Type: Defunct register
- Designated: undated
- Reference no.: 102988

The Eastern Shore Light, also called the McCrae Lighthouse and the McCrae (Eastern) Lighthouse, (Note: Other names include the Dromana Lighthouse, the Rosebud Lighthouse, the South Channel Lighthouse, and the South Channel Range Rear Light.) is a former lighthouse located in McCrae, on the eastern shore of Port Phillip Bay, on the Mornington Peninsula, in Victoria, Australia. The light operated between 1883 and 1994.

Whilst still in use, the lighthouse was added to the Victorian Heritage Register on 20 August 1982; and was also added, on unknown dates, to non-statutory lists by the Victorian branch of the National Trust and the now defunct Register of the National Estate.

== History ==
A tall timber skeleton-framed structure was the first light established at McCrae in 1854. It was later taken in sections by bullock wagon to the top of Arthurs Seat where it served for many years as a lookout until replaced by the present concrete structure apparently built for Victoria's centenary in 1934.

The South Channel Pile Light was built in 1871-2, and a new light for McCrae was ordered from Chance Brothers of Birmingham who manufactured the present lighthouse in 1874. It was transported to Australia by sea and erected onsite in 1883 and, whilst in use, was the highest light in Port Phillip Bay. The light was automated during World War I. The lighthouse keepers quarters were located at the foot of the light. These were demolished after the World War II, following automation.

The existence of the light keepers' families contributed to the number of children requiring a school closer than Dromana in the early 1870s.

== Description ==
The Eastern Shore Light is a riveted iron structure that is 33 metres (108 ft) high; with the focal height at 30.79 metres (101.0 ft) AHD, that made it Victoria's tallest lighthouse, when in use, and the light was visible at a distance of up to 13 nautical miles (25 km). The electric light was backed up by an acetylene gas standby system which automatically switched into operation in the event of a power failure or fault in the electrical equipment. The lens were dioptric, catadioptric, and holophotal. Inside the tower, there is a 120-step spiral staircase.

When in operation the light gave with the South Channel Pile Light a "lights-in-line" channel-centre guidance to inward-bound ships coming up Port Phillip Bay towards Melbourne, on a 15-second cycle with a flash duration of 12.5 seconds and an eclipse of 2.5 seconds, coloured white from 81 degrees through east to 132 degrees; and red to 150 degrees, white to 205 degrees, obscured elsewhere.

The light was decommissioned by the Port of Melbourne Authority in 1994 following modernisation of navigational aids in Port Phillip Bay. The lighthouse was transferred to the McCrae Foreshore Committee via the Department of Natural Resources and Energy in 1996.

There is a small brick building with a vaulted roof located at the base of the tower.

== See also ==
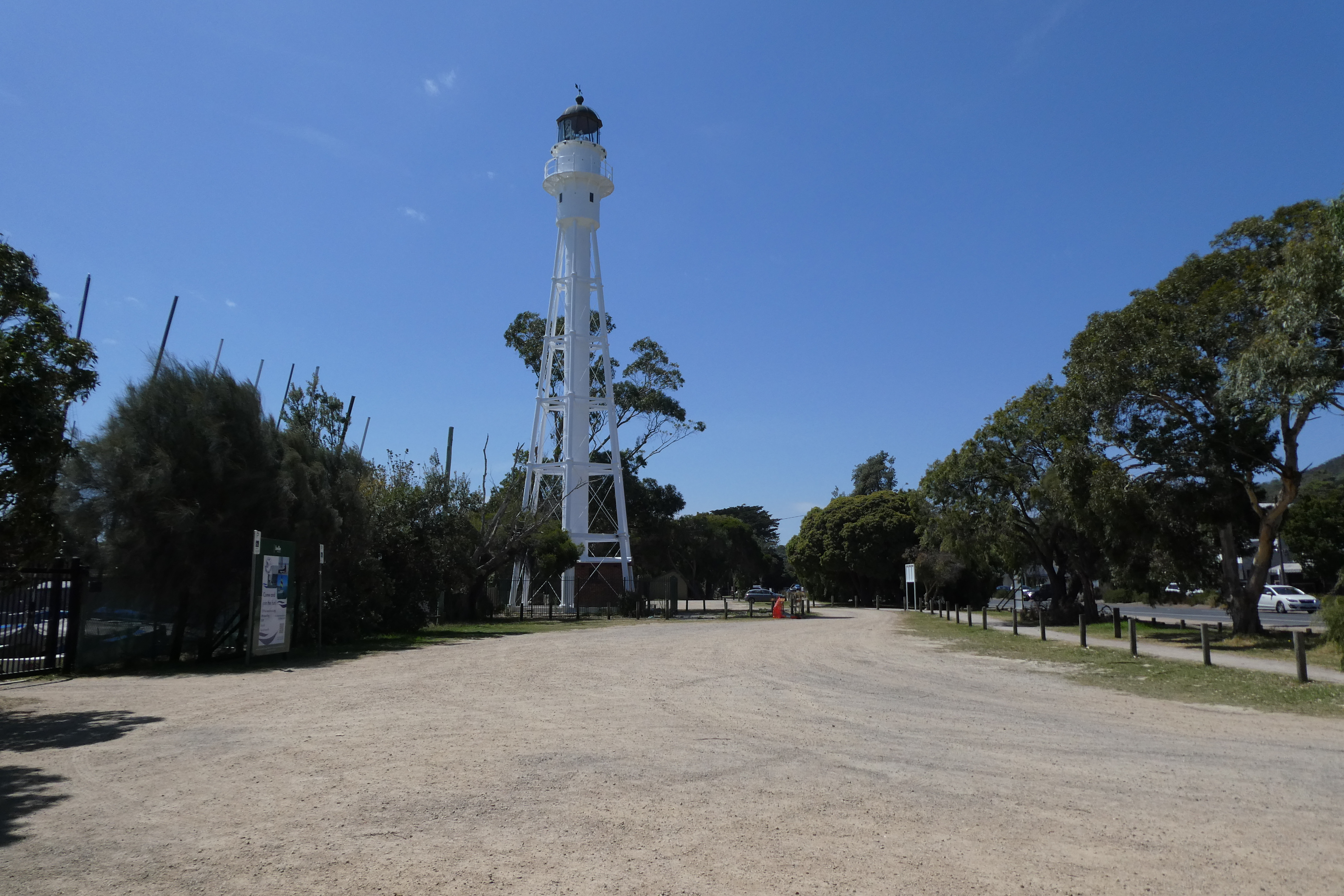
The former lighthouse viewed from the ground, in 2023

- List of lighthouses in Australia
- List of places on the Victorian Heritage Register in the Shire of Mornington Peninsula
