= The Rip =

Waterway entrance in Victoria, Australia

Coordinates: 38°17′15″S 144°38′14″E

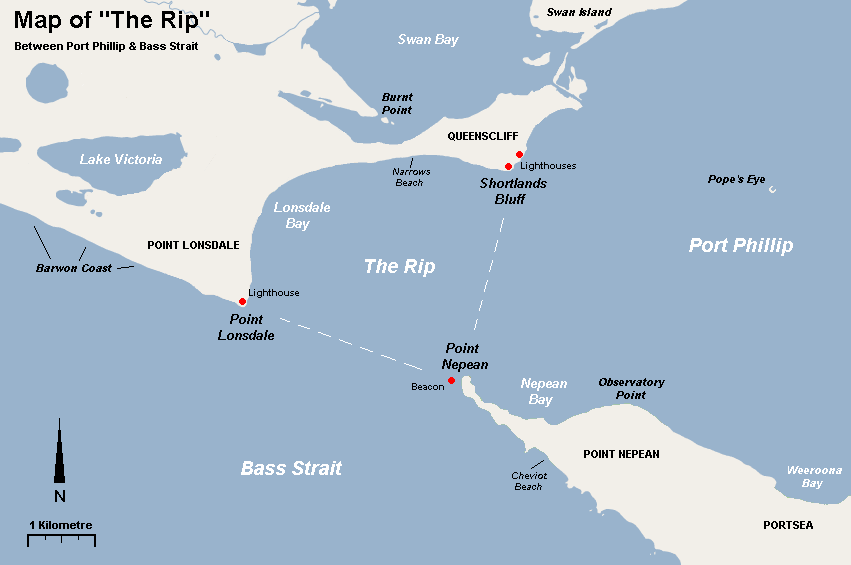
A map of the Rip and surrounding features

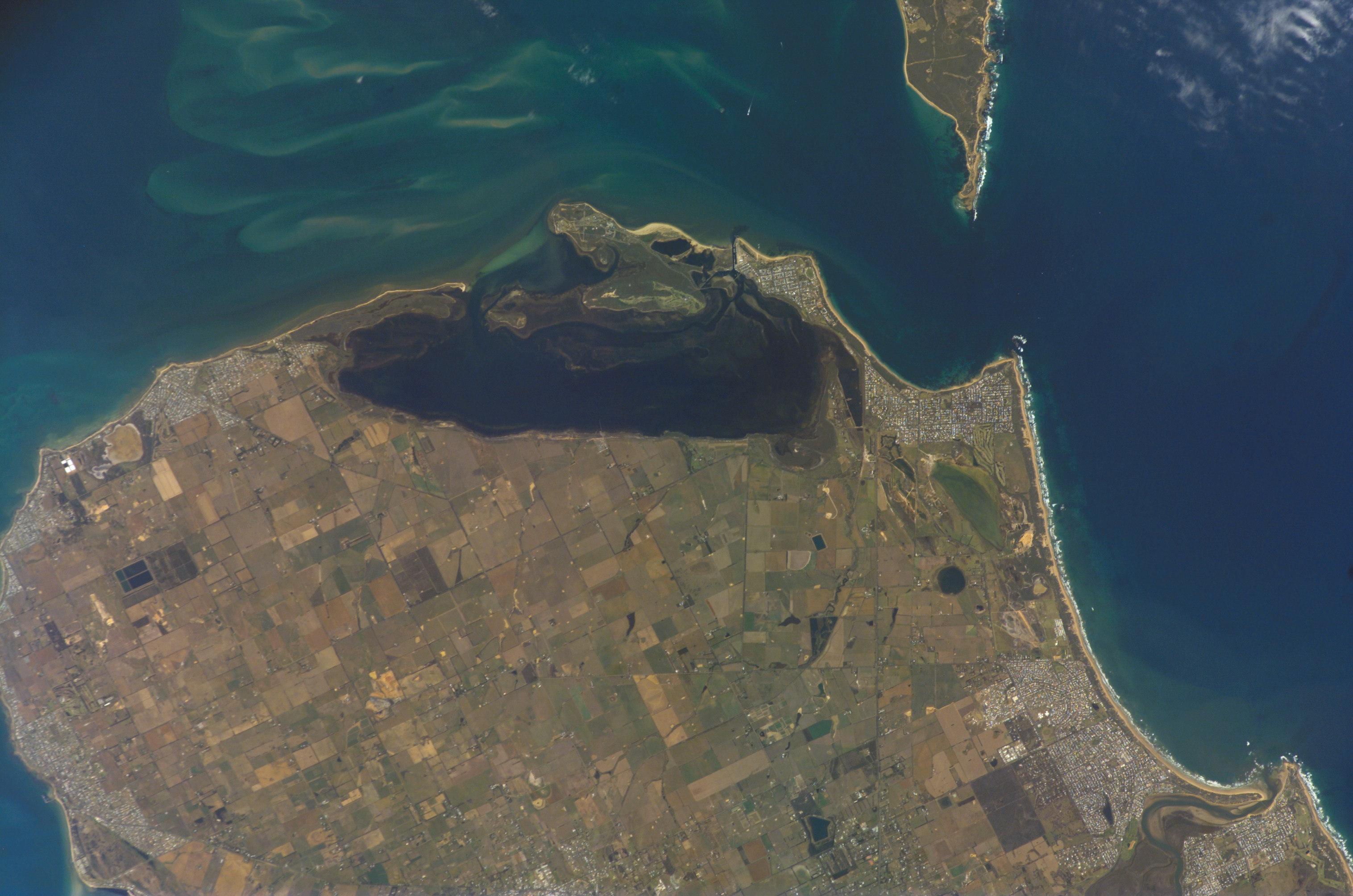
Satellite view of "The Rip" between Point Nepean and Point Lonsdale on 26 November 2007

The Rip is the narrow waterway entrance connecting the Bass Strait to the Port Phillip Bay in southern Victoria, Australia, and is the only route of maritime transport and thus seaport access into Melbourne and Geelong, Victoria's two largest cities and homes to Australia's largest and sixth-largest ports. Geographically, it is a roughly triangular area of water between Point Nepean on the Mornington Peninsula, Shortlands Bluff and Point Lonsdale on the Bellarine Peninsula, with these three headlands forming the Heads. Because of the strong oceanic tides being funnelled into the bay through this relatively narrow channel, and a high rocky seabed, the Rip is a dangerous stretch of water and has claimed numerous ships and many lives in history.

== Geography ==
The Rip is generally considered to be located in the triangular area of water between the land points of Point Nepean, Shortlands Bluff and Point Lonsdale. The entrance between Point Lonsdale and Point Nepean is 3.5 km wide but the reefs projecting from these points reduce the navigable width to about 1 km. Within 800 m outside the Heads, there is a shallow rocky flat known as the Rip Bank. The water deepens outside this flat to 30m and inside the Heads to as much as 90 m. This inequality of depth combined with tidal streams running up to 6 knots, causes the world-renowned dangerous conditions. The variation in seafloor depth within the rip itself can be anywhere from 100 m to less than 5 m amongst the rocky reefs and shoals.

== Navigation ==
The area of the Rip is a navigation hazard for recreational and small commercial vessels, due to strong tidal movements, unpredictable waves and proximity to active shipping lanes. Vessels are also prohibited from landing at Point Nepean on the southern central border of the Rip.

Control of shipping movements through the heads is managed by the Point Lonsdale Signal Station. Large ships may only enter Port Phillip with a qualified pilot aboard to help them navigate through the heads. The heads are very narrow, having a width of about 1 nautical mile (2 km). When entering, large ships must follow a precise S-shaped course through the heads. The Queenscliff Low Light ("white lighthouse") and Queenscliff High Light ("black lighthouse") form a leading line to guide ships through the main channel, in conjunction with the Hume and Murray Towers that show red and green lights respectively.

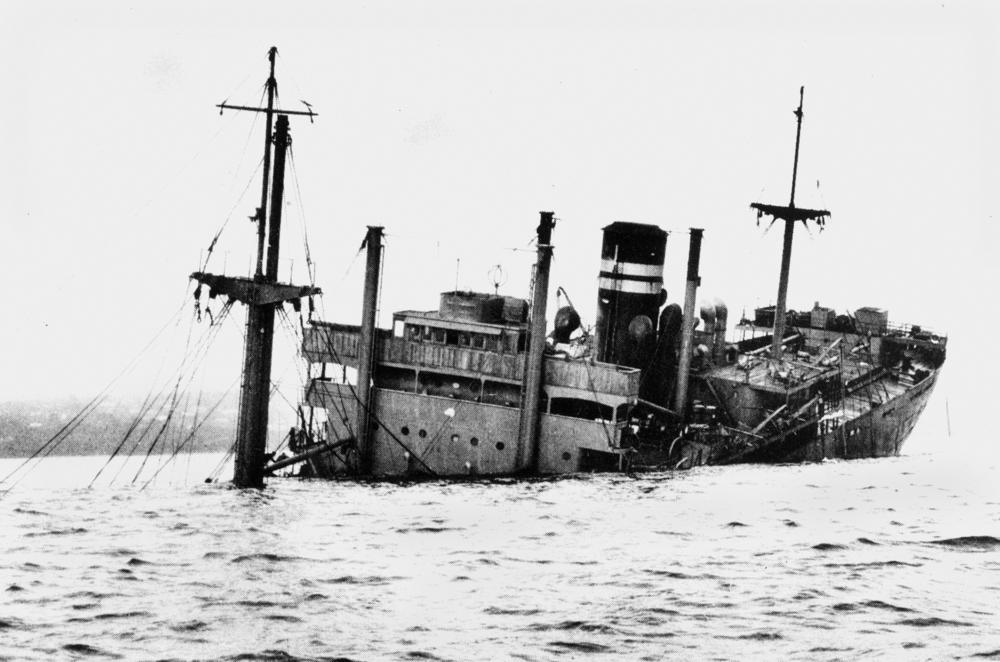
River Burnett in Port Phillip in 1955 after hitting Corsair Rock

Numerous vessels have been wrecked after getting into difficulties in the strong current in the Rip. They include the sailing ship Sacramento in 1853, cutter Corsair in 1874, steamship Formosa in 1875, barque Eliza Ramsden in 1875, steamship Cheviot in 1887, and cutter Thistle in 1945. In 1955, the cargo ship River Burnett struck Corsair Rock, freed herself, and then ran aground half-sunk in Port Phillip as a result of the damage.

== Vehicular crossings ==
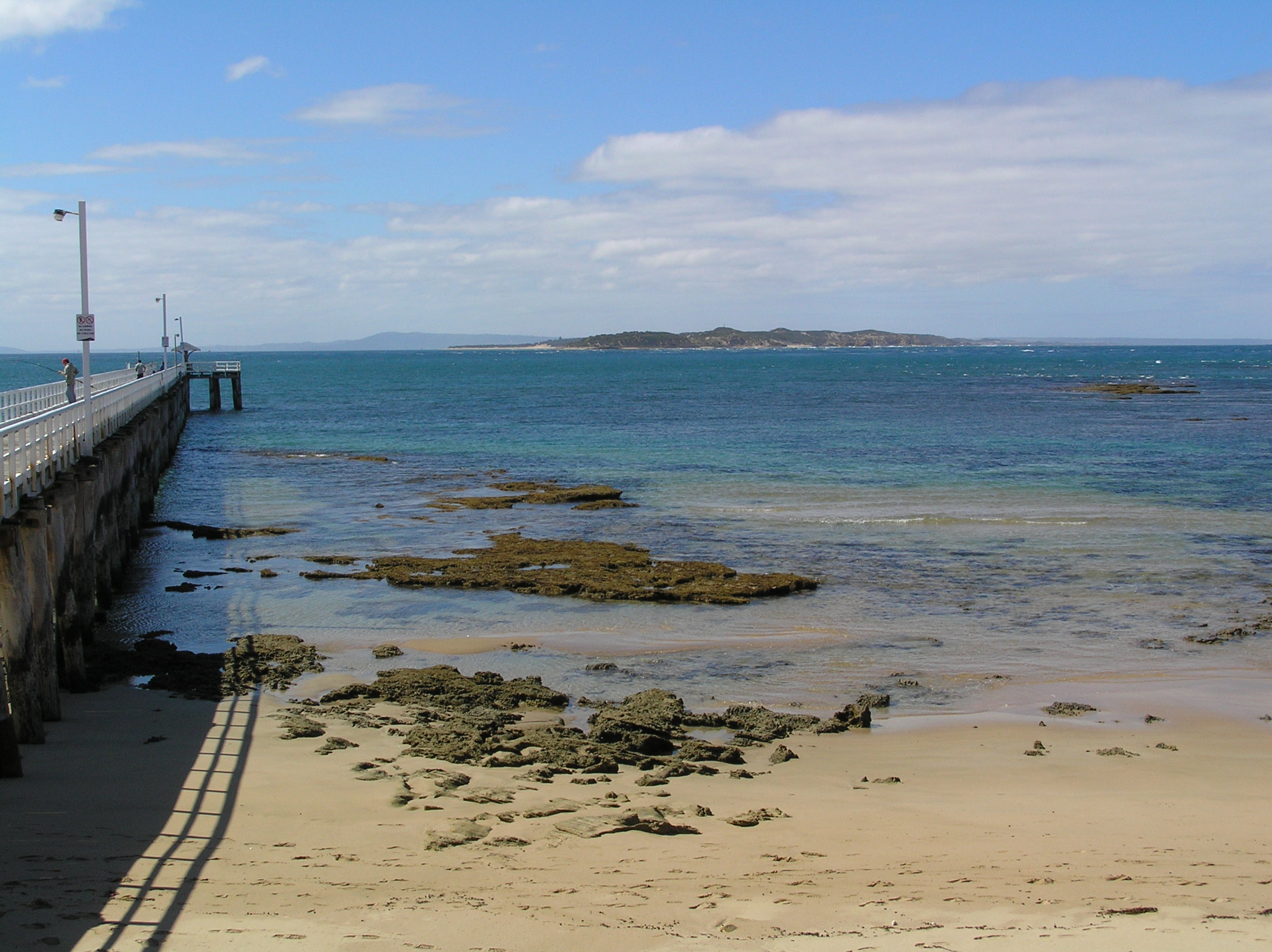
View across the Rip from Point Lonsdale towards Point Nepean

There are no bridges or tunnels that allow for vehicular traffic to cross the bay. Searoad Ferries operates a vehicular ferry service across the mouth of the bay between Queenscliff and Sorrento using two roll-on roll-off vessels.

Various bridge and tunnel projects have been proposed to link the heads of Port Phillip Bay, but none, so far, have got beyond the proposal stage. In an opinion piece published in the Herald Sun in 2018, Peter Mitchell asserted that no project would be approved in the near future because homes would have to be compulsorily acquired on both sides of the crossing, and no politician would be "prepared to bite that bullet."

In March 2023, the Mayor of Mornington Peninsula Steve Holland supported an idea for the bridge.

== Swim crossing ==
Douglas Mew was the first person to swim across the Rip, on 13 June 1971. He completed the swim without a cage, in a time of 61 minutes. This achievement is commemorated by a plaque on the Point Lonsdale side of the Rip. The date of the first double crossing of the Rip is not recorded. A group of swimmers from the Brighton Icebergers did this double crossing.

The first triple Rip crossing occurred on 11 February 2017. Grant Cameron, Fran Johnson and Esther McDonald took 5 hours and 45 minutes (moving time) to complete the crossing. Flows at the heads (tides) had a significant effect on the swim that commenced at Point Lonsdale and ended on Point Nepean.

Swimming across the Rip has often been frowned upon by authorities and considered reckless, but the body of water can now be swum safely under the guidance of the Rip Swim organisation. This project began in 2014 and after 6 years, has taken 472 swimmers across safely. The total number of swimmers officially recorded now stands at 518 as there were several groups of swimmers (predominantly from the Brighton Icebergers) who made the crossing around the late 1990s and after the year 2000.

There have been two races across the Rip, organised by the Rip Swim organisation. The first one was in 2015 and Sam Sheppard and Naantali Marshall were the winners. The next race, which took place in 2018, was the single biggest crossing of the Rip so far. On that day, 142 swimmers crossed in what was a combination of racing and group swimming. The Rip Swim organisation now focuses their efforts on taking small groups across, each accompanied by a kayaker and boats to ensure their safety.
