= List of acts of the Parliament of Victoria from 1883 =

This is a list of acts of the Parliament of Victoria, Australia for the year 1883.

== 1883 ==
The third session of the eleventh parliament of Victoria.

Short title, or popular name	Citation	Royal assent
Long title
Legislative Council Elections for 1882 Validating Act 1882 (Note: Although passed in the year 1882, and given a short title ending '...Act 1882', the need to obtain approval for this act from the United Kingdom meant it was not proclaimed until the year 1883.) (repealed)	46 Vict. No. 745	30 January 1883 (Note: This act was reserved for approval by Her Majesty.)
An Act to remove doubts as to the validity of "The Legislative Council Elections for 1882 Act." (Note: Legislative Council Elections for 1882 Act 1881 (45 Vict. No. 720)) (Repealed by Constitution Act Amendment Act 1890 (54 Vict. No. 1075))

The first session of the twelfth parliament of Victoria.

Short title, or popular name	Citation	Royal assent
Long title
	46 Vict. No. 746	8 March 1883
An Act to apply out of the Consolidated Revenue the sum of Five hundred and eighty-seven thousand five hundred pounds to the service of the year One thousand eight hundred and eighty-two and three.
Public Works Temporary Advances Act 1883	46 Vict. No. 747	8 March 1883
An Act to apply temporarily out of the Consolidated Revenue or out of "The Railway Loan Account 1878" certain sums of money towards the completion of certain public works.
Melbourne Harbor Trust Act Amendment Act 1883 (repealed)	46 Vict. No. 749	19 April 1883
An Act to amend "The Melbourne Harbor Trust Act 1876." (Note: Melbourne Harbor Trust Act 1876 (40 Vict. No. 552)) (Repealed by Melbourne Harbor Trust Act 1890 (54 Vict. No. 1119))
Fisheries Act Continuance Act 1883	46 Vict. No. 750	19 April 1883
An Act to re-enact and continue "The Fisheries Act Amendment Act 1878." (Note: Fisheries Act Amendment Act 1878 (42 Vict. No. 622))
Expiring Laws Continuance Act 1883	46 Vict. No. 751	19 April 1883
An Act to continue various Expiring Laws.
Railways Additional Works Act 1883	46 Vict. No. 752	19 April 1883
An Act to authorize the Construction of additional works on the Victorian State Railways and for other purposes.
Water Supply Loans Act 1883	46 Vict. No. 753	19 April 1883
An Act to sanction the issue and application of certain sums of money as Loans for Water Supply in the Country Districts.
	46 Vict. No. 754	19 April 1883
An Act to provide for reimbursing Members of the Legislative Assembly their expenses in relation to their attendance in Parliament.
	46 Vict. No. 755	19 April 1883
An Act to apply a sum out of the Consolidated Revenue to the service of the year ending the last day of June One thousand eight hundred and eighty-three and to appropriate the Supplies granted in this and the last preceding Session of Parliament.

The second session of the twelfth parliament of Victoria.

Short title, or popular name	Citation	Royal assent
Long title
	47 Vict. No. 756	27 July 1883
An Act to apply out of the Consolidated Revenue the sum of Nine hundred and fifty-eight thousand two hundred and sixty pounds to the service of the year One thousand eight hundred, and eighty-three and four.
Railway Loan Account Application Act 1883	47 Vict. No. 757	31 August 1883
An Act to apply temporarily out of the Consolidated Revenue or out of "The Railway Loan Account 1881" certain sums of money for Permanent-way Material, Rolling-stock, and other Works.
	47 Vict. No. 758	27 September 1883
An Act to apply out of the Consolidated Revenue the sum of Nine hundred and fifty-five thousand pounds to the service of the year One thousand eight hundred and eighty-three and four.
Swanston-street (Temporary) Bridge Act 1883	47 Vict. No. 759	27 September 1883
An Act to provide for the erection of a Temporary Bridge across the Yarra in a line with Swanston-street and for other works.
Victorian Railway Loan and Debentures Redemption Act 1883 or the Railway Loan Act 1883	47 Vict. No. 760	12 October 1883
An Act to authorize the Raising of Money for the Construction of Railways the Redemption or Payment of certain Debentures and for other purposes.
Judicature Act 1883	47 Vict. No. 761	12 October 1883
An Act to improve the Jurisdiction and Procedure of the Supreme Court and for other purposes connected therewith.
	47 Vict. No. 762	12 October 1883
An Act to remove doubts as to the power of the Governor in Council to change the names of Shires Boroughs Towns or Cities and of the Corporations thereof. (Repealed by Local Government Act 1890 (54 Vict. No. 1112))
Melbourne Harbor Trust Further Amendment Act 1883 (repealed)	47 Vict. No. 763	12 October 1883
An Act to further amend "The Melbourne Harbor Trust Act 1876." (Note: Melbourne Harbor Trust Act 1876 (40 Vict. No. 552)) (Repealed by Melbourne Harbor Trust Act 1890 (54 Vict. No. 1119))
	47 Vict. No. 764	12 October 1883
An Act to provide for the Incorporation of Literary Scientific and other Associations and Institutions. (Repealed by Companies Act 1890 (54 Vict. No. 1074))
Melbourne Tramway and Omnibus Company's Act 1883	47 Vict. No. 765	12 October 1883
An Act to authorize the Melbourne Tramway and Omnibus Company Limited to construct Tramways in the Cities of Melbourne Fitzroy Collingwood Prahran Richmond and South Melbourne and the Town of Hotham and the Boroughs of St. Kilda Brunswick Kew Hawthorn and Sandridge and for other purposes.
Mallee Pastoral Leases Act 1883 (repealed)	47 Vict. No. 766	12 October 1883
An Act to regulate the Pastoral Occupation of the Mallee Country in the North-Western District of Victoria. (Repealed by Land Act 1890 (54 Vict. No. 1106))
Victorian Railways Commissioners Act 1883 (repealed)	47 Vict. No. 767	1 November 1883
An Act to make better provision for the Construction Maintenance and Management of State Railways. (Repealed by Railways Act 1890 (54 Vict. No. 1135))
Customs Act 1883 (repealed)	47 Vict. No. 768	1 November 1883
An Act to consolidate the Laws relating to the Customs. (Repealed by Customs Act 1890 (54 Vict. No. 1081))
Duties of Customs Act 1883 (repealed)	47 Vict. No. 769	1 November 1883
An Act for Consolidating the Duties of Customs. (Repealed by Customs and Excise Duties Act 1890 (54 Vict. No. 1082))
	47 Vict. No. 770	1 November 1883
An Act to amend the Law relating to the Suppression of Betting and Gaming Houses. (Repealed by Police Offences Act 1890 (54 Vict. No. 1126))
	47 Vict. No. 771	1 November 1883
An Act to enable the Board of Land and Works and the Mayor Councillors and Burgesses of the Borough of Dunolly to convert into Public Gardens a piece of land granted as a site for a Public Market at Dunolly.
Bills of Exchange Act 1883	47 Vict. No. 772	1 November 1883
An Act to codify the law relating to Bills of Exchange Cheques and Promissory Notes.
Public Service Act 1883 (repealed)	47 Vict. No. 773	1 November 1833
An Act to make better provision for the Public Service of Victoria. (Repealed by Public Service Act 1890 (54 Vict. No. 1133))
Expiring Laws Further Continuance Act 1883	47 Vict. No. 774	1 November 1883
An Act to continue various Expiring Laws.
	47 Vict. No. 775	3 November 1883
An Act to apply a sum out of the Consolidated Revenue to the service of the year ending the last day of June One thousand eight hundred and eighty-four and to appropriate the Supplies granted in this Session of Parliament.
	47 Vict. No. 776	3 November 1883
An Act to apply out of "The Railway Loan Account 1881," "The Railway Loan Liquidation and Construction Account," Act No. 580 (Note: Railway Construction Act 1877 (41 Vict. No. 580)) and Act No. 657, (Note: 44 Vict. No. 657) certain sums of money to complete the Construction of Railways authorized under Act No. 682 (Note: Railway Construction Act 1880 (44 Vict. No. 682)) and for other works and purposes.
Discipline Act 1883 (repealed)	47 Vict. No. 777	3 November 1883
An Act to further amend "The Discipline Act 1870." (Note: Discipline Act 1870 (34 Vict. No. 389)) (Repealed by Defences and Discipline Act 1890 (54 Vict. No. 1083))
Victorian Water Conservation Act 1883	47 Vict. No. 778	3 November 1883
An Act to amend "The Victorian Water Conservation Act 1881." (Note: Victorian Water Conservation Act 1881 (45 Vict. No. 716))
Forfeiture of Mining Shares Act 1883 (repealed)	47 Vict. No. 779	3 November 1883
An Act for limiting the time within which proceedings shall be taken for the recovery of Shares declared to have been forfeited. (Repealed by Companies Act 1890 (54 Vict. No. 1074))
Officials in Parliament Act 1883 (repealed)	47 Vict. No. 780	3 November 1883
An Act to further amend the Act intituled "An Act to limit the number of persons holding offices under the Crown who may sit and vote in the Legislative Council and Assembly of Victoria." (Note: 23 Vict. No. 91) (Repealed by Constitution Act Amendment Act 1890 (54 Vict. No. 1075))
Post Office Act 1883	47 Vict. No. 781	3 November 1883
An Act to consolidate and amend the Law relating to the Post Office and for other purposes.
Public Health Amendment Statute 1883 (repealed)	47 Vict. No. 782	3 November 1883
An Act to amend the Laws relating to Public Health. (Repealed by Health Act 1890 (54 Vict. No. 1098))
Regulation of Mines and Mining Machinery Act 1883 (repealed)	47 Vict. No. 783	3 November 1883
An Act to provide for the Regulation and Inspection of Mines and Machinery. (Repealed by Mines Act 1890 (54 Vict. No. 1120))
Melbourne Tramway and Omnibus Company's Branches Act 1883	47 Vict. No. 784	3 November 1883
An Act to authorize the Melbourne Tramway and Omnibus Company Limited to construct Tramway Branches in the Cities of Fitzroy Collingwood Richmond and South Melbourne and the Boroughs of St. Kilda Kew and Hawthorn and for other purposes.
	47 Vict. No. 785	3 November 1883
An Act to enable the Mayor Councillors and Burgesses of the Borough of Brighton to sell and convey certain lands and to apply the proceeds of such sale to the erection of a Court House and other buildings. (Repealed by Statute Law Revision Act 1984 (No. 10087))
Local Government Act Amendment Act 1883	47 Vict. No. 786	3 November 1883
An Act to further amend the "Local Government Act 1874." (Note: Local Government Act 1874 (38 Vict. No. 506))

== Sources ==
- "1883 Victorian Historical Acts". AustLII.
