= Victorian Regional Channels Authority =

Former government authority in Victoria, Australia

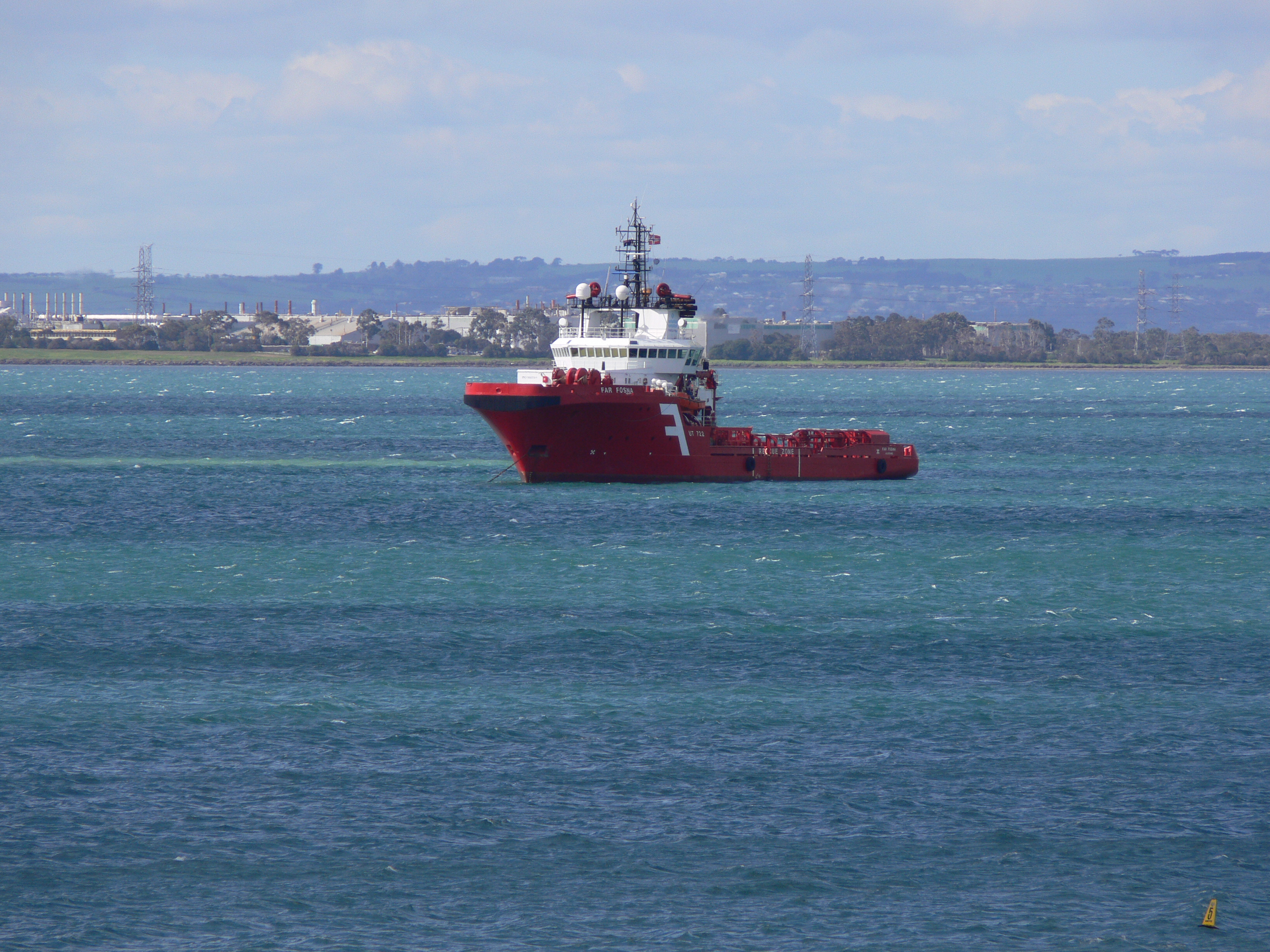
- This support vessel at the Port of Geelong operates in waters managed by the VRCA.

Authority overview
- Formed: 1 April 2004; 22 years ago
- Preceding authority: Victorian Channels Authority
- Dissolved: 30 June 2021
- Superseding authority: Ports Victoria
- Type: Statutory authority
- Jurisdiction: Port of Geelong; Port of Hastings; Port of Portland; Other regional waters
- Headquarters: Channels House 235 Ryrie St Geelong VIC 3220
- Employees: 9 (June 2018)
- Minister responsible: Melissa Horne, Minister for Ports and Freight
- Authority executive: Michael Harvey, Chief Executive Officer
- Parent department: Department of Transport
- Key documents: Transport Integration Act 2010; Port Management Act 1995
- Website: vrca.vic.gov.au

The Victorian Regional Channels Authority (VRCA) was the channel management authority of the Victorian Government for the Port of Geelong, the Port of Portland, the Port of Hastings, and 13 other regional ports. In 2021, it was merged with the Victorian Ports Corporation into a new agency, Ports Victoria.

== History ==
From 1996 to 2004, all shipping channels in Victorian waters were managed by the Victorian Channels Authority (VCA). The responsibilities of the VCA included navigation systems and dredging to maintain the depth of the major channels.

In 2003, the state government passed legislation creating a new Port of Melbourne Corporation (PoMC) to oversee the operations of the Port of Melbourne. The PoMC absorbed the functions of the former Melbourne Ports Corporation as the commercial port operator, and took over responsibility of the Port of Melbourne's shipping channels from the VCA. The VCA was formally abolished on 31 March 2004, and on 1 April, the PoMC became channel management authority for Melbourne, while the VRCA was set up to manage the channels of the ports of Geelong, Portland and Hastings. Its inaugural CEO was Ian Scott, the last CEO of the VCA, and its chairman was Michael Dowling.

The VRCA took responsibility for planning, operation and management of the channels serving the Port of Geelong. The private port management companies of Hastings and Portland retained day-to-day responsibility for the operation of their approach channels, although the VRCA established a regime of inspections by the Geelong harbourmaster to ensure safety and prudent management.

Although the VRCA's primary function remained the safe navigation of shipping in the regional ports, it also adopted responsibility for the promotion of regional ports to shipping companies. The appointment of a commercial manager in late 2004 saw the VRCA begin to examine its potential for commercial advantages over the Port of Melbourne, then rapidly approaching its capacity despite the Port Phillip Channel Deepening Project being undertaken.

By 2006, despite a permanent staff of only six, including two harbourmasters, the operations of the VRCA were highly successful, obtaining an extra 10 centimetres (3.9 in) of draught at the Port of Geelong through modernised operations. The increased draught significantly improved the economic viability of the channels, and Shipping Australia, an industry peak body, said that it "couldn't praise them enough" for their management of the Geelong channels. The improved draught contributed to a year of record grain export at the port.

The VRCA commenced further dredging operations in 2016 throughout Port Phillip Bay.

Michael Harvey was appointed as the CEO of the VRCA in February 2017 by the state government. In July 2017, the authority engaged public relations firm Brand Bureau to plan and implement a new awareness campaign.

In March 2021, the state government announced that VRCA would be merged with the Victorian Ports Corporation into a new agency, Ports Victoria, to provide channel management and regulatory services across all Victoria's commercial ports.
