= William Thomas Appleton =

Australian shipping entrepreneur

- Born: 2 May 1859; Leeds, Yorkshire, England
- Died: 16 February 1930 (aged 70); Malvern, Australia
- Spouse: Elizabeth Jane Traill (27 April 1882)
- Children: 2 daughters 5 sons (eldest killed at Pozières in 1916)

William Thomas Appleton (1859–1930), was an Australian businessman, shipping agent and public servant. He was born on 2 May 1859 in Leeds, Yorkshire, England. His father, Thomas Appleton was a bookbinder, and his mother was Mary (née Burnley).

In late 1859 the Appleton family visited a maternal uncle (William Burnley) who ran an import-export agency in the Port Phillip District, after which William Appleton returned to England and completed his education at Wharfdale College, Yorkshire. He then returned with his parents to Victoria in 1869 settling in Geelong, where he attended the Melbourne Church of England Grammar School in 1872–73.

He worked with his brother (Colonel) George Burnley Appleton (1850–1945) at his Geelong woolbroking firm. Later he was chairman of Huddart Parker & Co. Pty Ltd. Appleton joined this firm in Geelong c. 1884 becoming Manager in 1887, then moving to the Melbourne office. He joined the board of management in 1894 becoming managing director in 1898 and chairman of the company in 1910–30.

Whilst on the Harbour Trust, Appleton supported long-term plans for new dock construction. Appleton Dock on the north side of the Yarra River was named after him. During World War I Appleton held a number of temporary official posts. He died of cancer at his home in Malvern on 16 February 1930 leaving an estate of £131,323.

== Industry achievements ==
- Founding Chairman of the Australasian Steamship Owners' Federation 1899–1903, chairman 1908, 1911–16, 1920–21, 1925–30
- Ship-owner Representative of the Melbourne Harbour Trust November 1906, chairman April 1911–1913, senior commissioner 1913–1930
- Council-member of the Melbourne Chamber of Commerce, President 1914–16
- President of the Associated Chambers of Commerce of Australia 1915–16, President of the Geelong branch
- Chairman of several shipping and colliery companies
- Director of AWA
- Trustee of the Geelong Savings Bank
- Founding Director of the Western and Wimmera Districts of Victoria Freezing Co
- Inaugural National Laboratory Conference 1916
- Negotiated for the formation of the CSIRO
