= Victorian Ports Corporation =

Former government authority in Melbourne, Victoria

Authority overview
- Formed: 1 November 2016
- Preceding authority: Port of Melbourne Corporation
- Dissolved: 30 June 2021
- Superseding authority: Ports Victoria
- Type: Statutory authority
- Headquarters: 530 Collins Street
- Employees: 59 (June 2018)
- Minister responsible: Melissa Horne, Minister for Ports and Freight
- Authority executive: Rachel Johnson, CEO
- Parent department: Department of Transport & Planning
- Key document: Transport Integration Act 2010
- Website: vicports.vic.gov.au
- Agency ID: PROV VA 5216

The Victorian Ports Corporation (VPC) was a statutory authority of the Government of Victoria created to succeed the Port of Melbourne Corporation as the government regulator of shipping in Port Phillip Bay after the lease of the Port of Melbourne in 2016. In 2021, it was merged with the Victorian Regional Channels Authority into a new agency, Ports Victoria.

== History ==
In mid-2015, the government of Premier Daniel Andrews announced that the Port of Melbourne would be leased to a private operator, in order to fund a program of level crossing removals, with the government remaining the landowner.

In August 2016, with negotiations on the lease underway, the Victorian Ports Corporation was introduced as the agency which would perform the government's remaining functions in the operation of the port, including management of the shipping channels in Port Phillip Bay, waterside emergency services, and the operation of the Station Pier facility for cruise shipping. The government appointed Rachel Johnson, formerly of Transport for NSW as the VPC's inaugural Chief Executive Officer and announced that she would report to the Port of Melbourne Corporation until it was privatised. On 19 September, the government finalised the 50-year lease of the port to a corporation comprising the Queensland Investment Corporation, the Future Fund, OMERS and Global Infrastructure Partners for $9.7 billion.

Minister for Ports Luke Donnellan announced the appointment of a board of directors on 3 November 2016.

With the establishment of Transport for Victoria in mid-2017, VPC became one of its subsidiary agencies. In May 2017, after the release of a report by the Australian Transport Safety Bureau into the breakaway of the Spirit of Tasmania II from its moorings at Station Pier, the VPC announced a new weather warnings service on its traffic management radio channel.

The role of VPC was examined by a review of the Victorian port system in 2020. In March 2021, the state government announced that VPC would be merged with the Victorian Regional Channels Authority into a new agency, Ports Victoria, to provide channel management and regulatory services across all Victoria's commercial ports.

== Operations ==
The VPC was required to promote and market the Port of Melbourne, in addition to its function as the regulator and provider of navigation services within the port. This role included the employment of a Harbourmaster to oversee port operations, and the engagement of other maritime contractors.

Preceded by Port of Melbourne Corporation	Port of Melbourne regulation 2016–	Succeeded by Incumbent
