= Port of Melbourne Authority =

Former port authority of Melbourne, Australia

The Port of Melbourne Authority (PMA) was formed under the Port of Melbourne Authority Act 1978 (No. 9178 (Vic)) to take over the functions of the Melbourne Harbor Trust.

== History ==
Following the passage of the incorporating act, the PMA was formed in 1978. It moved from its Market Street head office to the World Trade Centre (Melbourne) in 1983, a building which had been constructed by the PMA on port land. Subsequent restructuring in 1997 saw the Melbourne Port Corporation take over the PMA property and assets, while the Victorian Channels Authority gained berthing responsibilities, and the Melbourne Port Services was privatised and put out to tender. The Port of Melbourne Corporation was formed on 1 July 2003, taking over the Melbourne Port Corporation, and the Victorian Channels Authority.

== Journal ==
The PMA published the Port of Melbourne Quarterly, (ISSN 0048-4865) later Title Port Panorama (ISSN 0814-9089) which combined with the Port Gazette (ISSN 0815-6085).
