= Victorian Producers' Co-operative Company Limited =

The Victorian Producers’ Co‐operative Company Limited (VPC) was an agricultural cooperative which operated as a financer and sales agency in Victoria, Australia, for the co-operate benefit of farmer members. It was established in 1910 and continued in operation until taken over by the firm Elders in 1999.

The founders believed they had to escape what they termed ...the tyrannical conditions imposed on them by middlemen in the sale of their produce and the purchase of their requirements.

The VPC undertook the roles of selling wool, livestock and real estate (generally farms) on a commission, and providing finance to farmers on short term or seasonal loans and insurance services, as well as setting up stores for the sale of farm supplies, including veterinary products, agricultural chemicals and fencing supplies. The VPC was also a major wheat buyer and seller, until the 1940s when the Australian Wheat Board took over statutory control of marketing the Australian wheat crop.

At its peak in the late 1980s, the VPC had more than 5000 members, with a turn-over of more than $500 million annually, over 300 permanent employees as well as hundreds more part-time and casual workers. It erected large wool stores in Melbourne, Geelong and Portland and had over 50 branches throughout country Victoria, as well as the Riverina District of NSW and the South East region of South Australia.

John Percival Webb, one of the longstanding Melbourne Harbour Trust Commissioners was managing director of the VPC for many years.

The 1990s the VPC took over McNamara Ellis, a Deniliquin Stock & Station Agency, but the collapse of the Australian Wool Reserve Price Scheme, saw their income slashed and they were themselves taken over by rival firm Elders in 1999.
