= Queenscliff Low Light =

Lighthouse in Victoria, Australia

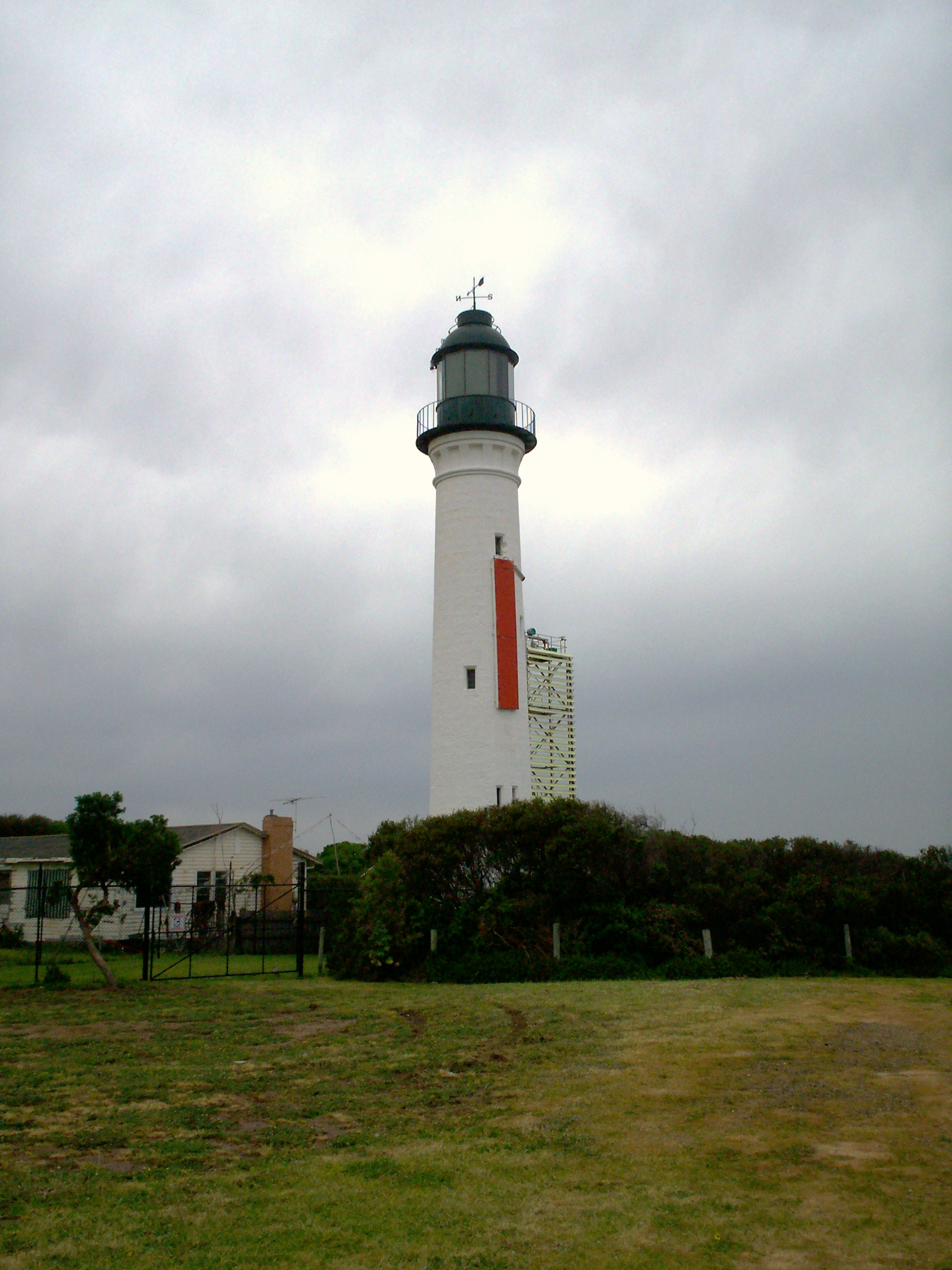
- Queenscliff Low Light
- Location: Port Phillip; Victoria; Australia
- Coordinates: 38°16′25.5″S 144°39′33.4″E

Tower
- Constructed: 1854 (first)
- Construction: bluestone tower
- Automated: 1999
- Height: 22.2 metres (73 ft)
- Shape: cylindrical tower with balcony and lantern
- Markings: white tower with vertical red daymark, green lantern and balcony
- Power source: mains electricity
- Operator: Port of Melbourne Corporation

Light
- First lit: 1863 (current)
- Focal height: 28.6 metres (94 ft)
- Range: white: 22 kilometres (14 mi) red: 20 kilometres (12 mi) green: 11 kilometres (6.8 mi)
- Characteristic: Oc. W 15s.

The Queenscliff Low Light, also known as the Queenscliff White Lighthouse, is a lighthouse in the township of Queenscliff in the Borough of Queenscliffe, Victoria, Australia, at the eastern end of the Bellarine Peninsula. It stands inside the entrance to Port Phillip from Bass Strait, on the lower slope of the Queenscliff Peninsula overlooking "The Rip", a stretch of water considered one of the ten most treacherous navigable passages in the world. It is operated by the Port of Melbourne Corporation.

== History ==
The light station was first established in 1854 with a prefabricated wooden lighthouse, which was dismantled in 1863 and moved to Point Lonsdale when the permanent lighthouse was built. The lamp and its housings were manufactured in England by Chance Brothers. The light was converted to gas in 1890 and to electricity in 1924.

== Operation ==
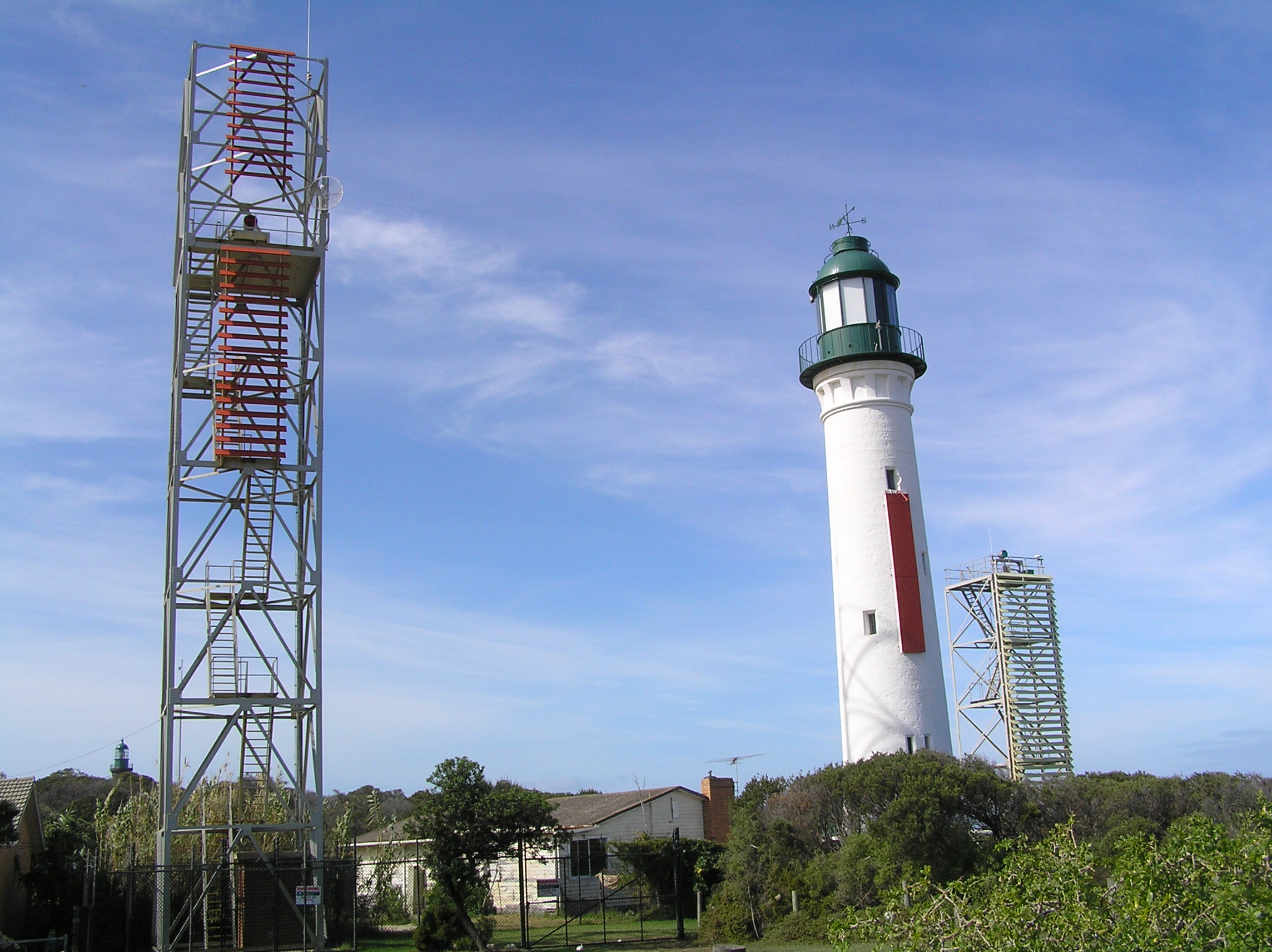
Queenscliff Low Light between the Hume and Murray Towers

The main purpose of the lighthouse is to show a white light in range with the Queenscliff High Light as a guide for ships in the main channel entering Port Phillip. It is flanked by the skeletal Hume and Murray Towers, showing red and green lights respectively, that blink in unison with the lighthouse to provide a unique entrance pattern defining the correct course through the Rip.

== See also ==
- List of lighthouses in Australia

== Sources ==
- Ibbotson, John (2004). Lighthouses of Australia. Images from the end of an era. Surrey Hills, VIC 3127: Australian Lighthouse Traders. ISBN 0-646-41674-X.
- Rowlett, Russ. "Lighthouses of Australia: Victoria". The Lighthouse Directory. University of North Carolina at Chapel Hill.
