= John Percival Webb =

Australian commissioner

John Percival Webb OBE was the longest serving commissioner on the Melbourne Harbor Trust in Melbourne, Australia.

Webb was first appointed to the Harbor Trust Board in 1941. He was its chairman from 27 May 1941 to 31 August 1971, and Webb Dock was subsequently named in his honour in 1968. He was also chairman and managing director of the Victorian Producers' Co‐operative Company Limited, and was appointed as an officer of the Order of the British Empire 'for public services in the State of Victoria' in 1962.
