= Port of Hastings Corporation =

Government authority of Victoria, Australia

The Port of Hastings Corporation is an authority of the Government of Victoria, Australia. The authority is responsible for the development and management of the Port of Hastings located in Western Port Bay approximately 72 kilometres to the south east of Melbourne.

== About the Port of Hastings Corporation ==
The Port of Hastings Corporation (PoHC) is a public entity established in January 2012 under the Transport Integration Act 2010 (Vic).

As the Port Operator for Western Port Bay, they are responsible for managing the operations at the Port of Hastings, including maintaining the associated port infrastructure (except for the BlueScope owned steel wharves).

== Port operations ==
=== Current trade ===
The Port of Hastings Corporation reports an average of 125 vessel per year, with total trade volumes of 1.73 million tones.

The Port of Hastings' current trade groups include import/export of oil, liquid petroleum gas (LPG), steel, aviation fuel and unleaded petrol (ULP).

In the 1970s the potential of Western Port was identified for the establishment of large-scale process industries, which require both deep water and extensive land adjacent to a port. Areas were identified to be set aside for port purposes so that the State's options about any future port development at Western Port could be preserved.

The Port of Hastings has continued to safely operate, catering for both bulk liquid and gas trades, and in recent years, the Port of Hastings has been selected by the Victorian Government as the preferred location for the Victorian Renewable Energy Terminal, which presents an opportunity for a new chapter for the Port.

=== Stony Point Jetty and Depot ===
The facilities at Stony Point are used by Harbour service craft, Harbour tugs, passenger ferries, the Royal Australia Navy (for training vessels), the fishing industry, as well as for oil exploration vessels and small commercial vessels

=== Crib Point Jetty ===
The Crib Point Jetty is a state owned asset used by United Australia for the discharge of refined hydrocarbons such as motor spirits, automative diesel and Jet Fuel to their terminal located in Hastings.

=== Long Island Point Jetty ===
The Long Island Point Jetty is a state-owned facility that is utilised by Esso Australia for export of Crude Oil and liquid gas.

== Proposed Victorian Renewable Energy Terminal ==
On September 10 2023, the Victorian State Government announced that the Port of Hastings is the preferred location for the establishment of a dedicated assembly port to support the construction of Victoria's first offshore wind farms along the Victorian coast.

The Victorian Government has identified the Victorian Renewable Energy Terminal as critical to supporting the state's target of achieving net zero emissions by 2045.

The media release noted: "There is currently no port in Australia that can facilitate large scale offshore wind construction, and this major development from the Labor Government will deliver critical, nation-leading enabling infrastructure."

The Victorian Renewable Energy Terminal is proposed at the Old Tyabb Reclamation Area (OTRA) and the adjacent marine area. The OTRA is a 25-hectare land area located in the existing port precinct between the Esso's Long Island Point jetty and the BlueScope Steel wharves.

Once operational, the site would be equipped for the receival, assembly and installation of offshore wind foundations, towers and turbines as a multi-user facility, with berthing facilities, heavy duty pavements and major supporting infrastructure.

=== State approvals ===
The Port of Hastings Corporation are required to prepare an Environment Effects Statement (EES) for the proposed Victorian Renewable Energy Terminal.

The Department of Transport and Planning has convened an inter-agency Technical Reference Group at the request of the Minister for Planning to advise the department and the Port of Hastings Corporation on scoping and adequacy of the EES studies and documentation, as well as coordination of the EES process with other statutory processes for the project.

The TRG’s membership is drawn from government agencies, regional authorities, municipal councils and Registered Aboriginal Parties (RAPs) that have a statutory, policy or technical interest in relation to the project.

The Technical Reference Group is also supported by an Independent Expert Group which consists of technical experts on subject matter relevant to the EES studies for the project.

The Port of Hastings Corporation are in the process of preparing the EES for submission.

=== Commonwealth approvals ===
In 2023, the Port of Hastings Corporation (PoHC) submitted a referral under the EPBC Act for the Victorian Renewable Energy Terminal (the Terminal) Project. Following assessment, the Federal Minister for the Environment determined that the Terminal as proposed in the 2023 Referral would have ‘clearly unacceptable’ impacts. As part of this decision, the Minister provided a ‘Statement of Reasons’ document that outlined why it was determined that the Terminal Project could not proceed.

In response, PoHC undertook extensive scientific assessments, technical studies, and engineering work to substantially modify the project and prepare a new EPBC referral.

In 2025, The Port of Hastings Corporation (PoHC) prepared and lodged a new referral to the Commonwealth Department of Climate Change, Energy, the Environment and Water under the Environment Protection and Biodiversity Conservation (EPBC) Act 1999.

The referral was published on 25 June 2025, following more than 18 months of detailed technical studies, preliminary impact assessments, and significant design refinements.

The preferred design for the Victorian Renewable Energy Terminal has a 70% reduction to the dredging footprint (area) compared to the previous design referred in 2023 to the Commonwealth Government under the Environmental Protection and Biodiversity Conservation (EPBC) Act.

The volume of dredging (quantity) has also been reduced by 45% compared to the previously considered Caisson Quay Wall design option.

=== Commonwealth decision on new EPBC Act referral (2025) ===
On 1 August 2025, the Commonwealth Government published their decision, which determined the proposed Victorian Renewable Energy Terminal project be a Controlled Action.

The decision allows the project to proceed through a bilateral agreement, allowing the State Government (Victoria) to assess the project, reducing duplication of environmental assessment between the Commonwealth and Victoria for matters of national environmental significance.

As part of the new EPBC referral, Port of Hastings Corporation published several Preliminary Impact Assessments and documentation.

According to the Victorian Renewable Energy Terminal project website: "work to date indicates that the impacts from the project will be small, localised and temporary, and found nothing to suggest impacts would be unacceptable."

== Other assets ==
The Port of Hastings also assists in maintaining the BlueScope Steel Wharves, which are owned and operated by BlueScope Steel, the largest private employer on the Mornington Peninsula.

== Controversy over historical management and development of the port ==
The management and development of the Port of Hastings has been a controversial State and local issue for some years.

In 2010, before the creation of the Port of Hastings Corporation, the former Brumby Labor Government conferred responsibility for management and development of the Port of Hastings on the Port of Melbourne Corporation at the same time abolishing the former Port of Hastings Corporation, the agency which had previously managed the port for some years. The "port corporations" at that time - the Port of Melbourne Corporation, the Port of Hastings Corporation and the Victorian Regional Channels Authority - were originally not included in the government's Transport Integration Act 2010 proposal but were added later to that statute by the Transport Legislation Amendment (Ports Integration) Bill 2010 (the Ports Integration Bill).

The Ports Integration Bill was strongly opposed in the Victorian Parliament by the Liberal and National parties, predominantly on competition grounds, and by the Greens for environmental reasons. The bill was defeated in the upper house of the Victorian Parliament, the Legislative Council, but was later passed due to the use of a dispute resolution procedure under the Victorian Constitution. The Council originally defeated the Bill on 22 June 2010. However, on 24 June 2010 the Legislative Assembly referred the bill to the Dispute Resolution Committee of the Parliament. The Assembly returned the bill to the Council for its agreement as recommended by the Dispute Resolution Committee on 27 July 2010. The Legislative Council ultimately rescinded its resolution defeating the second reading of the Bill and the Bill passed on 12 August 2010. The Ports Integration Bill merged the Port of Melbourne Corporation and the former Port of Hastings Corporation under a rebadged Port of Melbourne Corporation banner. The Ports Integration Bill was ultimately proclaimed to commence on 1 September 2010. This formally brought the Port of Melbourne Corporation and the Victorian Regional Channels Authority within the Transport Integration Act 2010 framework on that date.

These developments were, however, largely reversed by the Transport Legislation Amendment (Port of Hastings Development Authority Act) 2011 which created the current Port of Hastings Development Authority and took away the Port of Melbourne Corporation's responsibilities for the port.

== See also ==
- Western Port
- Port of Melbourne Corporation
- Patrick Corporation
- Transport Integration Act 2010
