= McCrae, Victoria =

McCrae
- Suburb
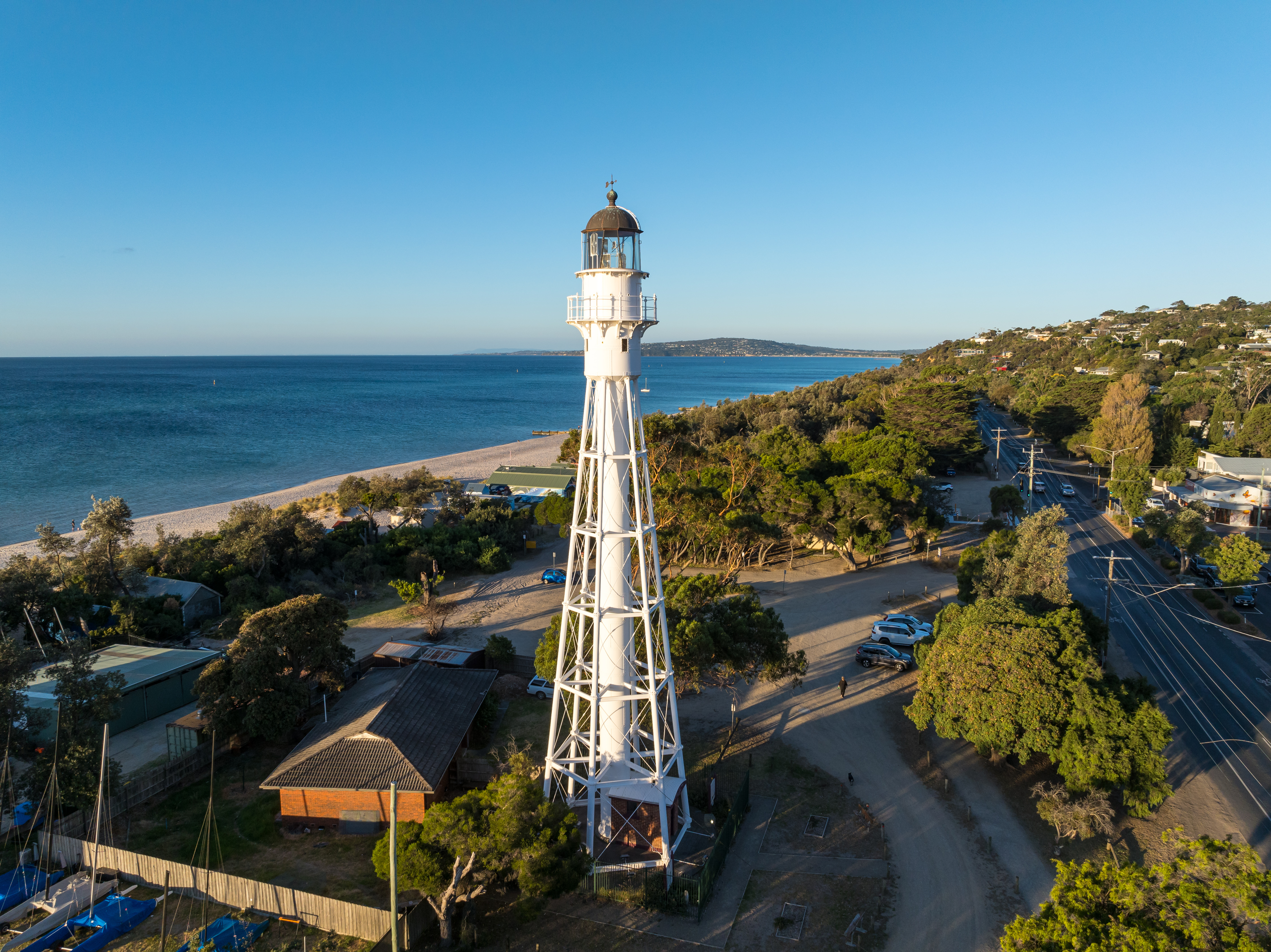
- The former lighthouse at McCrae, viewed from a drone in 2025

- Interactive map of McCrae
- Coordinates: 38.351°S 144.922°E
- Country: Australia
- State: Victoria
- City: Melbourne
- LGA: Shire of Mornington Peninsula
- Location: 75 km (47 mi) from Melbourne; 3 km (1.9 mi) from Rosebud
- Established: 1934

Government
  - State electorate: Nepean
  - Federal division: Flinders

Area
  - Total: 3.7 km^{2} (1.4 sq mi)

Population
  - Total: 3,311 (2021 census)
  - Density: 895/km^{2} (2,320/sq mi)
- Postcode: 3938
Suburbs around McCrae
| | | Dromana |
| | McCrae | Arthurs Seat |
| Rosebud | Rosebud | Main Ridge |

McCrae is a suburb on the Mornington Peninsula in Melbourne, Victoria, Australia, 59 km (37 mi) south of Melbourne's Central Business District, located within the Shire of Mornington Peninsula local government area. McCrae recorded a population of 3,311 at the 2021 census.

McCrae is known for the former lighthouse that marked the turning point for shipping in the main navigational channels between Port Phillip Heads and Melbourne.

== History ==
Between 1861 and 1934 McCrae was originally known as Dromana West, and in 1934, following a century of the McCrae family residing at what was then known as 'Arthurs Seat Homestead' (now 'McCrae Homestead'), the locals petitioned to have the township renamed McCrae.

The lease for the Arthurs Seat run was not obtained in 1834 but in late 1843, Georgianna McCrae did not reside there until mid 1845, and the family lived there for only six years not a century. The Burrell family owned the preemptive right from 1851 until it was subdivided, and shared it among inter-related families: Coburn, Wheeler, Cornell and Bartels as discussed in a comprehensive Coburn family history. Another early resident at Dromana West before that was its name was Edgar Williams who bought the McCrae Cottage at the auction in November 1925 or soon after; he or his wife, Dorothy, named the 40-acre property, "Harbour View".

The Township of Dromana was proclaimed in 1861 and the area west of the never-made Burrell Road (planned to climb the cliff from the Rocks to link with Latrobe Parade where it started the climb to the site of Heronswood) was called the Arthur's Seat Pre-emptive right. The first time Dromana West was used to describe a locality was in 1930, (Note: ROSEBUD. — At a meeting of the progress association it was announced that only six more subscribers were required to have a continuous telephone service. It was suggested interviewing the district inspector with regard to the post office opened near the lighthouse and asking that the name be altered from Dromana West to Arthur's Seat.) after the pre-emptive right had been subdivided, lot 8 being the Arthurs Seat Homestead on 40 acres which was advertised for sale in November 1925 after the death of Miss Kathrine Burrell a few months earlier.

In 1934, the new concrete tower replacing the original timber Eastern Shore Lighthouse was described as being at Dromana West when it was actually south of Dromana; and Heronswood was also wrongly described as being at Dromana West; it was just within Dromana Township. McCrae was first used correctly to describe the former Dromana West in 1941 when tenders were called for this mail run. (Note: 10. Frankston Railway Station and Portsea, via Frankston Post Office, Mount Eliza, Mornington Post Office, Mount Martha, Moat's Corner, Dromana, McCrae, Rosebud, Rosebud West, Rye and Sorrento, twelve times weekly, November, to April, and eleven times weekly, May to October, (inclusive). Mails to leave Frankston at about 6.30 a.m., and leave Portsea on return at about 1 p.m.) The first mention of the McCrae Post Office was in 1945 as part of Forest Edmund (Joe) Wood's General Store.

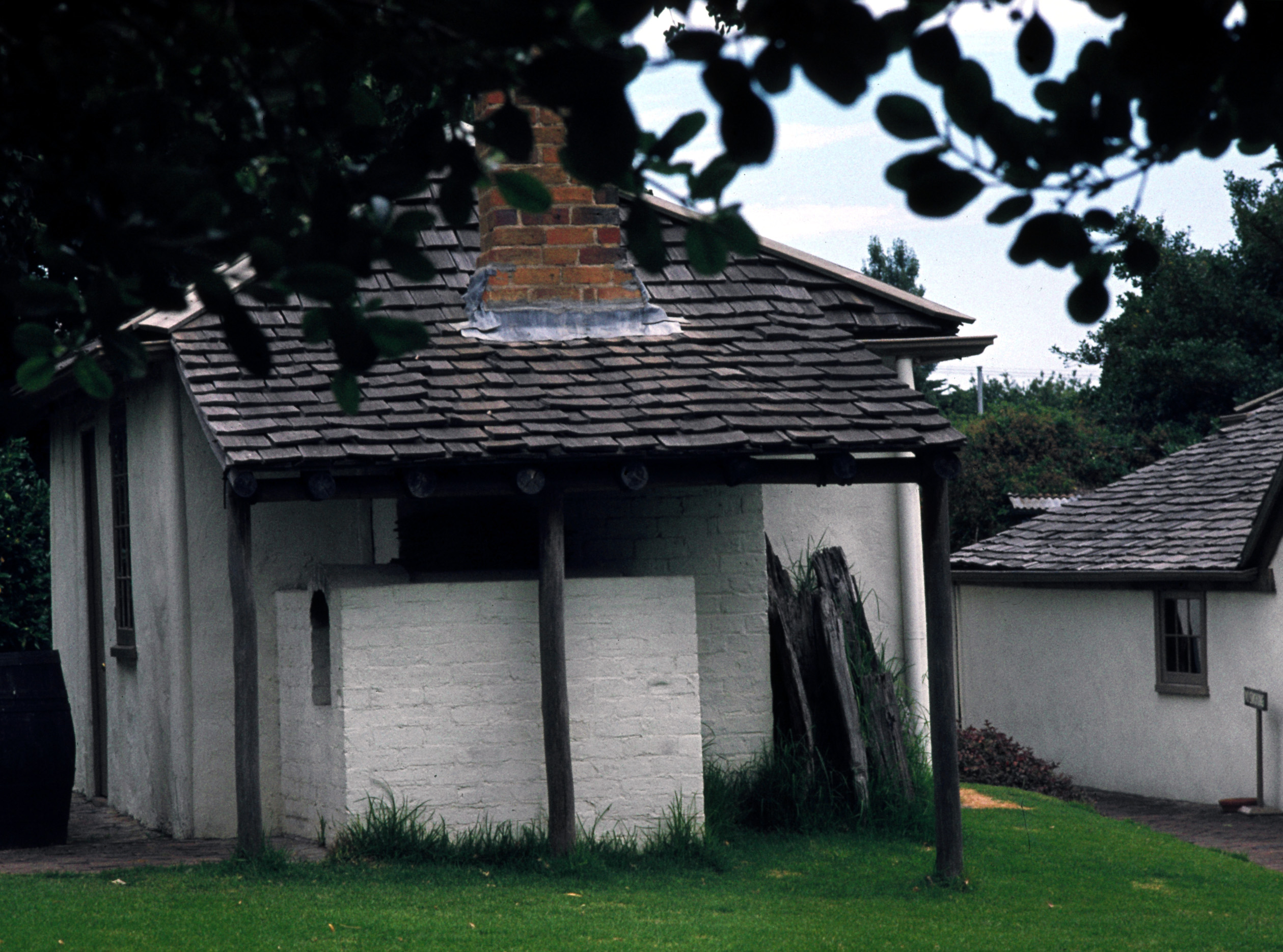
McCrae Homestead in 1979, prior to restoration

Recently a new shopping centre called McCrae Plaza opened, and it included a Bilo Supermarket, which later became a Coles Supermarket.

In March 2011, McCrae Yacht Club hosted the Victorian Championship regattas for the A-Class Catamarans. They sailed seven races from 12 to 14 March.

=== Heritage listings ===
The following places in McCrae are listed on the Victorian Heritage Register:

- Eastern Shore Light (former), 650 Point Nepean Road
- McCrae Homestead, 6–8 Charles Street; owned an operated by the Victorian branch of the National Trust, since 1970, and is open to the public.

== Notable people ==
- Chris Mew (born 1961), a former Australian Rules football player for Hawthorn
- George Gordon McCrae (1833–1927), poet
- Georgiana McCrae (1804–1890), a portrait artist and Victorian-era diarist
- Nikki Osborne (born 1981), an actress and television presenter

== See also ==
- Shire of Flinders – former local government area
