= Appleton Dock =

Coordinates: 37°48′56″S 144°55′25″E

Appleton Dock is an international shipping facility in Melbourne, Victoria, Australia. It was opened in about 1956 by the Melbourne Harbor Trust, and is named after MHT commissioner William Thomas Appleton (1859–1930), who was a staunch advocate of harbour improvements in the early 20th century.

Following the construction of Spencer Street Bridge over the Yarra River in 1929, the wharves on the upper section of the river were blocked to shipping, so the provision of replacement wharfage became necessary. The Harbor Trust had commenced works at the outlet of Moonee Ponds Creek in 1929, which became Appleton Dock. It had been planned since the 1930s but, because of interruptions caused by the Second World War, it was not completed until 1956. At the same time, South Wharf was extended to the west. It handles bulk grain and coal and, since the 1960s, some container shipping.

Appleton Dock berths B, C and D, managed by DP World, are used for general cargo. Appleton Dock E is used for general cargo to and from Tasmania. Appleton Dock F is used for bulk dry cargo, having been reconstructed by joint venture partners Cortex Resources and Walter Construction Pty Ltd, as Australia's premier bulk export terminal, operated by Australian Bulk Alliance (ABA) and AWB (formerly the Australian Wheat Board). The rail sidings to Appleton Dock reopened in 2000, after reconstruction of the Footscray Road crossing, to serve a new export grain terminal.

== See also ==
- Port of Melbourne
- History of Melbourne Docklands
- Australian Amalgamated Terminals
