= Victorian Chamber of Commerce and Industry =

Business organisation in Australia

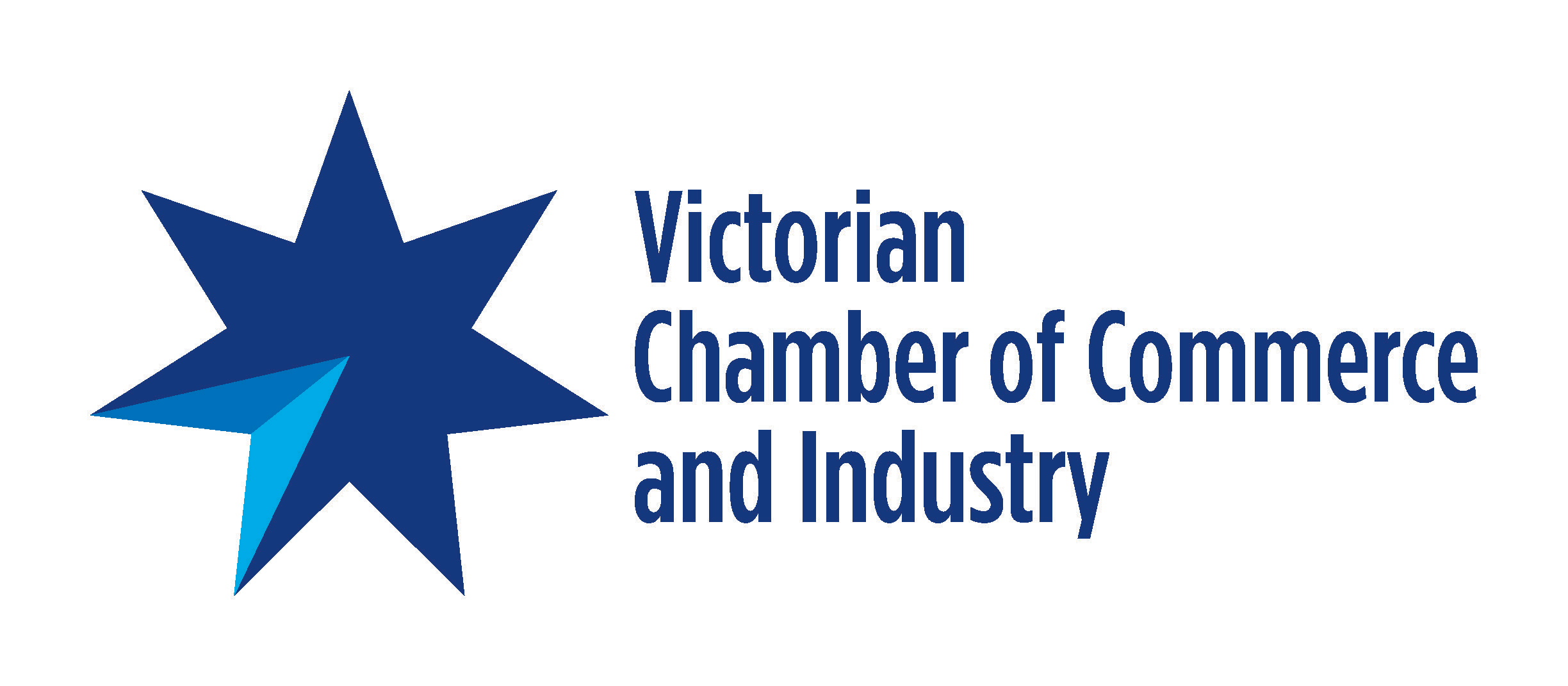
- Formation: 1851
- Type: Non-profit organization
- Location: Melbourne, Australia
- Key people: Paul Guerra, Chief Executive
- Staff: 220
- Website: www.victorianchamber.com.au

The Victorian Chamber of Commerce and Industry (VCCI, a.k.a. Victorian Chamber) is a not-for-profit business organisation in Victoria, Australia. It informs and supports 47,000 members and clients across the state. Founded in 1851 with headquarters in Melbourne, the group is focused on providing policy leadership, information, representation, training and networking opportunities.

The Victorian Chamber employs around 220 staff across its Melbourne, Ballarat, Bendigo, Geelong, Wodonga and Traralgon offices.

== History ==
The Victorian Chamber was founded as the Melbourne Chamber of Commerce in 1851. It was Victoria's first business organisation. The Chamber's members – bankers, accountants, financiers, merchants, importers, lawyers, ship owners and agents, manufacturers and stock, share and product brokers – sought to advance trade and commerce and make Melbourne one of the world's great free ports. It helped to establish the Melbourne Harbor Trust and Marine Board.

In October 1986, the Chamber changed its name to the State Chamber of Commerce and Industry (Victoria), which merged with the Victorian Employers' Federation to become the Victorian Employers Chamber of Commerce and Industry (VECCI) in 1991, serving Victoria's small and medium enterprises.

In 2013, the Victorian Chamber re-established the Melbourne Chamber of Commerce, which specifically caters for Victoria's leading corporations across all sectors of the economy.

In November 2015, the Victorian Chamber underwent a rebrand and the name was changed to the Victorian Chamber of Commerce and Industry, in line with rebrand of the Australian Chamber of Commerce and Industry.

In October 2018, VCCI lobbied to help local companies start exporting to overseas markets.

== Key personnel ==
- President – Adrien Kloeden was appointed President of the Victorian Chamber in 2023, following his previous position as Deputy President. Adrian's management experience covers a wide variety of industries, including forestry, agribusiness, manufacturing, distribution, retail, research and development, brand management, technology, e-commerce, defence and tourism and transport. He has held CEO or leadership positions in large and small public and private companies and a government related organisation and has operated in many regions of the world.
- Deputy President – Jeremy Blackshaw was appointed Deputy President of the Victorian Chamber in 2023. He has extensive corporate practice, advising in multiple jurisdictions across industry sectors such as energy, infrastructure, financial services, health and consumer brands, and energy.
- Chief Executive – Paul Guerra was appointed Chief Executive of the Victorian Chamber in 2019, commencing in 2020. Paul is an internationally experienced leader having held Managing Director/CEO and Chairman level roles across Australia and Asia Pacific, spanning several key industries. Prior to joining the Victorian Chamber, Paul was the Chief Executive of the Royal Agricultural Society of Victoria (RASV).
- Chief Executive, Melbourne Chamber of Commerce – Scott Veenker joined the Victorian Chamber in 2016 after more than 20 years' experience in banking and finance, having held senior positions across multiple distribution channels with Esanda Finance and ANZ.

== Quarterly publications ==
- Business Excellence – quarterly Victorian Chamber and MCC member magazine
- Tourism Excellence – quarterly VTIC and VEIC member magazine
- Survey of Business Trends and Prospects – quarterly results booklet
