= Port of Hastings =

Commercial trading port in Victoria, Australia

Coordinates: 38.372622°S 145.222465°E

The Port of Hastings is a major commercial trading port located on Western Port (bay) in Hastings, Victoria, Australia, approximately 72 kilometres south-east of Melbourne. It is one of Victoria’s four commercial ports and serves as a vital hub for the energy and steel industries, handling bulk liquid, gas, and steel products.

== History ==
=== Early development ===
Western Port has functioned as a trading port since the early 1800s. Due to its naturally deep channel, reaching depths of up to 14 metres without the need for extensive dredging, it was identified in the 1960s as a prime location for industrial development that could supplement the Port of Melbourne.

=== Industrial expansion (1960s–1970s) ===
In the late 1960s, the Victorian Government reserved large tracts of land around Hastings for port-related industrial use.

This period saw the establishment of major facilities, including the BlueScope Steel (formerly BHP) works and the Esso-BHP gas fractionation plant.

These industries relied on the port's deep water access to move heavy steel and petroleum products.

=== Governance changes ===
The management of the port has evolved through several legislative changes:

- 2010: The Transport Legislation Amendment (Ports Integration) Act 2010 briefly merged the Port of Hastings Corporation into the Port of Melbourne Corporation.
- 2012: The Port of Hastings Development Authority (now the Port of Hastings Corporation) was re-established as a standalone entity to focus specifically on the development and operation of Western Port’s facilities.

== Port operations ==
=== Current trade ===
The Port of Hastings Corporation reports an average of 125 vessel per year, with total trade volumes of 1.73 million tones.

The Port of Hastings' current trade groups include import/export of oil, liquid petroleum gas (LPG), steel, aviation fuel and unleaded petrol (ULP).

In the 1970s the potential of Western Port was identified for the establishment of large-scale process industries, which require both deep water and extensive land adjacent to a port. Areas were identified to be set aside for port purposes so that the State's options about any future port development at Western Port could be preserved.

The Port of Hastings has continued to safely operate, catering for both bulk liquid and gas trades, and in recent years, the Port of Hastings has been selected by the Victorian Government as the preferred location for the Victorian Renewable Energy Terminal, which presents an opportunity for a new chapter for the Port.

== Management ==
Since 2012, the port has been managed by the Port of Hastings Corporation, a public entity established in January 2012 under the Transport Integration Act (2010).

As the Port Operator for Western Port Bay, they are responsible for managing the operations at the Port of Hastings, including maintaining the associated port infrastructure (except for the BlueScope owned steel wharves). This also includes responsibility for infrastructure maintenance and security. Maritime safety, navigation aids, and channel management are overseen by Ports Victoria.

== Facilities ==
The port consists of several distinct precincts and specialised jetties:

Facility	Ownership	Primary Use
Long Island Point Jetty	State Government	Export of Gippsland crude oil and LPG (Esso Australia).
Crib Point Jetty	State Government	Import of refined hydrocarbons and fuel (United Petroleum).
BlueScope Steel Wharves	BlueScope Steel	Import/export of steel products (Berths 1 and 2).
Stony Point Jetty	State Government	Support for tugs, ferries (to French/Phillip Islands), and RAN training.

== Future expansion ==
=== Proposed Victorian renewable energy terminal ===
On September 10 2023, the Victorian State Government announced that the Port of Hastings is the preferred location for the establishment of a dedicated assembly port to support the construction of Victoria's first offshore wind farms along the Victorian coast.

The Victorian Government has identified the Victorian Renewable Energy Terminal as critical to supporting the state's target of achieving net zero emissions by 2045.

The media release noted: "There is currently no port in Australia that can facilitate large scale offshore wind construction, and this major development from the Labor Government will deliver critical, nation-leading enabling infrastructure."

The Victorian Renewable Energy Terminal is proposed at the Old Tyabb Reclamation Area (OTRA) and the adjacent marine area. The OTRA is a 25-hectare land area located in the existing port precinct between the Esso's Long Island Point jetty and the BlueScope Steel wharves.

Once operational, the site would be equipped for the receival, assembly and installation of offshore wind foundations, towers and turbines as a multi-user facility, with berthing facilities, heavy duty pavements and major supporting infrastructure.

== Environmental context ==
Unlike the man-made docks of Melbourne, the Port of Hastings operates within the ecologically sensitive waters of Western Port. Much of the bay is protected under the Ramsar international treaty for wetlands. The port is situated within the UNESCO Mornington Peninsula and Western Port Biosphere Reserve.
