= Queenscliff High Light =

Lighthouse in Victoria, Australia

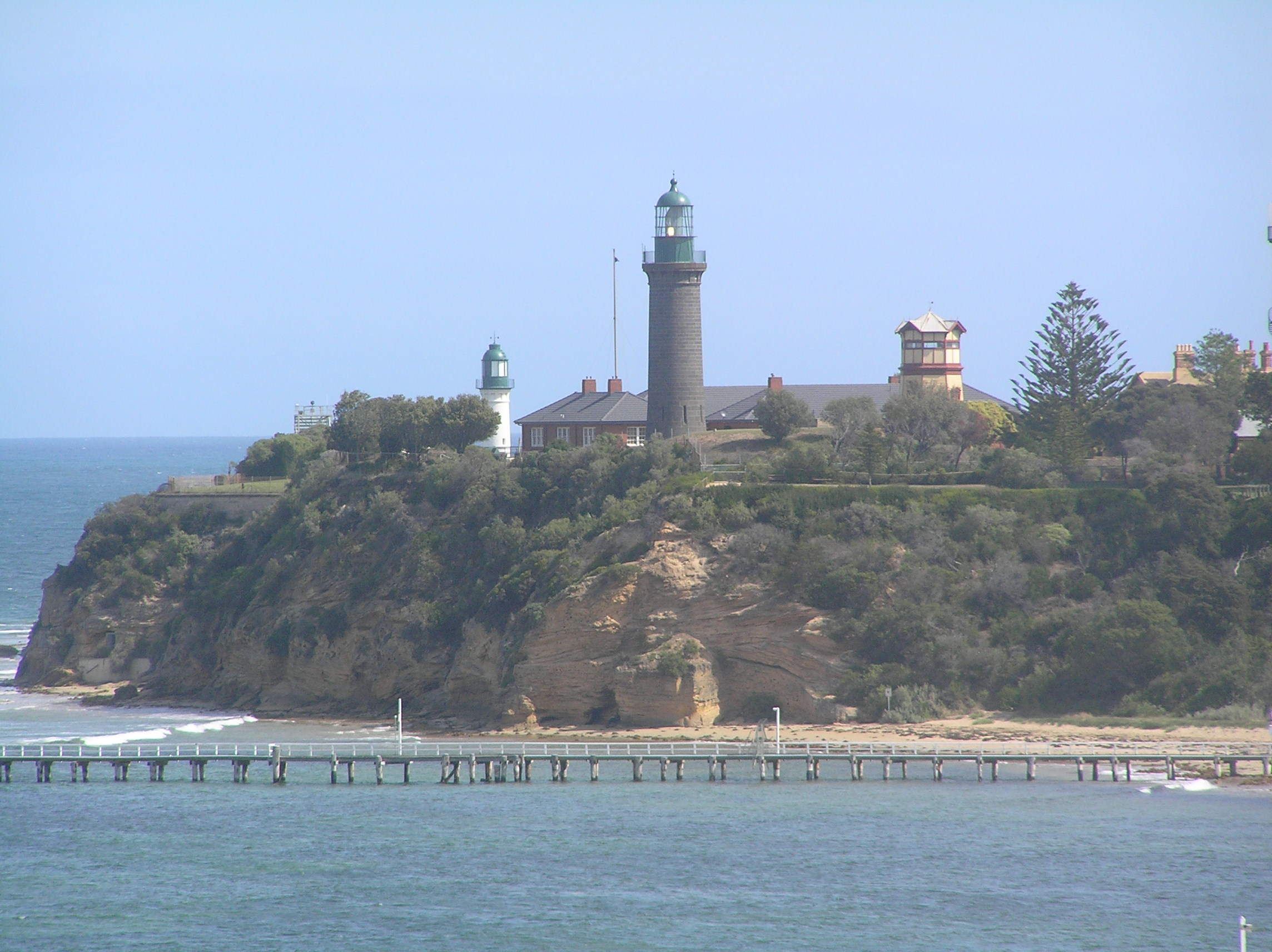
- Queenscliff High Light
- Location: Port Phillip; Victoria; Australia
- Coordinates: 38°16′17.6″S 144°39′42.6″E

Tower
- Constructed: 1843 (first)
- Construction: bluestone tower
- Height: 18 metres (59 ft)
- Shape: cylindrical tower with balcony and lantern
- Markings: unpainted stone tower and green lantern and balcony
- Power source: mains electricity
- Operator: Port of Melbourne Corporation

Light
- First lit: 1862 (current)
- Focal height: 40 metres (130 ft)
- Range: 14 nautical miles (26 km)
- Characteristic: either F W or Oc. W 15s. depending on bearing

The Queenscliff High Light, also variously known as the Black Lighthouse, Fort Queenscliff Lighthouse or Shortland Bluff Light, stands in the grounds of Fort Queenscliff in Queenscliff, Victoria, Australia. It is one of four black lighthouses in the world, and the only one in the Southern Hemisphere. Together with the nearby white Queenscliff Low Light, it was built in 1862 to replace the former sandstone lighthouse of 1843 on the same site which was underpowered and deteriorating.

The lightsource is located 40 metres above sea level (focal plane). Depending on the tower's bearing it emits either a fixed light or an occulting signal with an interval of 15 seconds. The black lighthouse is one of four in Queenscliff that are used as a leading line to guide ships through the notoriously dangerous mouth of Port Phillip Bay.

== History ==
There are several conflicting accounts about the source of the basalt for the building. One version states that it came from Scotland as a ship's ballast. In another version, the stone was quarried in Melbourne and shipped to Queenscliff. The fact that the stone was shipped may have led to the conception of the former theory. A third version, according to current tour guides, is that the entire lighthouse was cut in Scotland, transported, and assembled on-site by numbers.

The lighthouse was certainly designed in Scotland. Strangely, although Shortland Bluff, on which it is built, is 20m or more above sea level, it was designed as a wave-washed lighthouse, with curved walls to deflect shock from waves, and with an entrance 5m above the base, which is still visible. That entrance was used, via a rope ladder, for the first ten years until a ground-level door was cut.

Fort Queenscliff was built around the lighthouse during the Victorian Gold Rush, following concerns that ships carrying gold might be susceptible to attack from privateers. The light was converted to gas in 1890, and then to electricity in 1924. It is supposed that the first public telephone service in Victoria was installed there. Today, the lighthouse is unmanned and automated, and is serviced by the Port of Melbourne Corporation.

== Reference to The Lighthouse ==
Henry Handel Richardson's book The Getting of Wisdom describes a ferry trip that bypasses the lighthouse in the late 1800s, although Richardson describes the lighthouse as made of granite, not basalt.

Then the boat stood to sea again and sailed past high, grass-grown cliffs, from which a few old cannons, pointing their noses at you, watched over the safety of the Bay—in the event, say, of the Japanese or the Russians entering the Heads past the pretty township, and the beflagged bathing-enclosures on the beach below. They neared the tall, granite lighthouse at the point, with the flagstaff at its side where incoming steamers were signalled; and as soon as they had rounded this corner they were in view of the Heads themselves. From the distant cliffs there ran out, on either side, brown reefs, which made the inrushing water dance and foam, and the entrance to the Bay narrow and dangerous: on one side, there projected the portion of a wreck which had lain there as long as Laura had been in the world. Then, having made a sharp turn to the left, the boat crossed to the opposite coast, and steamed past barrack-like buildings lying asleep in the fierce sunshine of the afternoon; and, in due course, it stopped at Laura's destination.

== See also ==
- List of lighthouses in Australia
- Wuqiu Lighthouse, black lighthouse in Taiwan (ROC)
