= WTC Wharf =

Coordinates: 37.822378°S 144.953732°E

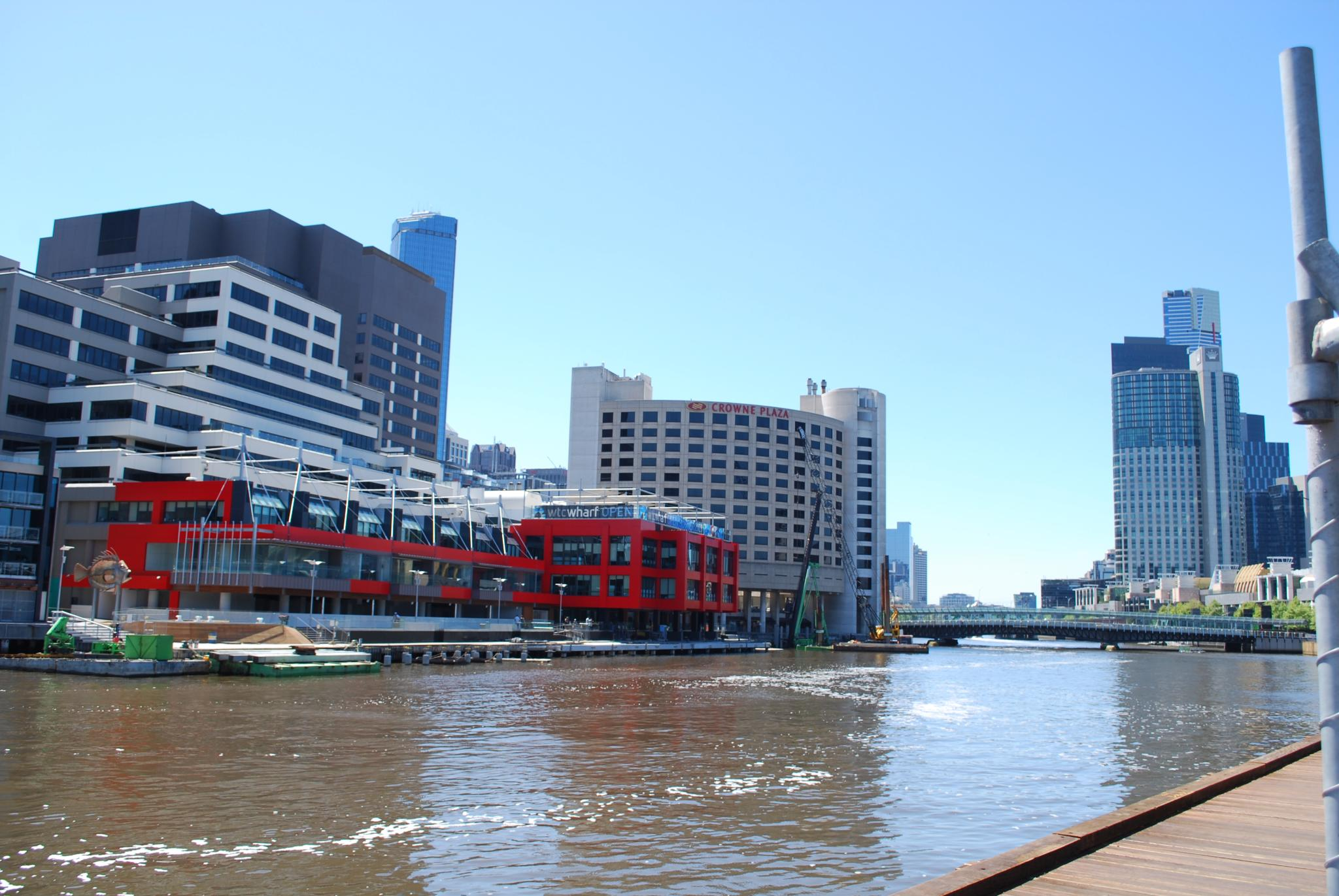
WTC Wharf from South Wharf, Docklands, Melbourne.

WTC Wharf (formerly the World Trade Centre and WTC Northbank) is a twelve-storey office complex on the north bank of the Yarra River in Melbourne, Australia.

== History ==
On 19 December 1978, the Government of Victoria passed the Port of Melbourne (World Trade Centre) Act 1978, vesting the Port of Melbourne Authority with authority to construct, maintain and operate a World Trade Centre in the Port of Melbourne. The centre, an example of Brutalist architecture, was built in the early 1980s and opened in 1983.

On 30 June 1994, Melbourne's first casino, Crown Casino opened in the World Trade Centre. The location was a temporary measure while Crown's permanent home, the Crown Casino and Entertainment Complex was constructed across the Yarra river at Southbank In 1997, the centre hosted a temporary exhibition of waxworks from the Madame Tussauds wax museum in London.

== Current use ==
The building currently houses some offices of the headquarters of Victoria Police, and the Victoria Police Museum, a collection of exhibits and memorabilia from over 150 years of policing in Victoria. It also houses offices for companies, including Thales Australia. The WTC shopping centre is undergoing redevelopment, including the proposed installation of an environmentally friendly air-conditioning system using water from the Yarra River. Further redevelopment plans include construction of restaurants, cafes, a hotel, a wine store, a function centre, and a health and beauty centre.
