= Port of Melbourne Corporation =

The Port of Melbourne Corporation (PoMC) is a statutory body established by the Victorian Government to develop and manage the Port of Melbourne, Australia's busiest container port. The Corporation commenced operations on 1 July 2003, when it took over the management of the port from the Melbourne Port Corporation. On 1 September 2010, the corporation was re-established with a new charter under the Transport Integration Act.

== History ==
The Melbourne Harbour Trust was established in 1877 after several boards of inquiry to improve access for shipping to Melbourne. The Trust engaged the British engineer Sir John Coode to advise on port improvements. Coode produced a scheme involving a large dock basin (Victoria Dock), and was straightening the river through a new cut (now known as the Coode Canal. Dredging and dock construction began in 1880, with the canal opening to shipping in 1886, Victoria Dock opening in 1896 and dock-work and continued into the 1920s.

The North and South Wharves were extended downstream, and in the 1930s–50s Appleton Dock was constructed, followed by Swanson Dock, and Webb Dock.

In 1978 the Harbour Trust was reformed as the Port of Melbourne Authority, moving from its Market Street head office to the World Trade Centre (Melbourne) in 1983. The Port of Melbourne Corporation was formed on 1 July 2003, taking over the former Melbourne Port Corporation, and the Victorian Channels Authority.

== Port operations ==
The Port of Melbourne Corporation administers the Yarra River downstream of Bolte Bridge, and operates several wharfs and piers on the Yarra River and Port Melbourne that comprise the Port of Melbourne. The Port of Melbourne is Australia's largest container and general cargo port, handling around 37% of the nation's container trade. More than forty shipping lines, make around 3100 ship calls a year to Melbourne, providing services to ports in all major parts of the world. The port is at the north of Port Phillip Bay. It is serviced by more than 100 nautical miles of shipping channels and fairways between the Port Phillip Heads and the berths on the Yarra River, at Williamstown and Station Pier, Port Melbourne.

With more than 3100 commercial ship calls each year at the port, Melbourne provides access to more than 300 ports of call across the globe. In 2009-10, the ten main containerised commodity exports, in decreasing quantity, were: miscellaneous manufactures, cereal grains, beverages, dairy products, fruit & vegetables, paperboards & fibreboards, pulp & wastepaper, timber, stockfeed, paper & newsprint. In 2009-10, the ten main containerised commodity imports, in decreasing quantity, were: miscellaneous manufactures, furniture, electrical equipment, paper & newsprint, fruit & vegetables, machinery, clothing, vehicle parts, metal manufactures, rubber manufactures.

The Port of Melbourne posted record trade in October and November 2011. The total trade through the Port of Melbourne grew 7.3% over the same period in 2011—setting a monthly record of 7.81 million revenue tonnes.

== Governance ==
=== Initial establishment ===
The Corporation was initially established on 1 July 2003 under the Port Services Act 1995 (Victoria) to manage the Port of Melbourne, a port for containerised and general cargo located in Melbourne, Victoria, Australia.

The Corporation took over management of the Port of Melbourne from the Melbourne Port Corporation, which ceased operations on 30 June 2003. On 3 November 2003, it took over responsible for the port waters and channels from the Victorian Channels Authority.

=== Re-establishment under the Transport Integration Act ===
The Port of Melbourne Corporation was re-established with a new corporate charter on 1 September 2010 on the commencement of ports-related changes to the Transport Integration Act and changes made to that Act by the Transport Legislation Amendment (Ports Integration) Act 2010.

The Transport Integration Act establishes a framework for an integrated and sustainable transport system in Victoria and empowers key Victorian Government agencies with responsibility for the State's land and water transport system.

The Act provides that Port of Melbourne Corporation's primary object is to manage and develop its ports consistent with the vision statement in the Act and system-based objectives which emphasise transport integration and sustainability. More specifically, the Corporation is required—

- to ensure, in collaboration with relevant responsible bodies, that the port of Melbourne is effectively integrated with the transport system and other systems of infrastructure in the State;
- to facilitate the sustainable growth of trade through the port;
- to ensure that essential port services of the port are available and cost effective;
- to establish and manage channels in port of Melbourne waters for use on a fair and reasonable basis;
- to plan for the development and operation of the port;
- to provide land, waters and infrastructure necessary for the development and operation of the port;
- to develop, or enable and control the development by others of, the whole or any part of the port;
- to manage, or enable and control the management by others of, the whole or any part of the port;
- to provide, or enable and control the provision by others of, services for the operation of the port;
- to facilitate the integration of infrastructure and logistics systems in the port with the transport system and other relevant systems outside the port;
- to manage and, in accordance with standards developed by the Director, Transport Safety, to dredge and maintain channels in port of Melbourne waters;
- to provide and maintain, in accordance with the standards developed by the Director, Transport Safety, navigation aids in connection with navigation in port of Melbourne waters;
- to generally direct and control the movement of vessels in port waters.

The 2010 legislative changes abolished the Port of Hastings Corporation and transferred its responsibilities for the Port of Hastings to the Port of Melbourne Corporation. These developments were reversed on 1 January 2012 with the establishment of the Port of Hastings Development Authority.

== See also ==
- Transport Integration Act
- Port of Hastings Development Authority
