= Mount Fraser =

Mount Fraser can refer to:

- Mount Fraser (Australia)
- Mount Fraser (Canada)
- Mount Fraser (South Georgia)

== See also ==
- Mount Frazier (disambiguation)
