= Merri Creek =

Waterway in Victoria, Australia

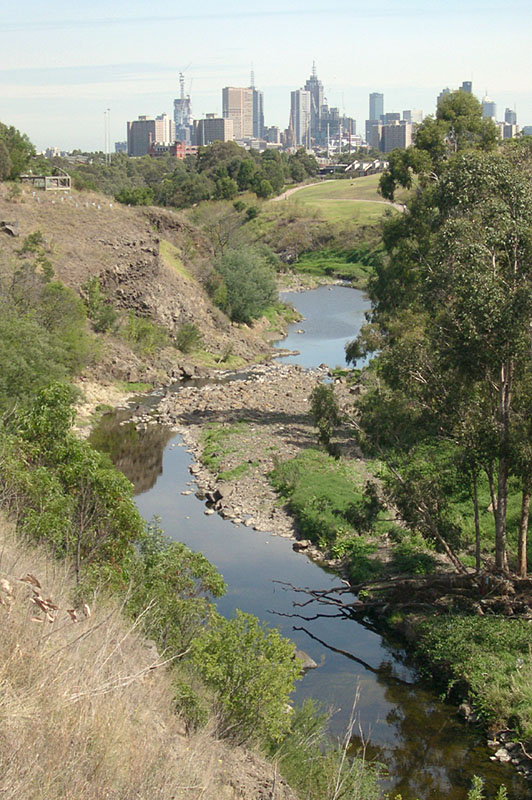
- The Merri Creek passing through Fairfield and Clifton Hill with Melbourne city skyline in the distance.

Location
- Country: Australia
- State: Victoria

Physical characteristics
- Length: 70 km (43 mi)
- Basin size: Unknown

Merri Creek is a waterway in southern parts of Victoria, Australia, which flows through the northern suburbs of Melbourne. It begins near Wallan and flows south for 70 km until joining the Yarra River at Dights Falls. The area where the creek meets the river was traditionally the location for large gatherings of the Wurundjeri people and is thought to have been the location for one of the earliest land treaties in Australia between Indigenous Australians and European settlers.

The creek was the site of heavy industrial use throughout much of the 20th century, being home to quarries, landfills and accepting waste runoff from neighbouring factories. This has degraded the riparian ecology of the creek leaving behind pollutants such as heavy metals and various greases. Recent decades have seen some regenerative planting and the foundation of several community groups dedicated to protecting and regenerating the creek's ecology.

== Etymology ==
In the 1800s, John Batman described a “lovely stream of water” believed to be Merri Creek, but did not give it a name. It was known for a time as Lucy's Creek, apparently after Batman's daughter. A map dated to 1893 indicated a "Merri Merri Creek", which was shortened later to "Merri Creek." Some believe it means “very rocky” or “very stony” to symbolise the volcanic history of the site. The phrase is said to originate from the Woiwurrung language, but its authenticity is disputed by historians and Indigenous Elders.

== Geography ==
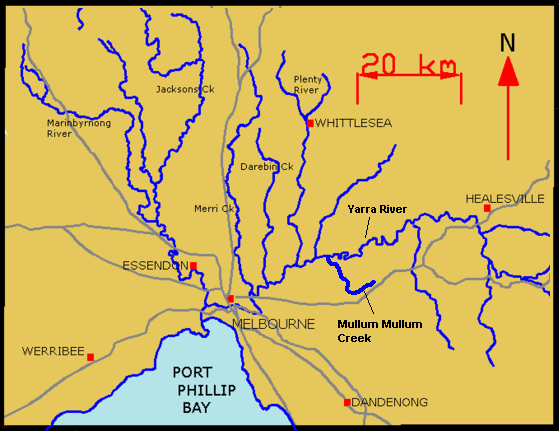
The Yarra River and its tributaries

Over 400 million years ago. the sea covering the area receded, leaving behind a layer of yellowish marine siltstone and sandstone rocks. Around 66 million years ago, non-marine sediments left a sandy layer behind. Over time, the ancestral valley of the Merri Creek developed, eroding through these sediments. Then, from 4.6 to 0.8 million years ago, volcanoes such as Hayes Hill (about 5 km east of Donnybrook) and Mount Fraser (near Beveridge) erupted, sending lava on a journey along the ancestral valleys of the Merri and Darebin Creeks and into the valley of the Yarra River as far as the Melbourne CBD. The modern day Merri Creek was formed over many years by incising through the lava surface.

Today, the creek begins in Wallan and flows in a southerly direction for 70 km until it joins the Yarra River in Fairfield near Dights Falls and subsequently flows into Port Phillip Bay. Its tributaries include Wallan Creek, Mittagong Creek, Taylors Creek, Malcolm Creek, Aitken Creek, Curly Sedge Creek, Central Creek, Merlynston Creek and Edgars Creek. It flows through, or forms a part of the borders between the suburbs of Wallan, Kalkallo, Donnybrook, Craigieburn, Wollert, Epping, Somerton, Campbellfield, Lalor, Thomastown, Fawkner, Reservoir, Coburg North, Coburg, Preston, Thornbury, Brunswick East, Northcote, Westgarth, Fitzroy North, Clifton Hill and Fairfield before meeting the Yarra River just upstream of Dights Falls.

=== Rocky cliff face ===
One of the many sites of geological interest along the Merri valley is the rocky cliff face on the eastern side of Merri Creek visible from the shared path in Clifton Hill. Its tall, cracked (or jointed) basalt columns, formed by cooling lava, are clearly visible and the weathering evident in the rocky riffles midstream where columns have collapsed and tumbled into the stream. Some of the vertical fractures at the top of the cliff appear to be leaning, forming a striking radial pattern.

=== Flora and fauna ===
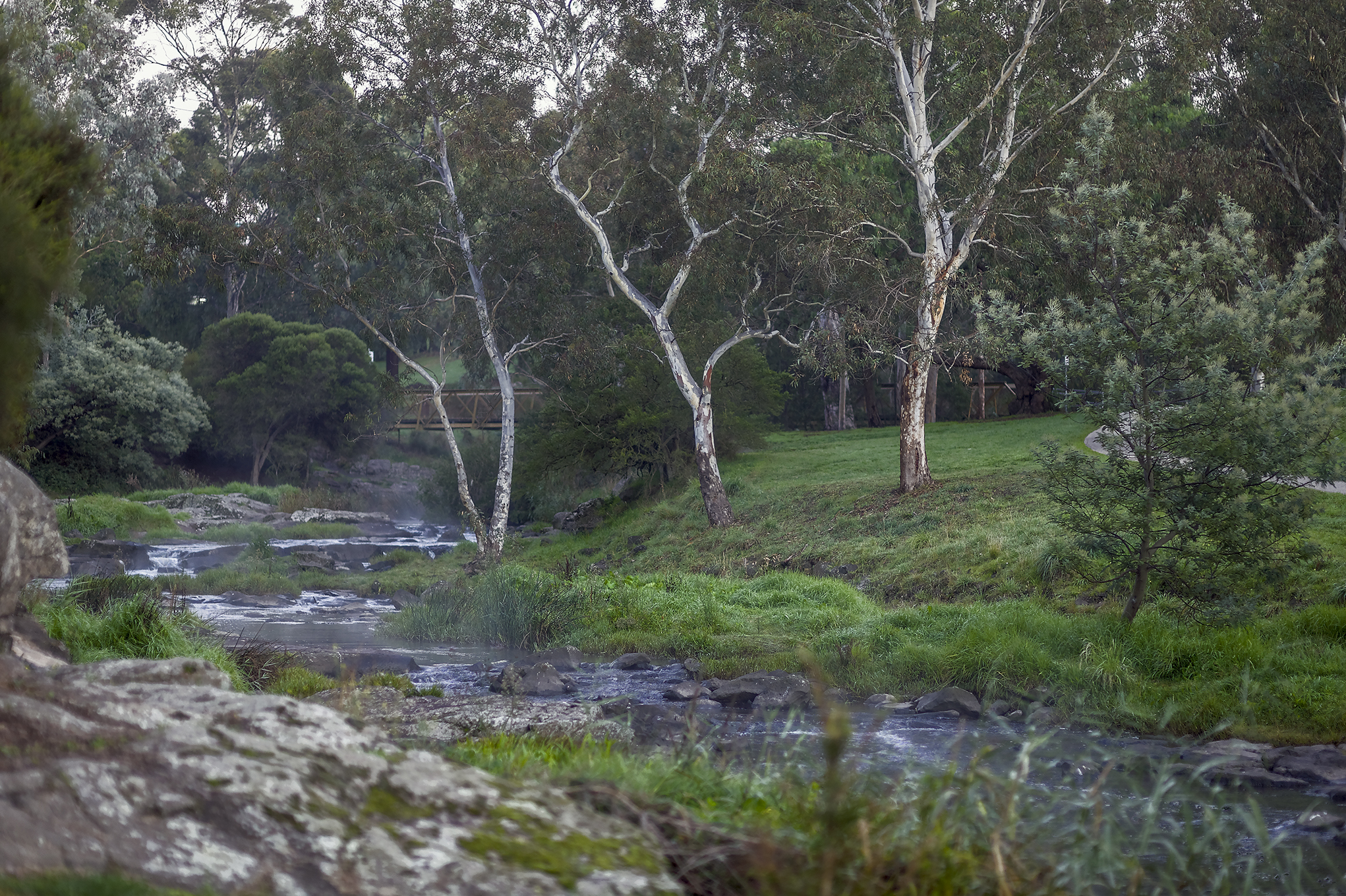
Merri Creek at Lake Reserve Coburg April 2021

As native vegetation has been regenerated, some species of native wildlife have returned to the creek. These include kookaburras, kingfishers, yellow-tailed Black Cockatoos, echdidnas and frogs. There have also been reports of platypuses in the upper northern regions and further south in Coburg.

Merri Creek is also abundant in edible plants, although care should be taken when attempting to identify them. including dandelion, dock, fennel, jerusalem artichoke, numerous brassicas, blackberry nightshade, sorrel, catsear, sowthistle, nettle and many others. Caution is advisable when harvesting fennel and other members of the family Apiaceae, as poison hemlock has been found growing in some areas of the creek.

== History ==
The large number of pre and post-contact archaeological sites demonstrate a heavy usage of the area by Indigenous Australians. The creek and surrounding valley was the site of many large gatherings of Aboriginal people and is thought to be the site of one of the earliest land treaties between Aboriginals and Europeans.

=== Archaeology ===
Many archaeological sites found contain scattered stone artefacts from old campsites, and scarred trees from which traditional people removed slabs of bark to make canoes, containers and shields. The artefact scatters are found because erosion of some sort has exposed the implements which were covered with sediment. The scarred trees are often on the creek bank, fence line or road reserve where they escaped the clearance process. Both site types exhibit traces of the hunting and gathering lifestyle of pre-contact Victoria, and are a fragile and non-renewable historical resource. Aboriginal sites are protected under the Aboriginal Heritage Act 2006.

=== Pre-European ===
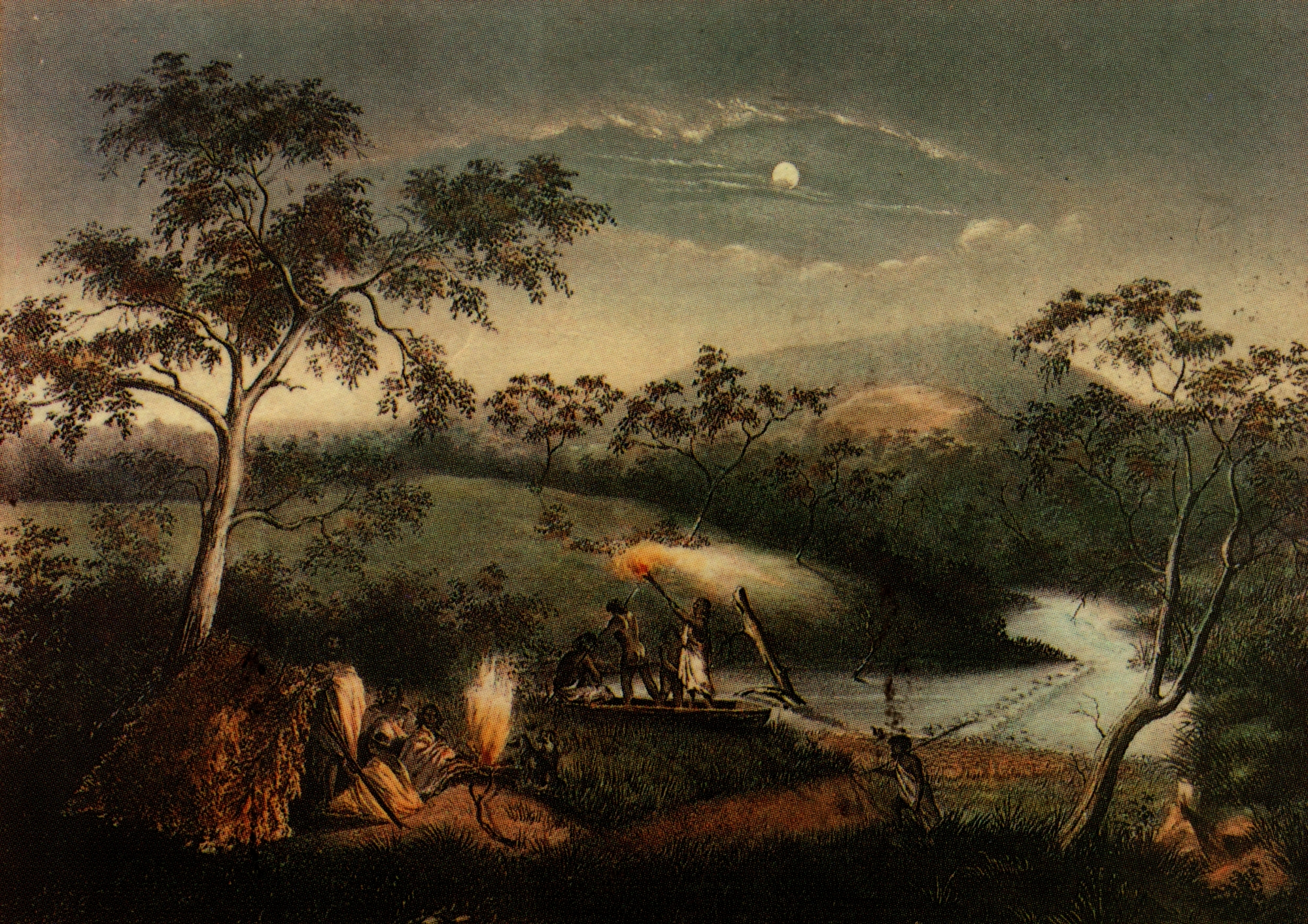
Aboriginal on Merri Creek by Charles Troedel, 1865

The northern suburbs of Melbourne are built on the unceded land of the Wurundjeri-willam people. During the first years of European colonisation, the Wurundjeri were represented by influential senior men such as Billibellary. His clan lived on the northern bank of the Yarra and their territory extended from Yarra Bend northwards along the Merri Creek.

The creek supplied the Wurundjeri-willam with an abundance of food such as eel, fish, and duck. Women waded through the Merri with string bags suspended around their neck, searching the bottom of the stream for shellfish. Emu and kangaroo were hunted in the surrounding grasslands. In the forests and hills, possum was also a staple source of food and clothing, The flesh of the possum was cooked and eaten, while the skin was saved to be sewn into valuable waterproof cloaks.

=== Post-European ===
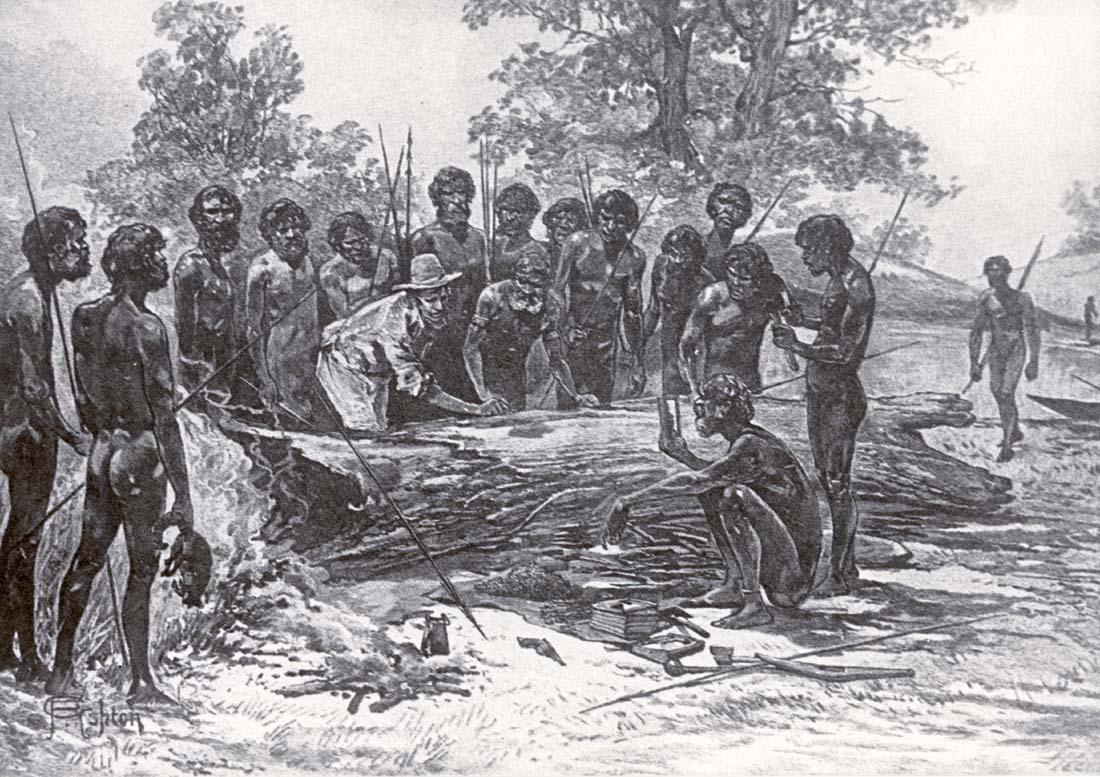
1880s impression of the Treaty being signed

In May 1835, a historic meeting took place between Batman and the Wurundjeri-willam and other clans in which a document was signed that came to be called Batman's Treaty. To date, this remains the only treaty ever struck between European settlers and the Indigenous people of Australia. Batman wrote that these negotiations took place beside a "lovely stream of water" which historians now suspect to be the Merri Creek. This treaty was declared invalid by Sir Richard Bourke, the Governor of N.S.W., who was unwilling to recognize and allow the Indigenous people the right to use and control their own land as they saw fit - thus implementing the doctrine of terra nullius.

In January 1844, the Wurundjeri-willam hosted an immense gathering of Indigenous people who came from all over central Victoria. An estimated 800 people journeyed to the district to witness important judicial proceedings carried out according to traditions of Aboriginal law.

Since European settlement, the lower reaches of the creek have been significantly degraded by human activity. In the early history of Melbourne, numerous quarries were established along the creek to extract bluestone for the construction of many of the city's buildings and paving for roads and lanes. These quarries were later used as landfill for waste. Numerous environmental weeds, such as prickly pear and weeping willows, invaded the banks. Stormwater from suburban streets also drains directly into the creek, bringing rubbish and other pollutants.

=== Recent years ===
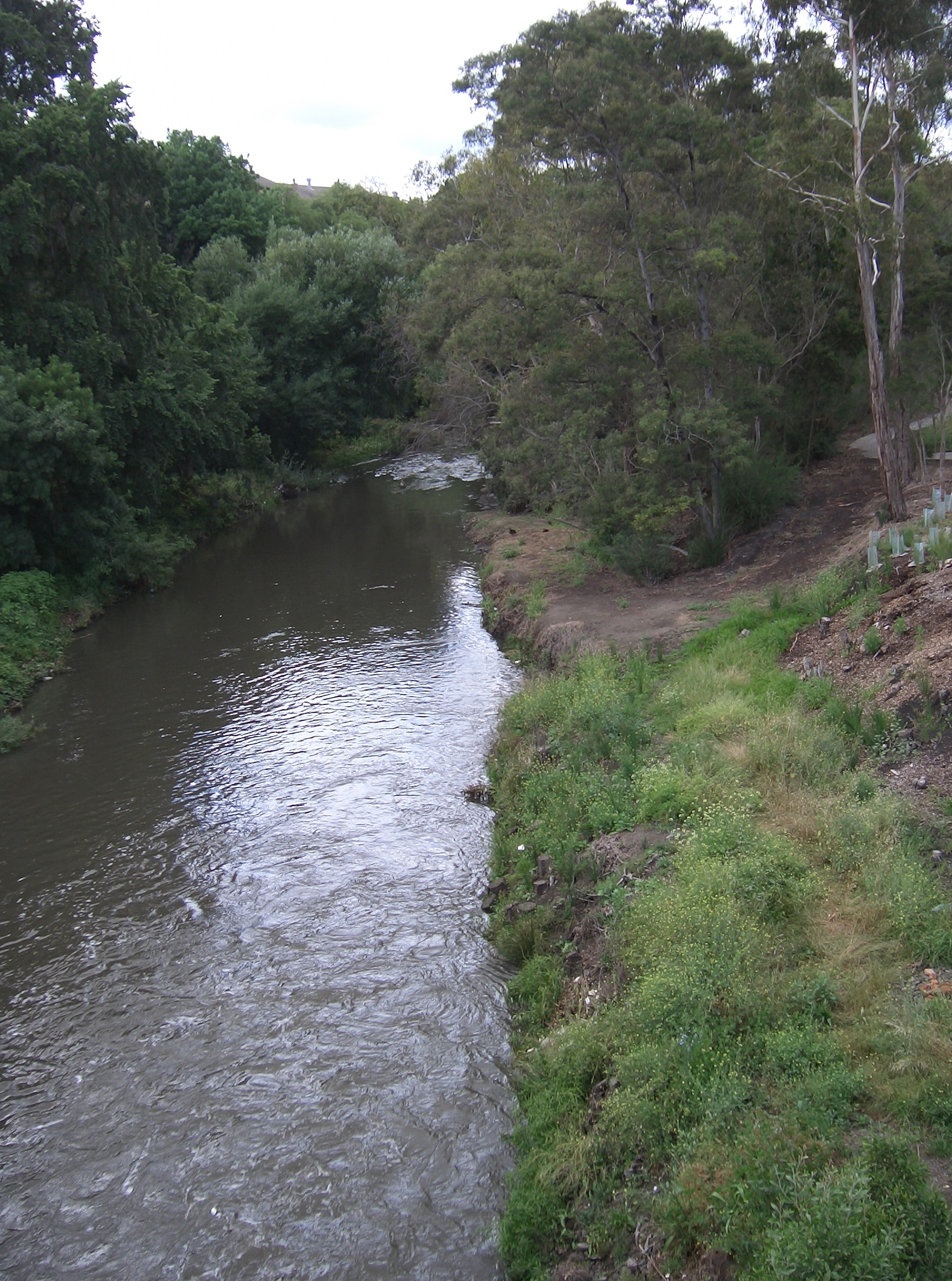
Evidence of revegetation is visible on the right-hand bank of the river.

In recent decades, much has been done to remedy the creek's condition. As recently as the 1980s, the community considered Merri Creek little more than a weed-choked industrial drain. Things have improved significantly since then, largely thanks to the efforts of local community groups. Today it is a popular destination for residents taking walks and other leisure activities, and is considered a "green oasis" in the northern suburbs.

Patches of remnant native flora still remain along the creek, and their quality has improved through weed control and ecological burning. Much native vegetation has been replanted by the Merri Creek Management Committee and the volunteer group Friends of Merri Creek.

Melbourne Water has been involved in a willow control program to improve water flows and allow for the revegetation of sites with indigenous plant species. At times of low flow, water is sustained in the creek through treated outfall from the Craigieburn sewage treatment plant, .

Water quality was thought to have been insufficient to allow repopulation by platypus, as industrial toxicants have reduced macroinvertebrate productivity to the point where there is insufficient food. However, the first platypus sighting in decades occurred between Thornbury and Coburg in September 2010. Platypus sightings have continued, albeit on a "few and far between" basis, ever since.

== Parks and recreation ==
Parks Victoria manages some of the established parklands on the banks of Merri Creek. Facilities include football and cricket ovals, tennis courts and playgrounds. The Merri Creek Trail shared pathway has been established along the banks to take advantage of the improving environment, but the path is broken at Westgarth and North Fitzroy, necessitating traversing St George's Road. The CERES Community Environment Park - a community-run farming initiative with plenty of public spaces, cafes and markets - is a popular destination for Melburnians located adjacent to the Merri Creek. The Merri Creek Labyrinth, a circular labyrinth made of stone, is located just off the adjoining trail in Clifton Hill.

== Gallery ==
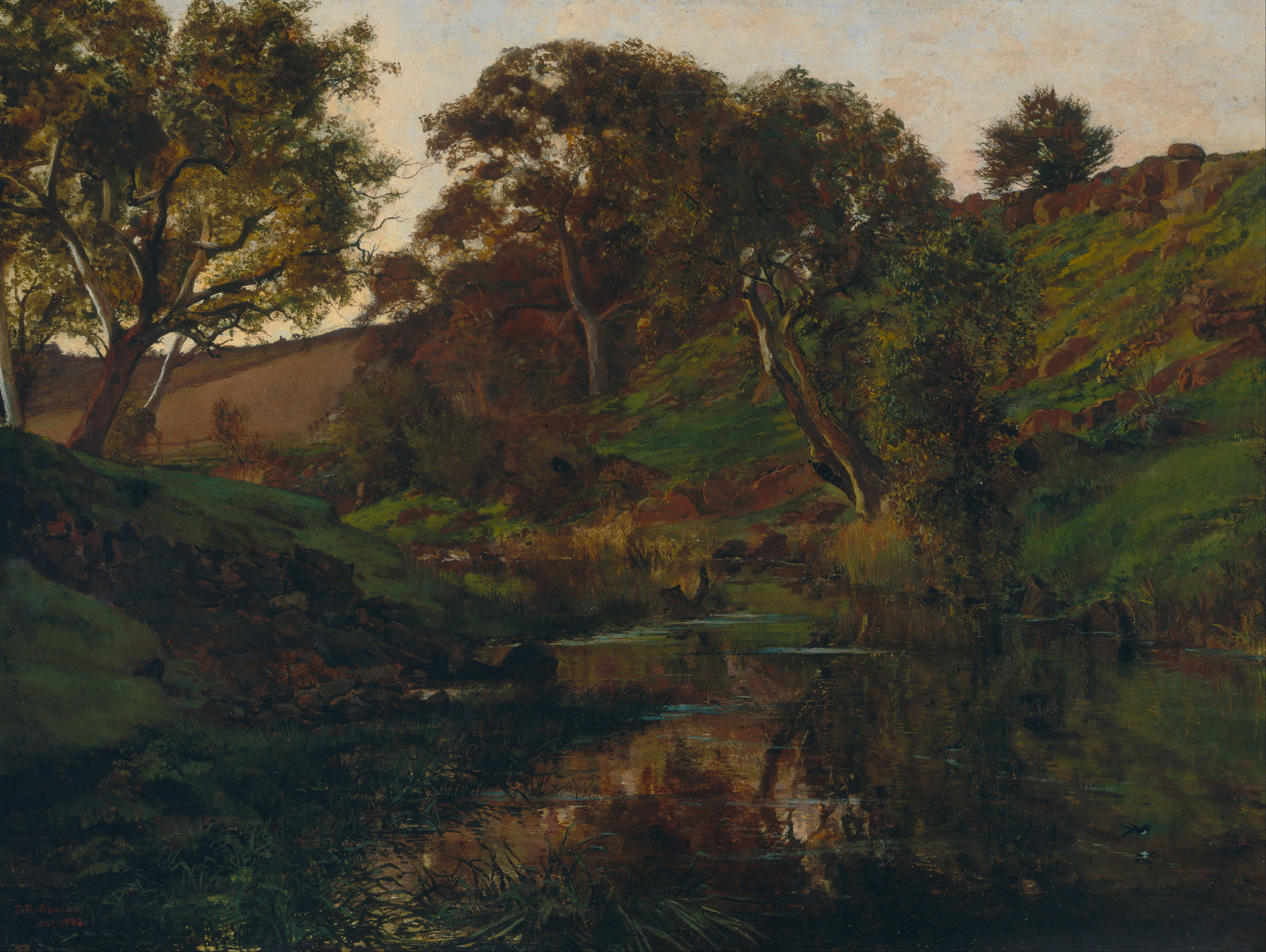
Evening, Merri Creek, painted by Julian Ashton in 1882, is reputedly the first true plein air painting done in Australia

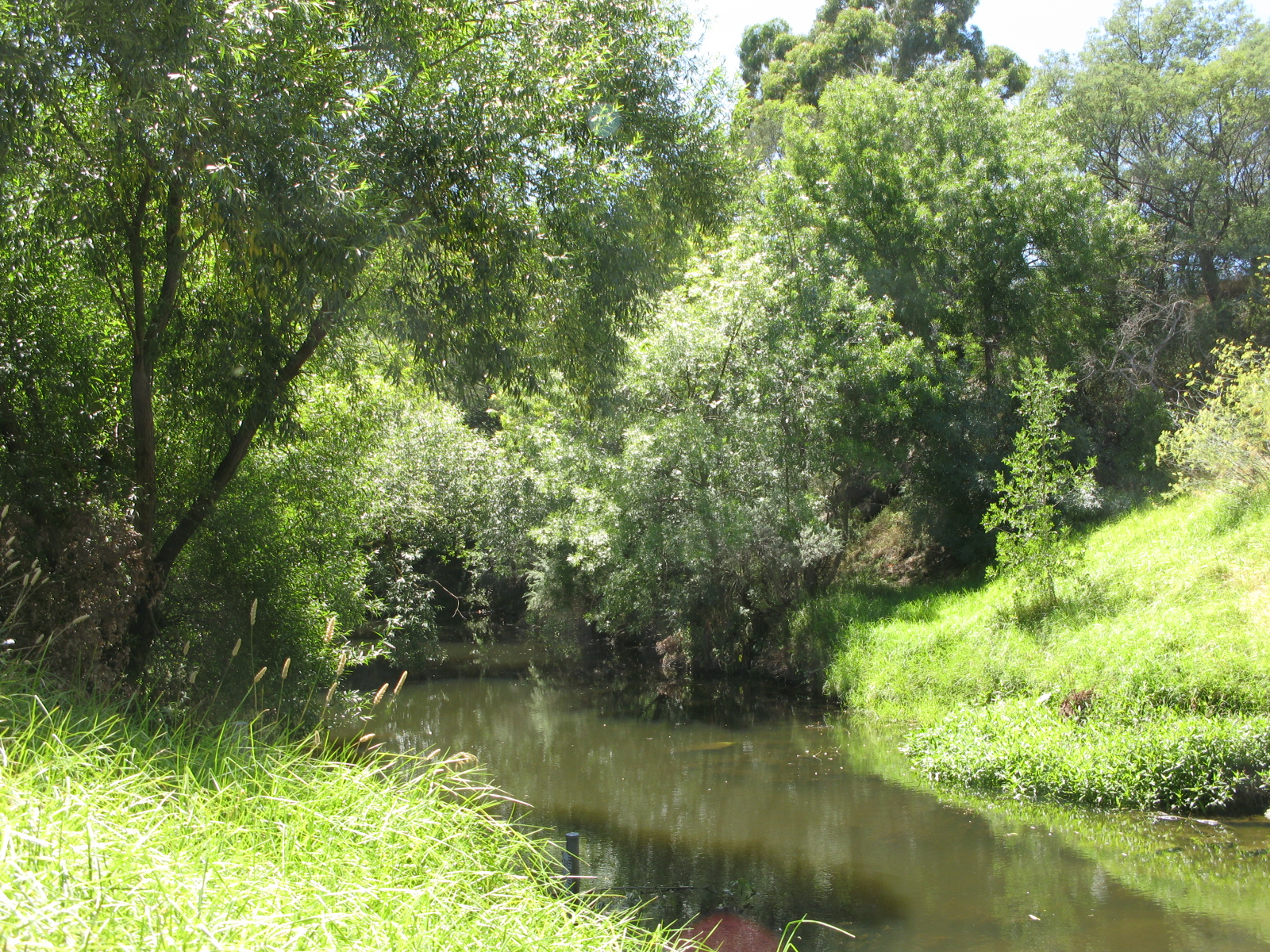
The Merri Creek, through Preston

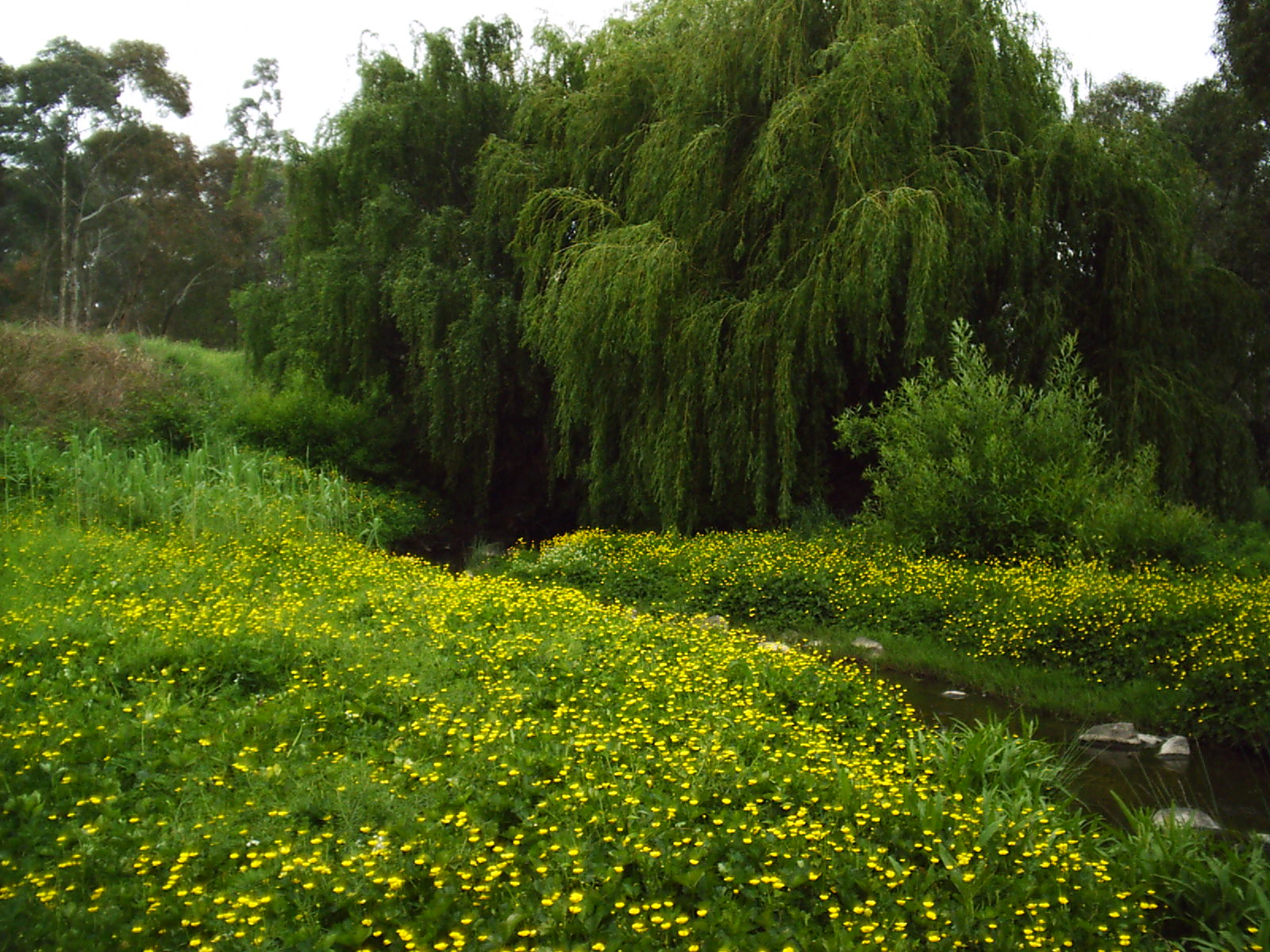
The Merri Creek in Coburg

== Bridges ==
Coordinates	Name	Usage	Description	Photo
37.746466°S 144.980180°E	Cable Suspension Bridge - between Coburg and Preston, also known as Harding st bridge	Pedestrians and cyclists	The only suspension bridge on the Merri creek. Opened in 1985. Replaces similar bridge constructed in 1925 and demolished in 1983.	Taken from west bank of Merri creek looking North East.
37.764750°S 144.984028°E	Warrk-warrk Bridge	Pedestrians and cyclists	Cable-stayed bridge completed in September 2020.	Taken from path, facing East
37.782983°S 144.993197°E	-	-	-	The Merri Footbridge over the Merri Creek in Northcote/Fitzroy North
