= Nilsen (disambiguation) =

Nilsen is a surname.

Nilsen may also refer to:

- Mount Nilsen, Antarctica
- Nilsen Peak, Antarctica
- Nilsen Plateau, Antarctica
- Nilsen Bay, Antarctica
- Nilsen Island, near the island of South Georgia
- Nilsen Township, Wilkin County, Minnesota
