= Hayes Hill (Victoria) =

- Location within Victoria

Highest point
- Elevation: 280 m (920 ft)
- Coordinates: 37°32′21″S 145°00′18″E

Geography
- Location: Victoria, Australia

Hayes Hill is a small scoria cone in Donnybrook, approximately 30 km north of Melbourne, Victoria, Australia. It is on the eastern edge of the Newer Volcanics Province.

Hayes Hill is considered a regionally significant geological site as a source of the lava flows that follow the ancestral Merri and Darebin Creeks and Yarra River through the northern suburbs of Melbourne into the CBD.
