= Clyde Stanway =

Australian rules footballer

Personal information
- Full name: George Clyde Stanway
- Born: 23 June 1886; Fitzroy, Victoria
- Died: 6 June 1968 (aged 81); Coburg North, Victoria
- Original team: Brunswick

Playing career^{1}
Years	Club	Games (Goals)
1906	Melbourne	13 (1)
- ^{1} Playing statistics correct to the end of 1906.

George Clyde Stanway (23 June 1886 – 6 June 1968) was an Australian rules footballer who played with Melbourne in the Victorian Football League (VFL).
