= Wheeler Glacier =

Glacier in Antarctica

- Location within Antarctica Location within South Georgia Island
- Interactive map of Wheeler Glacier
- Location: South Georgia
- Coordinates: 54°36′S 36°22′W
- Length: 2 nmi (4 km; 2 mi)
- Thickness: unknown
- Terminus: Royal Bay
- Status: unknown

Wheeler Glacier (54°36′S 36°22′W) is a glacier draining the north flank of Mount Fraser, flowing west-northwest for 2 miles (3.2 km) to the south coast of South Georgia. Surveyed by the SGS in the period 1951–57. Named by the United Kingdom Antarctic Place-Names Committee (UK-APC) for J.F.G. Wheeler, British zoologist and member of the scientific staff of the Discovery Investigations Marine Station, Grytviken, South Georgia, 1925–27 and 1929–30.

== See also ==
- List of glaciers in the Antarctic
- Glaciology
