= Mount Frazier =

Mount Frazier may refer to:

- Mount Frazier (Antarctica), a mountain in Marie Byrd Land, Antarctica
- Mount Frazier (Montana), a mountain in Montana, United States

== See also ==
- Mount Fraser (disambiguation)
