= Coburg Harriers =

Athletics club in Melbourne, Australia

Coburg Harriers Athletic Club
- Sport: Athletics
- Founded: 30 March 1896; 130 years ago
- Stadium: Harold Stevens Athletics Track, Coburg North, Victoria, Australia
- Affiliation: Athletics Victoria
- Website: www.coburgharriers.org.au

Coburg Harriers is an athletics club in Coburg in the inner northern suburbs of Melbourne, Australia. The club is based at the Harold Stevens Athletics Track.

== History ==
The club was founded in 1896. The first general meeting of the club was held at the Public Hall in Coburg on Monday, 30 March 1896. The club affiliated with the Victorian Amateur Athletics Association (VAAA) on 13 May 1896. The first official uniform was all white, with royal blue facings and a royal blue capital C on the front. The club was located in a shed at the rear of the Corner Hotel, on the corner of Bell Street and Sydney Road, Coburg.

The first competitive event that Coburg Harriers participated in was on 20 September 1896 in the Victorian 10 mile Cross Country Championship where the Club finished 11th. The first representative at a National Championships was by T. Lobse who competed in the 100 yards handicap race held at the Sydney Cricket Ground in October 1897. Lobse won the third heat running off 9 yards in a time of 10.2 seconds. He eventually finished 4th in the first semi final.

== Venues ==
In 1955, with the assistance of Coburg City Council, Harriers procured a cinder track at McDonald reserve in Coburg, one of only a few in Victoria at the time, costing £150. It was a major upgrade for the club at the time.

== Affiliation ==
As of 2013 it was affiliated with Athletics Victoria (AV).

== Coburg Harriers in International competition ==
=== Olympic Games ===
- W. "Victor" Aitken in London 1908
- Robert Prentice in Helsinki 1952
- Joan Morrison in Helsinki in 1952
- Ray Smith in Melbourne in 1956
- Neville Sayers in Melbourne in 1956
- Robert Grant in Melbourne in 1956
- Herb Elliott in Rome in 1960
- Raelene Boyle in Mexico City in 1968 and Munich in 1972 and Montreal in 1976 (also selected for Moscow in 1980 but did not compete)
- Jean Roberts in Mexico City in 1968

=== Paralympic Games ===
- Jodie Willis in 1992, 1996, 2000 and 2004
- Lachlan Jones in 1996, 2000 and 2004

=== Empire/Commonwealth Games ===
- Robert Prentice in 1950
- John Marks in 1950
- Ross Price in 1950
- William De Gruchy in 1950
- Herb Elliot in 1958
- Keith Wheeler in 1962 and 1966
- Carolyn Lewis in 1962
- Jean Roberts in 1962, 1966, 1970 and 1974
- Noel Clough in 1966
- Raelene Boyle in 1970, 1974, 1978 and 1982
- John Fleming in 1982

Neville Sillitoe was elected Head Athletics coach at the 1982 Commonwealth Games.

== Other events ==
Coburg Harriers also host a 24-hour event in April each year, a 6 hour event in March each year and regular fun runs around the Coburg area. The 24-hour event is sanctioned by the Australian Ultra Runners Association (AURA) and in 2013 and 2014 will double as the Australian 24-hour track championships. The first 24-hour event was held on 16 and 17 October 1954; it was the first such event ever held in Melbourne.
