= Novosilski Bay =

Bay in South Georgia and the South Sandwich Islands

Coordinates: 54°39′S 36°21′W

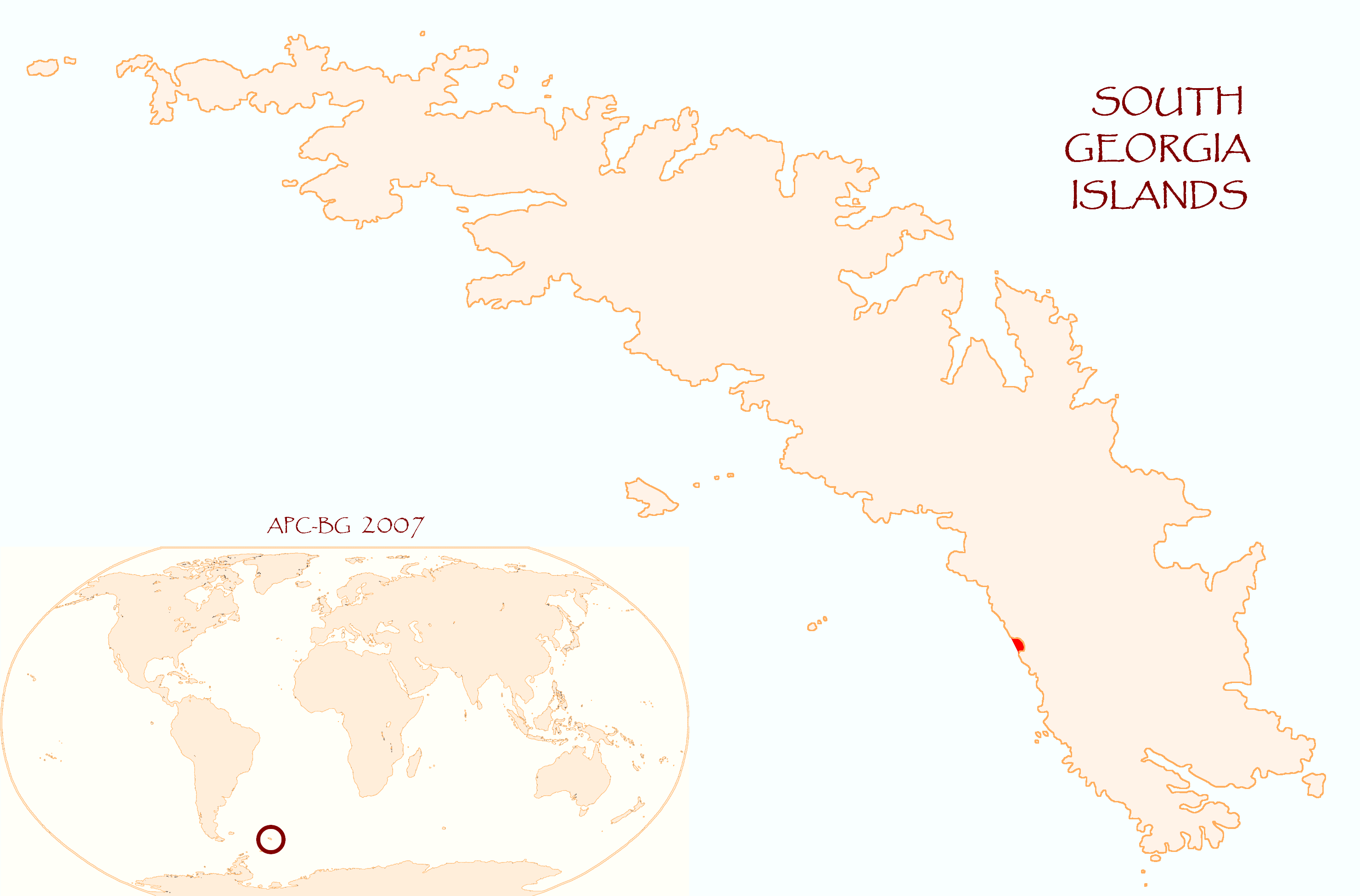
Location of Novosilski Bay on South Georgia Island

Novosilski Bay extends its indention into the southern coastline of South Georgia, lying just south of Mount Fraser. It spans a width of 2 miles (3.2 km). This bay was first encountered by a Russian expedition led by Bellingshausen in 1819. It was named in honor of Lieutenant Pavel M. Novosilskiy, a member of the Mirny vessel that sailed alongside Bellingshausen's flagship, the Vostok, during the inaugural Russian Antarctic Expedition from 1819 to 1821.

Despite variations in spelling, the term "Novosilski" has solidified as the accepted form over an extended period of usage.

== See also ==
- Nilsen Island
