= Edwardes Lake =

Artificial lake in Melbourne

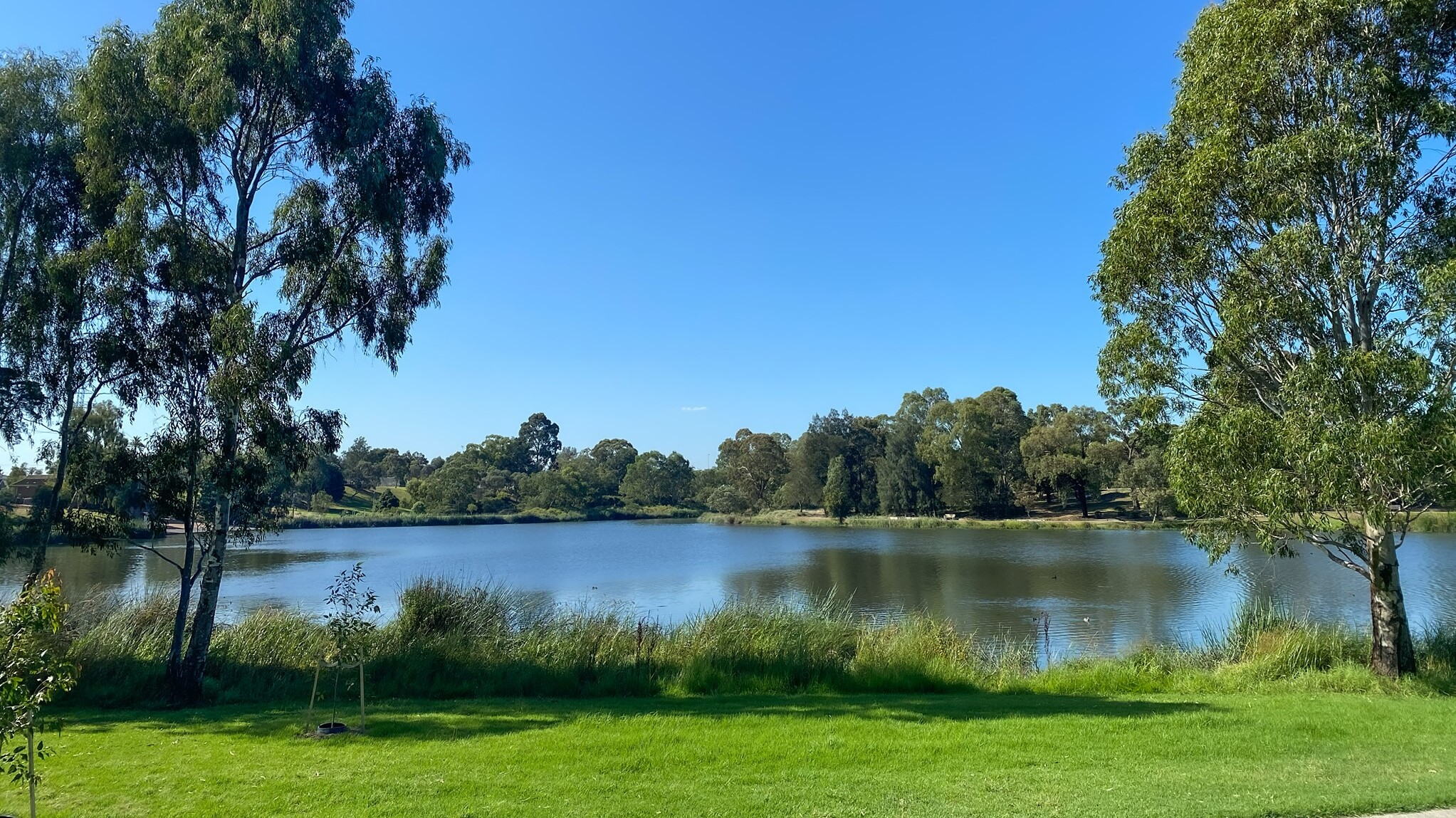

- Location within Victoria
- Location: City of Darebin, Victoria
- Coordinates: 37°42′52″S 144°59′29″E
- Type: artificial lake
- Primary inflows: Edgars Creek
- Basin countries: Australia
- Built: 1888
- Average depth: 1 m (3.3 ft)
- Website: www.darebin.vic.gov.au/Events-and-facilities/Parks-and-playgrounds-directory/Edwardes-Lake-Park

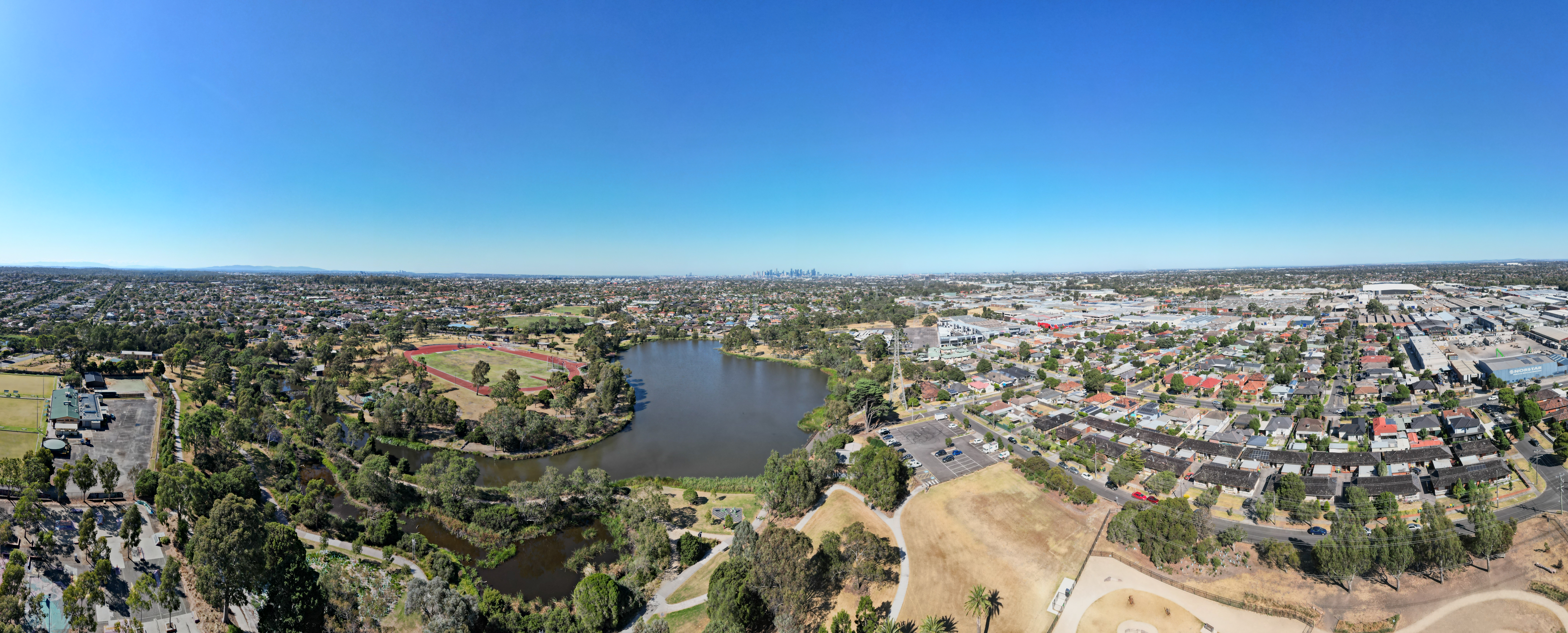
Edwardes Lake panorama facing the Melbourne skyline. March 2024.

Edwardes Lake is a recreational waterbody in the Melbourne suburb of Reservoir, Victoria, Australia.

== History ==
The lake was formed by the damming of Edgars Creek at Edwardes Street, and is surrounded by Edwardes Lake Park.

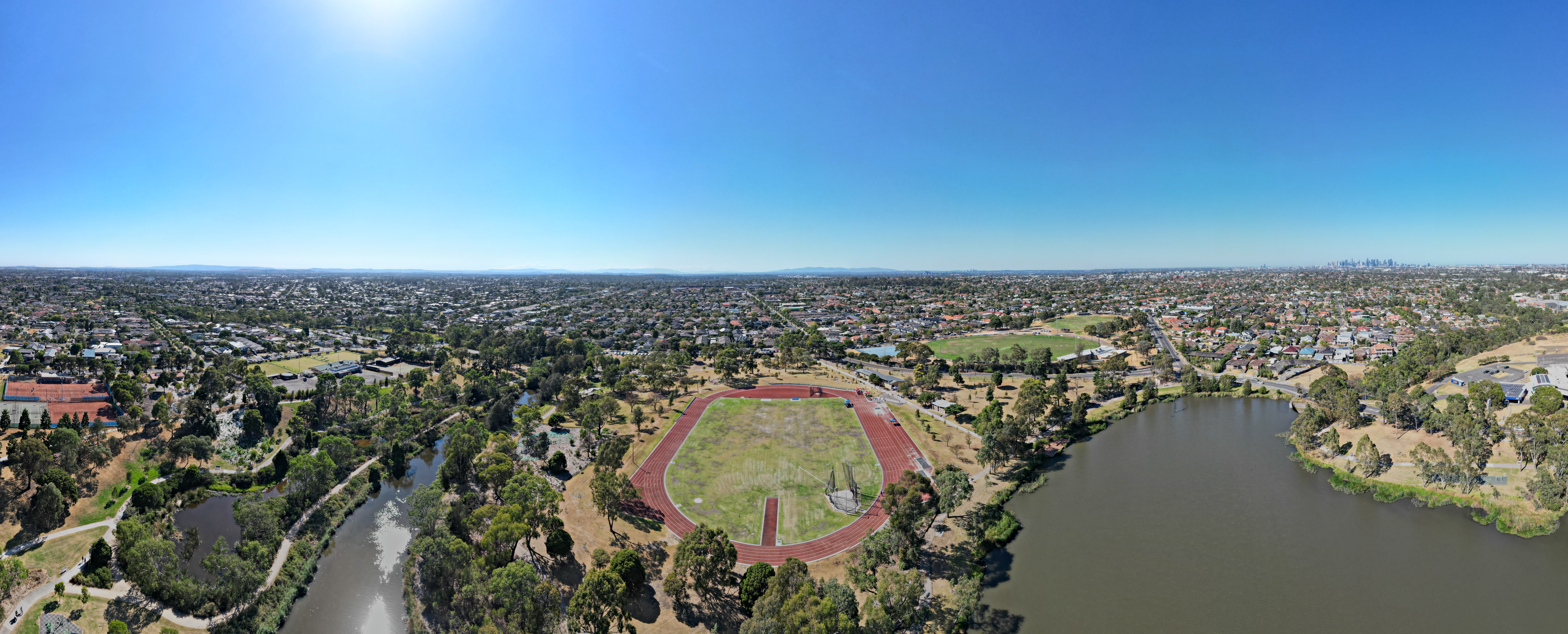
Edwardes Lake in Reservoir with the Preston Athletic Club in the middle of the frame. March 2024.

Edwardes Lake was formed as a private enterprise in 1888, by the construction of an embankment across the creek. Associated facilities included boat sheds and refreshment rooms, and sporting events were held on the lake. A tramway was proposed to connect the suburbs of Heidelberg and Coburg, running past the lake, but the collapse of the land boom in the early 1890s ended that project. The embankment was later partly washed away in floods.

In 1914, Thomas Dyer Edwardes donated 34 acres (14 ha) of land to the City of Preston for the creation of a park. The Preston Council purchased another 12 acres (5 ha) to add to the park. Carlo Catani, the Chief Engineer of the Public Works Department, was approached to provide a plan for laying out the park. The Reservoir Progress Association fenced the parkland and planted over 700 trees. The official opening was on Saturday, July 29 1916, presided over by the local member of parliament, J. G. Membrey M.L.A., the Mayor, Councillor C. Stanlake, Mr Henty, on behalf of Mr Edwardes, and J.S. McFadzean, representing the Reservoir Progress Association. Mrs Membrey, Mrs Stanlake, Mrs McFadzean and Mrs Rae each planted a tree on the day.

The planting of a memorial avenue was proposed, but was never carried out. However, a new concrete weir and spillway was funded in 1919 by a Repatriation grant, presumably with returned servicemen providing the labour, and an Armistice memorial stone was inset into the weir. The new work was officially opened on 3 April 1920 by Brigadier-General Brand. The improvements meant that swimming could be officially permitted, and the Preston Lifesaving Club was formed to demonstrate swimming and lifesaving techniques, lasting from 1919 to 1939. Swimming in the lake was banned in 1939 due to heavy pollution, although people continued to do so and there were a number of drownings. The Preston Rowing Club, based at Edwardes Lake, was founded in 1919.
