= Beveridge, Victoria =

Beveridge
- Town
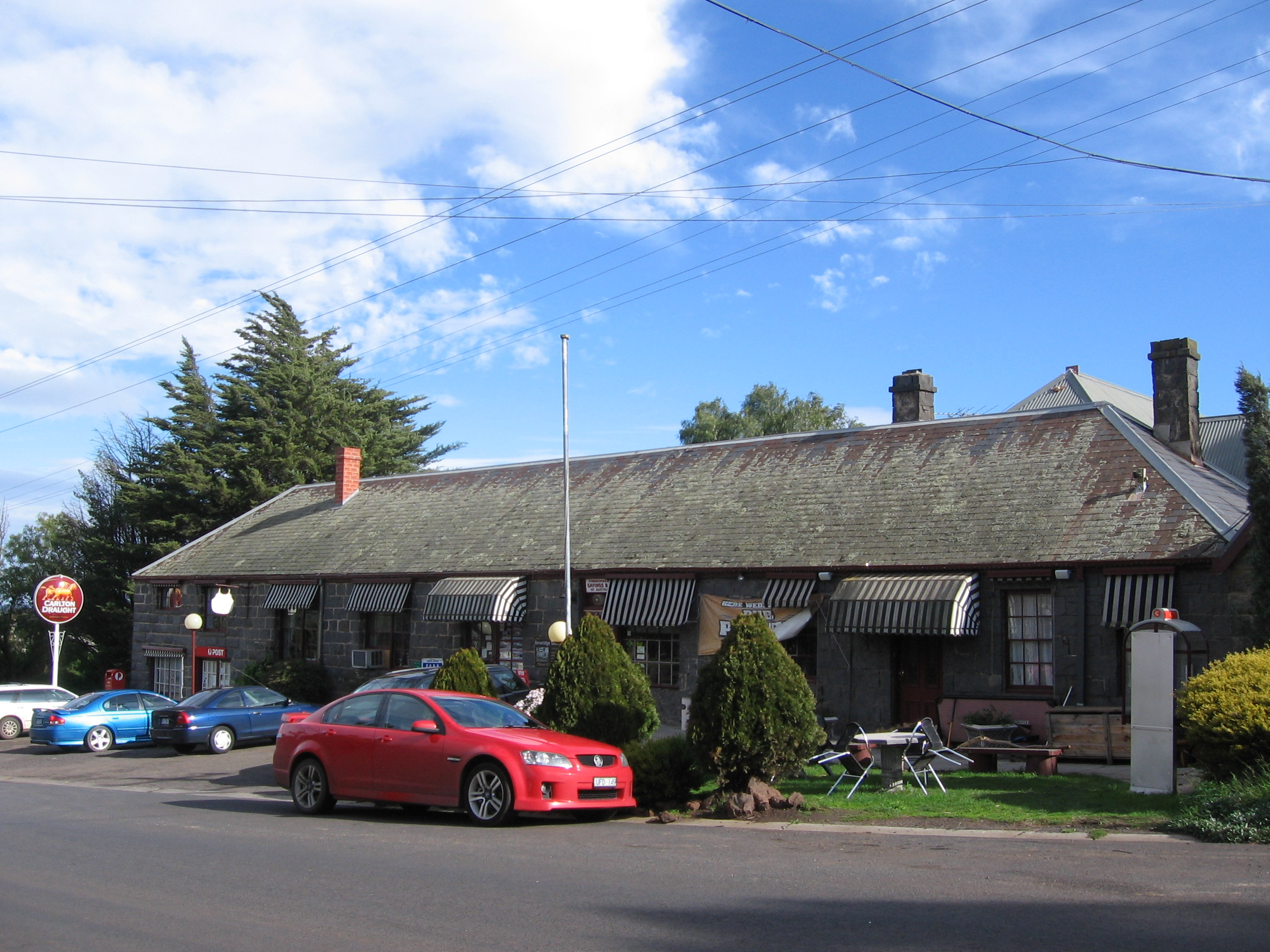
- Hunters Tryste Inn, 1845

- Interactive map of Beveridge
- Coordinates: 37°29′S 144°59′E
- Country: Australia
- State: Victoria
- Region: Hume
- LGAs: Shire of Mitchell; City of Whittlesea
- Location: 37 km (23 mi) N of Melbourne; 20 km (12 mi) S of Kilmore; 7 km (4.3 mi) S of Wallan

Government
  - State electorate: Kalkallo
  - Federal division: McEwen

Population
  - Total: 4,642 (2021 census)
- Postcode: 3753
Localities around Beveridge
Darraweit Guim	Wallan	Upper Plenty
Clarkefield; Darraweit Guim	Beveridge	Eden Park
Mickleham	Donnybrook; Kalkallo; Mickleham	Woodstock

Beveridge is a town in Victoria, Australia, 37 km (23 mi) north of Melbourne's Central Business District, located within the City of Whittlesea and the Shire of Mitchell local government areas. Beveridge recorded a population of 4,642 at the 2021 census.

== History ==
Beveridge was named after Scottish sheep farmer Andrew Beveridge, who built the Hunters' Tryst Inn in 1845. The Inn still serves as a hotel, as well as post office and general store.

Beveridge Post Office opened on 1 January 1865.

Near Beveridge is Mount Fraser, an eroded extinct volcanic cone. It is a large scoria volcano with two craters, which last erupted about one million years ago. The north side of the hill is quite steep and reaches a height of 125 metres above the surrounding basalt plain. From this location, the explorers Hume and Hovell first saw Port Phillip on 14 December 1824. A quarry now operates at the side of the hill and supplies most of Melbourne's scoria. A copy of the original Eureka flag flies atop this hill every year to commemorate Ned Kelly.

== Ned Kelly ==
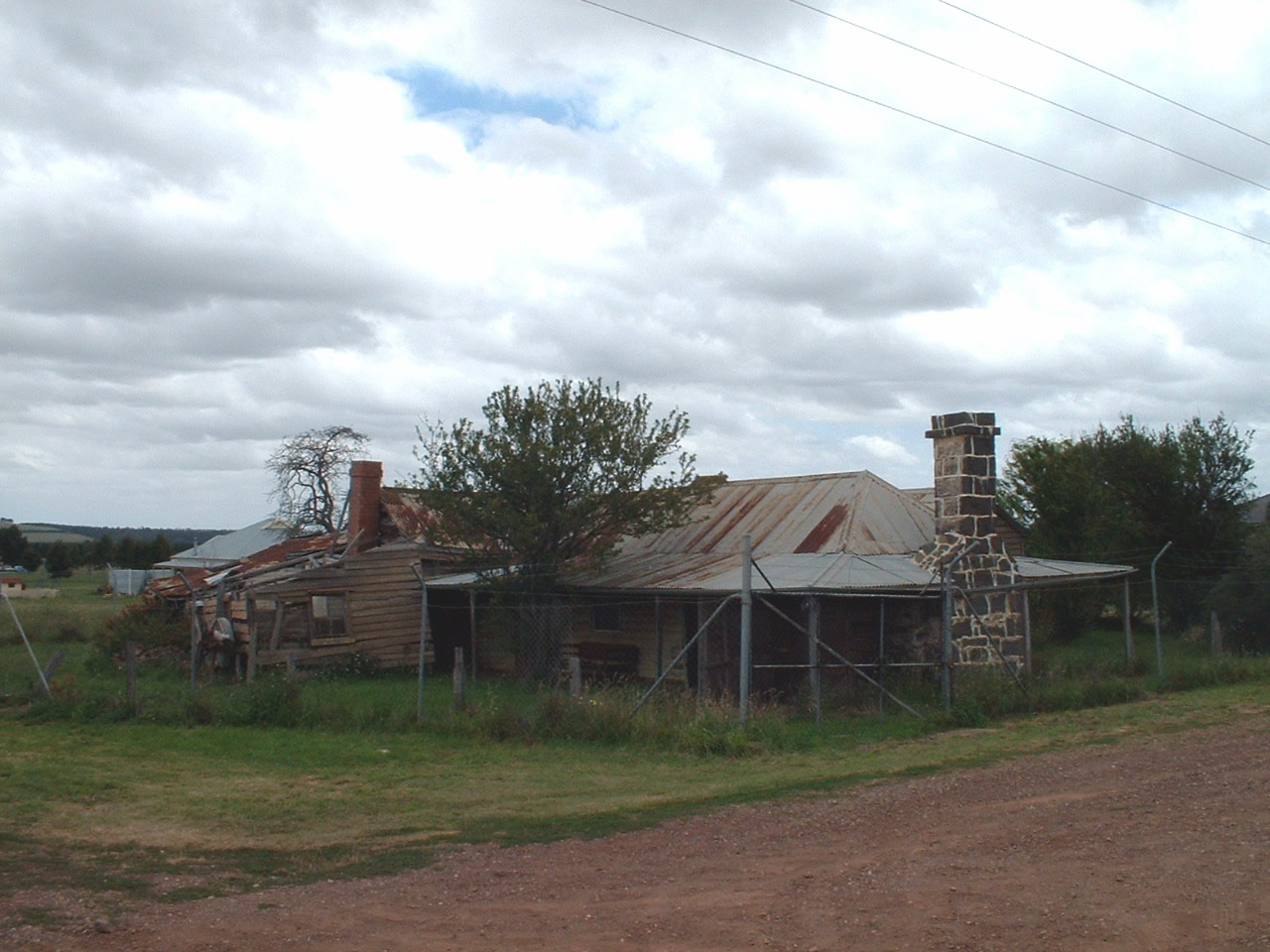
John Kelly's house, Beveridge

The town is principally known as the birthplace of bushranger, Ned Kelly, and his home for the first nine years of his life. Ned's birth was not officially recorded. Ned was born in December 1854 at Beveridge, on the 17-hectare (41-acre) Kelly farm near Big Hill (now known as Mount Fraser). John 'Red' Kelly sold his farm for £80, and headed further north up the Old Sydney Road to Avenel in 1863, where they rented 16 ha (40 acres) the banks of the Hughes Creek.

It is said that on the train heading south to Melbourne after his capture at Glenrowan in 1880, as he approached Beveridge station, he pointed to the left and said, "See that little hill over there, that's where I drew my first breath" (The Age, June 1880). Denheld argues that historians have mistakenly taken Kelly's words to have been spoken one month later on a train heading north to Beechworth for his preliminary trial, and have therefore looked to the other side of the railway line for the hill, concluding that this hill is Big Hill (now known as Mount Fraser).

At Beveridge, a cottage where the Kelly family lived for a short time is still standing today, located on Kelly Street. It is recorded that John Kelly built this house in 1859, when Ned was about five years old. His brother Dan was born in the house. The house was added to the Victorian Register of Historic Buildings in September 1992. Its design is unusual in Victoria, and shows the Irish heritage of its builder. The Primary School is a bluestone building where the Kelly family once went to church and Ned went to school. Located on a hillside, this Gothic-style building was built between 1857 and 1862 as both a Catholic church and a school. The sacristy and chancel were added in 1877.

== Transport ==
=== Bus ===
One bus route serves Beveridge:

- 511 : Craigieburn station – Mandalay via Olivine, operated by CDC Melbourne

=== Train ===
There are no railway stations in Beveridge, with Donnybrook and Wallan the nearest stations to Beveridge. Both are on the regional North East line.

Beveridge had a railway station, which opened on 14 October 1872. It closed on 2 April 1990, and was demolished by February 1991.

== See also ==
- Shire of Kilmore – Beveridge was previously within this former local government area.
