= Edgars Creek =

Coordinates: 37.675594°S 145.00709°E

Location
- Country: Australia
- State: Victoria

Physical characteristics
- Length: 17 km (11 mi)
- Basin size: Unknown

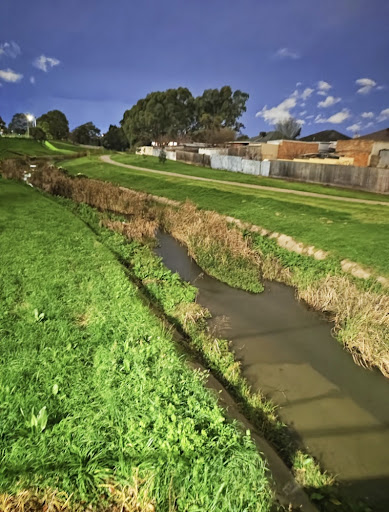
Edgars Creek near Thomastown Library

Edgar's Creek is a minor creek tributary of the Merri Creek in the northern suburbs of Melbourne, Australia.

Edgars Creek has a catchment on the basalt plains in Wollert and flows south through the suburbs of Epping, Thomastown and Reservoir, to join the Merri Creek at Coburg North.

Sites of geomorphological significance located along the creek include a silurian bed waterfall, a high cliff which exposes the Melbourne Formation sediments, and Pleistocene alluvial terraces and meanders where bones of extinct marsupials such as Diprotodon have been found. These flats have been shown to contain Aboriginal archaeological material and were used for Market Gardens and associated with the McKay farm in the nineteenth century.

The origin of the name is unclear, but was first used in 1853, and possible candidates are Francis Edgar, the second teacher at the Merri Creek Aboriginal School or Edward Edgar, who was a prominent auctioneer in Port Phillip in the 1840s and 50s.

Much of the waterway has been altered by forming into an artificial channel, concrete lining and construction of a dam at Edwardes Lake. However, there are plans to rehabilitate the creek to a more natural appearance.
