= Charles Troedel =

Australian printer

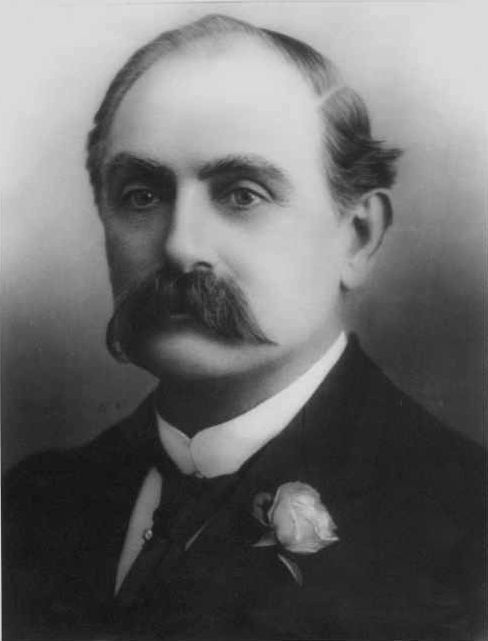

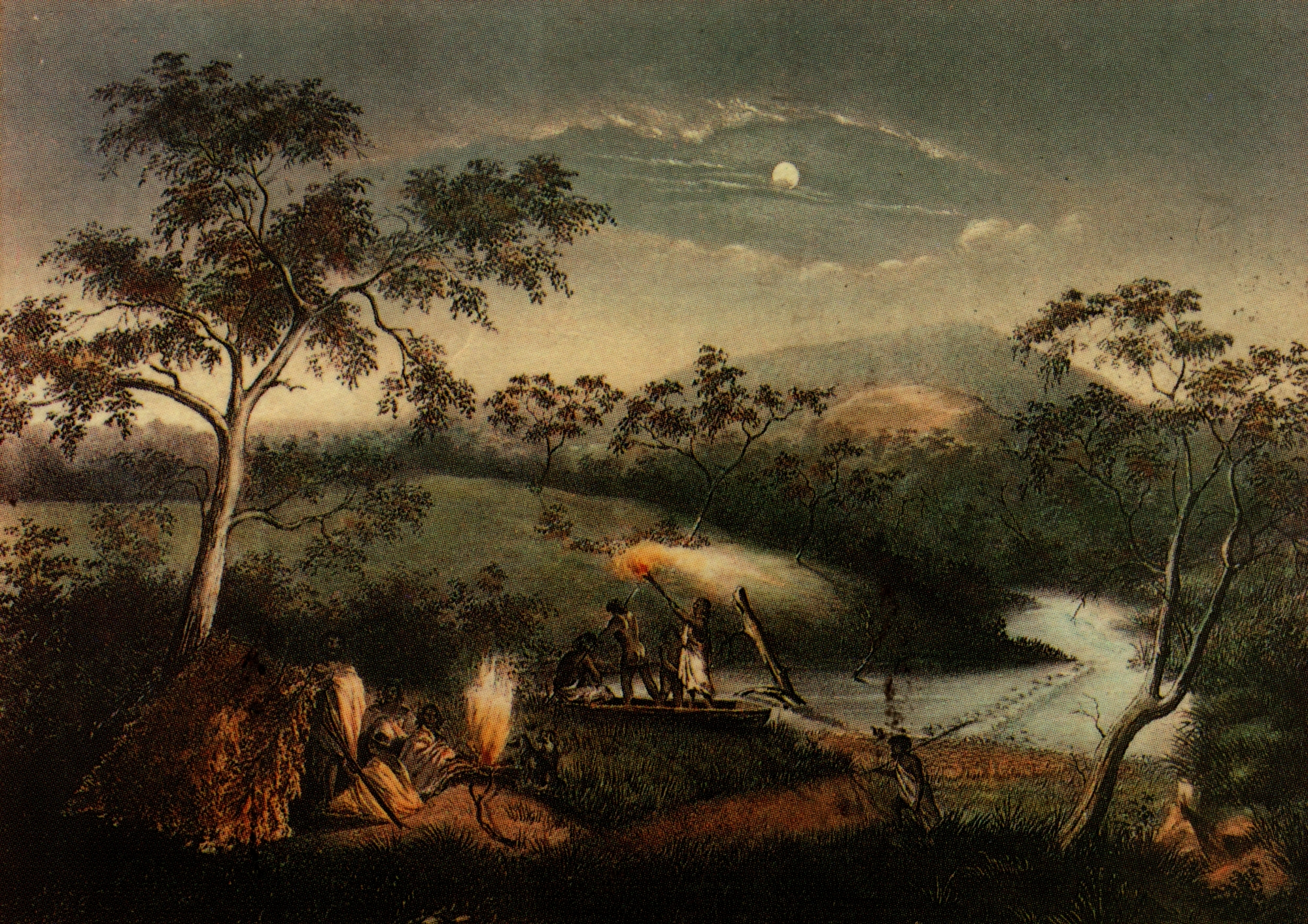
Aborigines on Merri Creek by Charles Troedel, published 1865

Charles Troedel (born Johannes Thedor Carl Troedel, 1835 or 1836; died 1906) was a German-born lithographic printer prominent in Melbourne during the late 19th century. He was apprenticed to his father at the age 13 and at the age of 24, emigrated to Melbourne, arriving in Williamstown on board the Great Britain in 1860.

Trading as Troedel & Co, and from 1910 Troedel & Cooper, his company had close links with many well-known artists of that era. One of his apprentices was Arthur Streeton who was still working for him before being discovered by Tom Roberts and Frederick McCubbin. His name was well known in the printing industry for over 100 years.

In 1863, French born lithographer François Cogné convinced Troedel that a book of Melbourne views would be a financial success. This artwork was ultimately published as 12 monthly subscriptions of 2 views per month and known as the Melbourne Views. A bound copy of the full 24 views is held in the National Gallery of Australia, Canberra.

Troedel carried out the lithography for Ferdinand von Mueller's landmark work Eucalyptographia. A descriptive atlas of the eucalypts of Australia and the adjoining islands published between 1879 and 1884.

A handsomely illustrated volume of Troedel's work was published in 2020 (Printed on Stone: The Lithographs of Charles Troedel by Amanda Scardamaglia, Melbourne Books).
