= Beveridge railway station =

Former railway station in Victoria, Australia

Coordinates: 37°28′03″S 144°59′46″E

Beveridge

General information
- Line: North East
- Platforms: 2
- Tracks: 2

Other information
- Status: Closed

History
- Opened: 14 October 1872
- Closed: 2 April 1990

Services
Preceding station	Disused railways	Following station
Donnybrook	North East	Wallan
	List of closed railway stations in Victoria	
Location

Beveridge is a closed railway station on the North East railway that served the township of the same name in Victoria, Australia. The station opened on 14 October 1872. A goods shed was provided on opening, and was moved in 1885 to the down side of the line. The final station building was located on the down platform and was moved from Bright to replace the original in October 1900.

The station platform was extended in 1883, following the duplication of the line from Donnybrook, and a Melbourne-bound (up) platform was provided in the same year. Duplication continued northwards in 1886. The station was closed on 2 April 1990 and the platforms were removed in February 1991. The platform mounds can still be seen as well as the slew in the parallel standard gauge line, which allowed trains to pass behind the former "up platform."

In 2016, it was announced that a station would be re-established at Beveridge to serve a proposed new suburb accommodating up to 3,500 dwellings and more than 10,000 people.
