= Donnybrook railway station =

Railway station in Victoria, Australia

Donnybrook
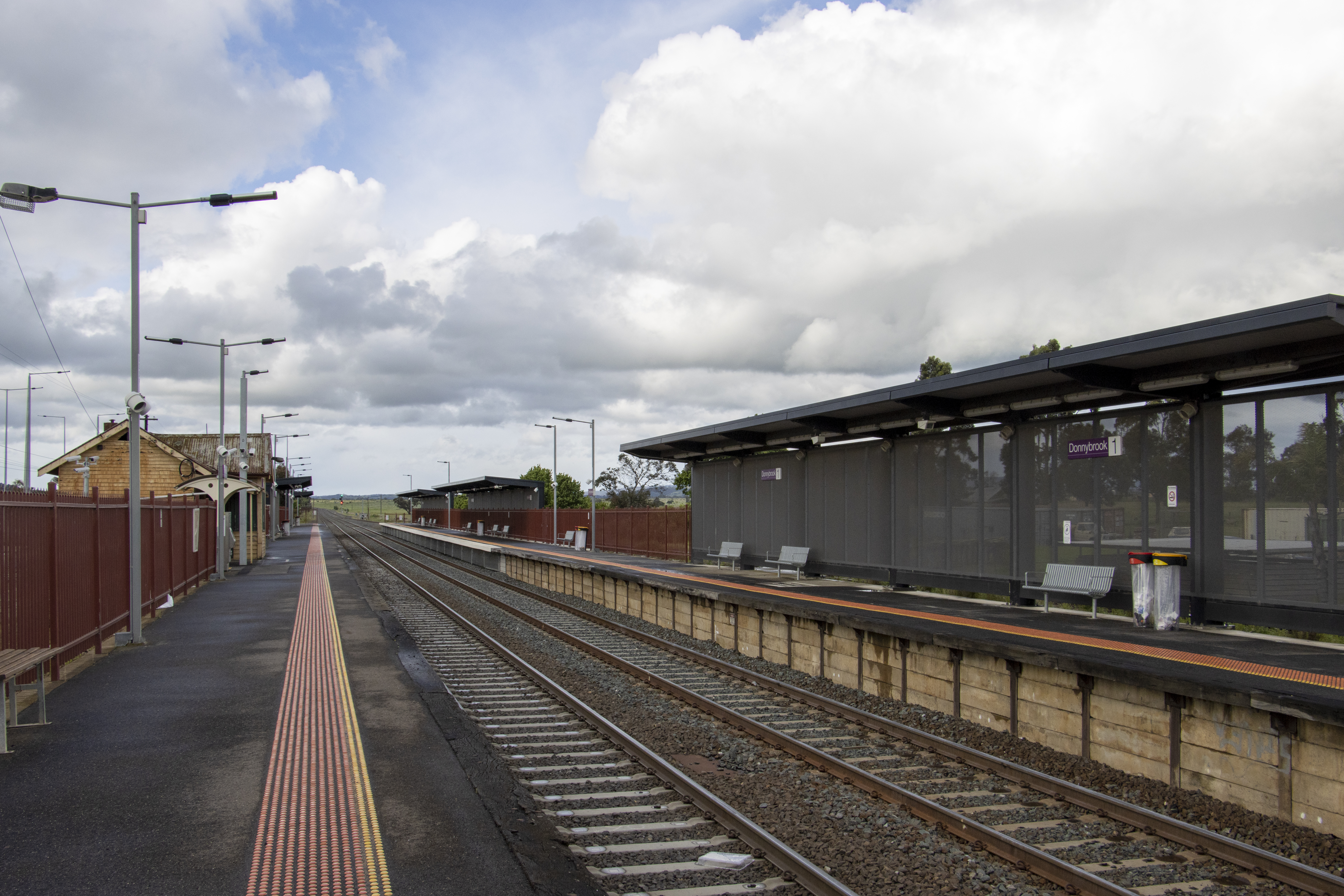
- Northbound view from Platform 2, November 2022

General information
- Location: Donnybrook Road, Donnybrook, Victoria 3064; City of Whittlesea; Australia
- Coordinates: 37°32′31″S 144°58′12″E
- System: PTV regional rail station
- Owner: VicTrack
- Operator: V/Line
- Lines: Seymour Shepparton (Tocumwal)
- Distance: 33.21 kilometres from Southern Cross
- Platforms: 2 side
- Tracks: 3
- Connections: Bus

Construction
- Structure type: Ground
- Parking: Yes
- Cycle facilities: Yes
- Accessible: Yes

Other information
- Status: Operational, unstaffed
- Station code: DNK
- Fare zone: Myki zone 2
- Website: Public Transport Victoria

History
- Opened: 14 October 1872; 154 years ago
- Rebuilt: 23 April 2020

Services
Preceding station	V/Line	Following station
Craigieburn towards Southern Cross	Seymour line	Wallan towards Seymour
Broadmeadows towards Southern Cross	Shepparton line	Wallan towards Shepparton
Craigieburn One-way operation	Shepparton line 1 weekday early morning service	Wallan towards Shepparton
Location
- Location within Melbourne

Donnybrook railway station is a regional railway station operated by V/Line on the Tocumwal, Shepparton and Seymour lines, part of the Victoria rail network. It serves the northern suburb of Donnybrook, in Melbourne, Victoria, Australia. Donnybrook is a ground level unstaffed station, featuring two side platforms. It opened on 14 October 1872, with the current station upgrades provided in April 2020 by the Regional Rail Revival Project.

== History ==
Donnybrook station opened with a single platform on the west side of the line. The railway had opened a few months earlier, as far as School House Lane.

In 1882, a second platform was provided, but duplication of the track in both directions did not occur for a few more years. A goods shed was erected in 1888, while the current station building on Platform 2 dates to 1900. The last siding was abolished in 1989.

In 1961, flashing light signals replaced hand gates at the Donnybrook Road level crossing, located at the up end of the station. In 1998, boom barriers were provided.

In 1962, the Melbourne-Albury standard gauge line was opened, running behind Platform 1, along with the 800-metre Donnybrook Loop, 300 metres to the north. In 2011, the loop was lengthened to 2 kilometres, as part of the upgrade to the Melbourne–Sydney railway by the Australian Rail Track Corporation. In 2011, the passing loop was further extended to become a 6.8-kilometre passing lane.

In early 1976, the goods platform was abolished.

From 1998, the station became the terminus for some V/Line services from Craigieburn station, because there was a crossover between the two tracks at the down end of the station. That practice ceased after Seymour services were upgraded and the suburban electric services were extended to Craigieburn in 2007.

A closed signal box is located on Platform 2. All signals, the crossover points and the signal control levers inside the signal box were removed in March 2011.

In 2016, Platform 2 was extended at the down end of the station, to accommodate 6-car VLocity trains, allowing northbound passengers to enter and exit the train by any door. However, southbound passengers had to use the first three carriages of a VLocity to board or alight, because of the shorter Platform 1.

On 23 April 2020, upgrades to the station were completed as part of the Regional Rail Revival project. They included 150 new car parking spaces, better pedestrian and bus access, upgraded CCTV and the extension of Platform 1 at the down end.

On 10 May 2026, the Victorian Government announced that Donnybrook station would be getting pedestrian safety upgrades and new bicycle parking facilities as part of the 2026/27 $7.6 million State Budget.

The former Beveridge, now demolished, was located between Donnybrook and Wallan stations.

== Platforms and services ==
Donnybrook has two side platforms. It is served by V/Line Seymour and Shepparton line trains, with one Shepparton line service to Shepparton running express through the station during weekends.

Donnybrook platform arrangement
Platform	Line	Destination
1	Seymour line Shepparton line	Southern Cross
2	Seymour line Shepparton line	Seymour, Shepparton

== Transport links ==
CDC Melbourne operates three routes to and from Donnybrook station, under contract to Transport Victoria:

- 501 : to Craigieburn station (express)
- 524 : Kalkallo – Peppercorn Hill Estate (Donnybrook)
- 525 : to Craigieburn station

== Gallery ==
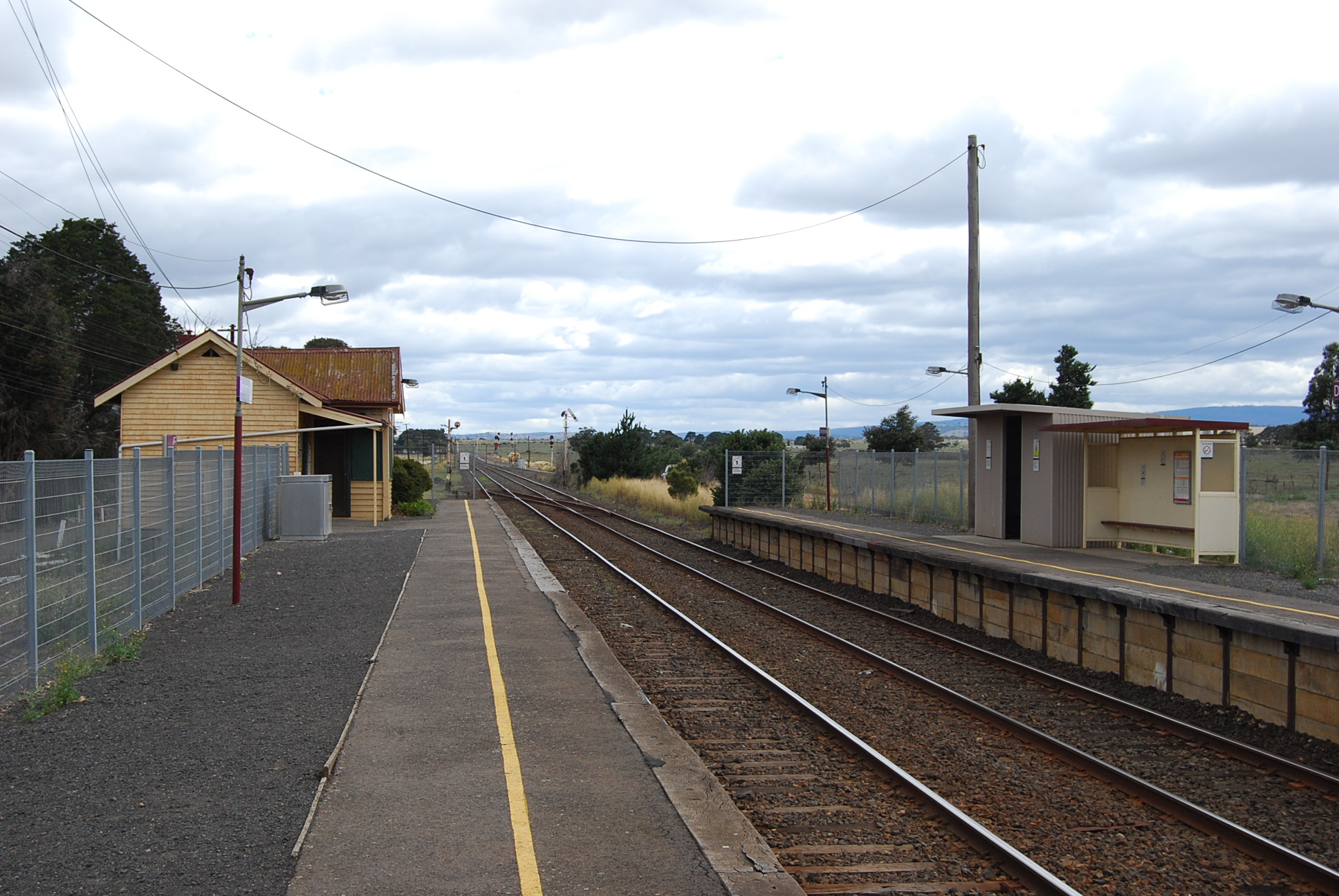
Northbound view from Platform 2, January 2010, ten years prior to it being rebuilt
