= Nilsen Bay =

Bay in Antarctica

Nilsen Bay (67°36′S 64°34′E) is a small bay just west of Strahan Glacier, and 18 nautical miles (33 km) east-southeast of Cape Daly. Discovered in February 1931 by the British Australian New Zealand Antarctic Research Expedition (BANZARE) under Mawson, who named it after the master of the Norwegian whaler Sir James Clark Ross which transported coal to Antarctic waters for the Discovery. On the map published in the Cape Daly and the Strahan Glacier is called Nielsen Bay. Recent examination of Mawson's notes shows that the bay was placed too far west and the name misspelled.
