= Donnybrook, Victoria =

Donnybrook
- Suburb
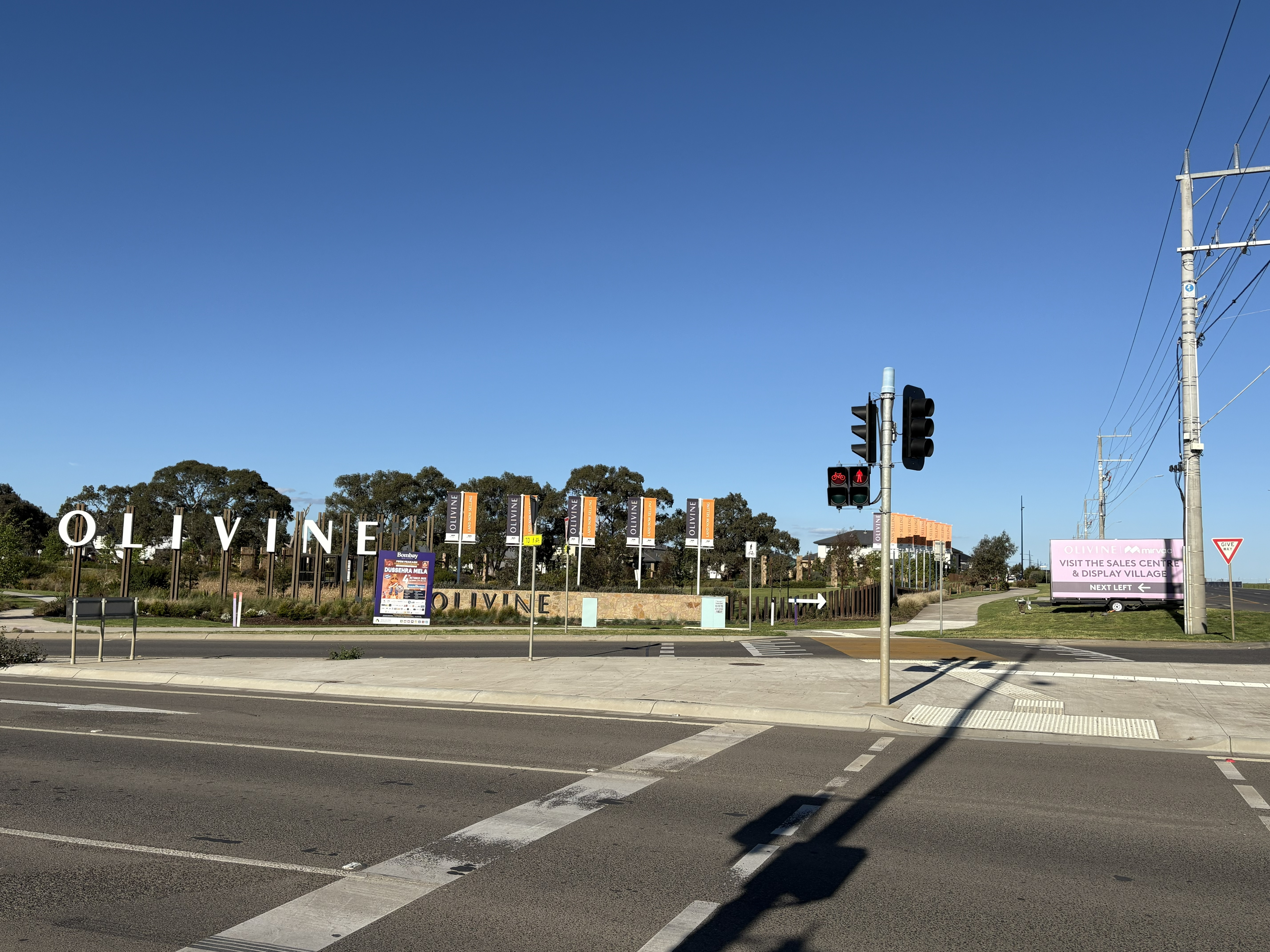
- Entrance to the Olivine Estate Sales Centre and Display Village in Donnybrook, Victoria, October 2025

- Interactive map of Donnybrook
- Coordinates: 37.543°S 144.976°E
- Country: Australia
- State: Victoria
- City: Melbourne
- LGA: City of Whittlesea
- Location: 30 km (19 mi) N of Melbourne; 7 km (4.3 mi) NE of Craigieburn

Government
  - State electorate: Yan Yean
  - Federal division: McEwen

Population
  - Total: 2,100 (2021 census)
- Postcode: 3064
Suburbs around Donnybrook
| Beveridge | Beveridge | Beveridge |
| Kalkallo | Donnybrook | Woodstock |
| Craigieburn | Wollert |

Donnybrook is a suburb in Victoria, Australia, 30 km (19 mi) north of Melbourne's Central Business District, located within the City of Whittlesea local government area. Donnybrook recorded a population of 2,100 at the 2021 census.

Donnybrook is bounded to the west by Merri Creek and to the east by Darebin Creek. Donnybrook has one railway station, which is the Donnybrook railway station. Donnybrook is experiencing rapid population growth, as evidenced by the construction of several new housing estates.

== History ==
The town was likely named after the Donnybrook Parish in Dublin.

Kinlochewe Post Office opened in 1850 along the Hume Highway; it was known as Donnybrook from 1854 until 1874 and was then renamed Kalkallo.

The railway line was open in 1872 and the station and new village were named Donnybrook. Donnybrook Post Office opened in 1889.

== Education ==
There are two schools in Donnybrook:

- Donnybrook Primary School (opened 2023)
- Hume Anglican Grammar (P-Y12, Donnybrook Campus)

== Facilities ==
The City of Whittlesea opened the murnong Community Centre in February 2026. Facilities include a small branch library operated by Yarra Plenty Regional Library. It's mobile library service also maintains a weekly stop on Monday.

== Residential and commercial development ==
The Donnybrook area has had a number of development initiatives approved. These include:

- Donnybrook-Woodstock Precinct Structure Plan: 37,300 to 44,700 residents was approved in 2017.
- English Street Precinct Structure Plan: 2,900 to 3,400 residents was approved in 2016.
- Northern Quarries Area: 5,600 to 6,800 residents was approved in 2017.

Donnybrook has a number of new housing estates under development, including:

- Olivine, developed by Mirvac
- Peppercorn Hill, developed by Dennis Family Corporation
- Katalia, developed by Stockland
- Heartford, developed by Satterley
- Acclaim, developed by YourLand Developments

== Transport ==
=== Bus ===
Three bus routes service Donnybrook:

- 501 : Donnybrook station – Craigieburn station via Hume Freeway. Operated by CDC Melbourne.
- 511 : Donnybrook station – Mandalay (Beveridge) via Olivine estate. Operated by CDC Melbourne.
- 525 : Donnybrook station – Craigieburn station via Mickleham. Operated by Dysons.

=== Train ===
Donnybrook station is located on the North East line and is served by V/Line Seymour and Shepparton services.

== Books on Donnybrook ==
Jones, Michael Nature's Plenty: a history of the City of Whittlesea, Sydney, N.S.W. Allen & Unwin, 1992 ISBN 1863730761
