= Coburg North =

- Suburb
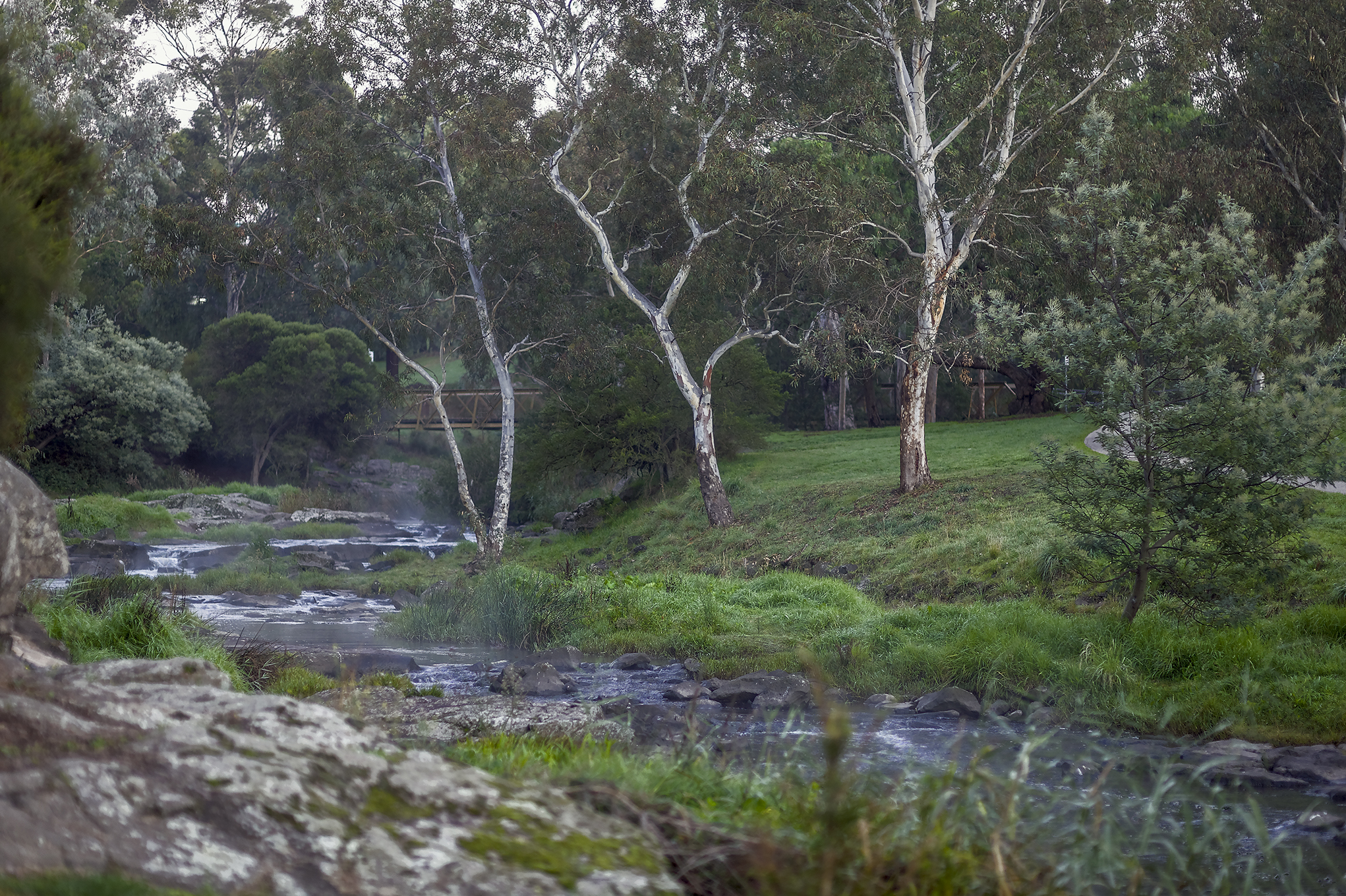
- Merri Creek at Coburg Lake Reserve in April 2021

- Coordinates: 37.726°S 144.96°E
- Country: Australia
- State: Victoria
- City: Melbourne
- LGAs: City of Merri-bek; City of Darebin
- Location: 9 km (5.6 mi) N of Melbourne

Government
  - State electorates: Pascoe Vale; Preston
  - Federal divisions: Cooper; Wills

Area
  - Total: 4.9 km^{2} (1.9 sq mi)

Population
  - Total: 8,327 (2021 census)
  - Density: 1,699/km^{2} (4,400/sq mi)
- Postcode: 3058
Suburbs around Coburg North
| Hadfield; Pascoe Vale | Fawkner; Hadfield | Reservoir |
| Pascoe Vale | Coburg North | Preston; Reservoir |
| Pascoe Vale | Coburg | Preston |

Coburg North is a suburb in Melbourne, Victoria, Australia, 9 km (5.6 mi) north of Melbourne's Central Business District. It is mainly a part of the City of Merri-bek local government area, with a handful of properties on its eastern boundary in the City of Darebin. Coburg North recorded a population of 8,327 at the 2021 census.

The suburb lies north of Coburg, and has the same postcode (3058). The majority of Coburg North is zoned residential, though there are some industrial pockets. The major commercial strip on Sydney Road is primarily automotive-related businesses. Merlynston has a small shopping strip with some cafes. The rest of the suburb is reliant on corner shops for everyday needs.

== History ==
Coburg North Post Office opened on 1 August 1857 and closed in 1980.

=== Heritage listing ===
The following object in Coburg North is listed on the Victorian Heritage Register:

- Moyle pipe organ at St Linus' Anglican Church, 21 Glenydon Avenue

== Housing ==
A large number of the houses in the area have two bedrooms and are made of brick, some with a weatherboard extension. These were constructed in bulk by the Housing Commission of Victoria, and most follow a standard design and layout. The weatherboard extension appears to be standard feature on houses of this period, and can take the form of a third bedroom, extended kitchen or laundry, or a standalone shed. Some houses share a common wall as a duplex unit.

After the closure of the Kodak Factory in 2005, the land began was developed into a A$250 million 21 hectares (52 acres) housing site for 1000 people.

== Local industry ==
Industry in Coburg North is concentrated in the area bounded by Gaffney Street, Sydney Road, Shorts Road and Sussex Street. A notable and major industry in the suburb used to be a factory owned by Kodak, on two sites either side of the Edgars Creek, used for photographic paper manufacture and film processing. With the popularity of digital photography, Kodak has closed the factory.

== Geography ==
Geographical features in North Coburg include:

- The Coburg Olympic Pool
- Edgars Creek
- Merlynston Creek
- Merri Creek
- Village Coburg Drive-In
- Coburg Lake
- Cash Reserve
- Richards Reserve (where the Velodrome is)
- Parker Reserve (Baseball Diamond) with two cricket fields next to it
- Harold Stevens Athletics Track
- Cox Reserve
- Hosken Reserve
- Sanger Reserve

Increased urban consolidation has added to 1-in-100 year flash flooding risk in Coburg North along the course of Merlynston Creek, according to the State Emergency Service (SES). The State Emergency Services says flooding has occurred along the creek path through Coburg North historically in 1891, 1916, 1934, 1954, 1974, 1978, 1981, 1983, 1989, 2003, and 2011.

== Educational facilities ==
Coburg North has one State primary school (Coburg North Primary School), with buildings by Percy Everett, a former chief architect of the Public Works Department of Victoria (PWD). Coburg North Primary (No 4543) was built in 1937 in a restrained Art Deco mode in cream brick and is Heritage listed by Merri-bek City Council.

Other schools in Coburg North are the Australian International Academy, an Islamic school which offers primary and secondary schooling across two campuses, and Mercy College, an all girls Catholic high school.

== Transport ==
=== Bus ===
Five bus routes service Coburg North:

- 526 : Coburg – Reservoir via Elizabeth Street, operated by Ventura Bus Lines
- 530 : Campbellfield Plaza Shopping Centre – Coburg via Fawkner, operated by CDC Melbourne
- 531 : Upfield station – Coburg North via Somerset Estate (Campbellfield), operated by CDC Melbourne
- 534 : Glenroy station – Coburg via Boundary Road and Sydney Road. Operated by Dysons.
- 561 : Macleod – Pascoe Vale station via La Trobe University, operated by Dysons

=== Cycling ===
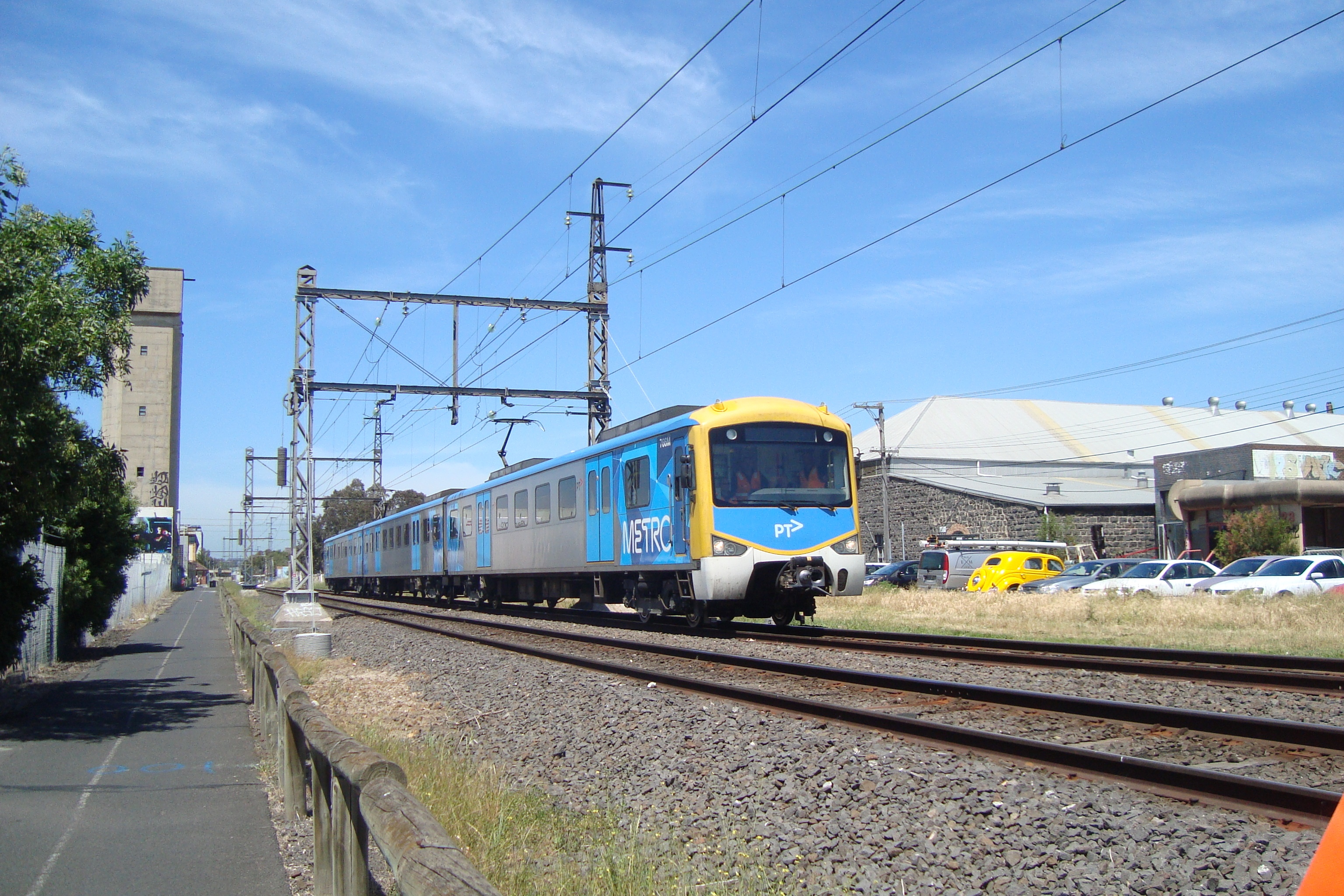
Upfield Bike Path which is located along Brunswick, Coburg and Coburg North along the Upfield railway line, taken near Tinning Street, Brunswick

Cyclists can access the Upfield Bike Path and the Merri Creek Trail, off-road bike paths that traverse Coburg North from north to south. In addition, there are marked bike paths along Boundary Road and Gaffney Street to the west of their intersections with Sydney Road. Merri-bek Council recommends a cycling route between the Upfield and Merri Creek bike paths via Gould Street and Shorts Road, and then on towards Glenroy via Pascoe Vale. This recommended route however has no infrastructure to support it. Elsewhere, there is little provision for cycling or bike routes in the suburb.

=== Train ===
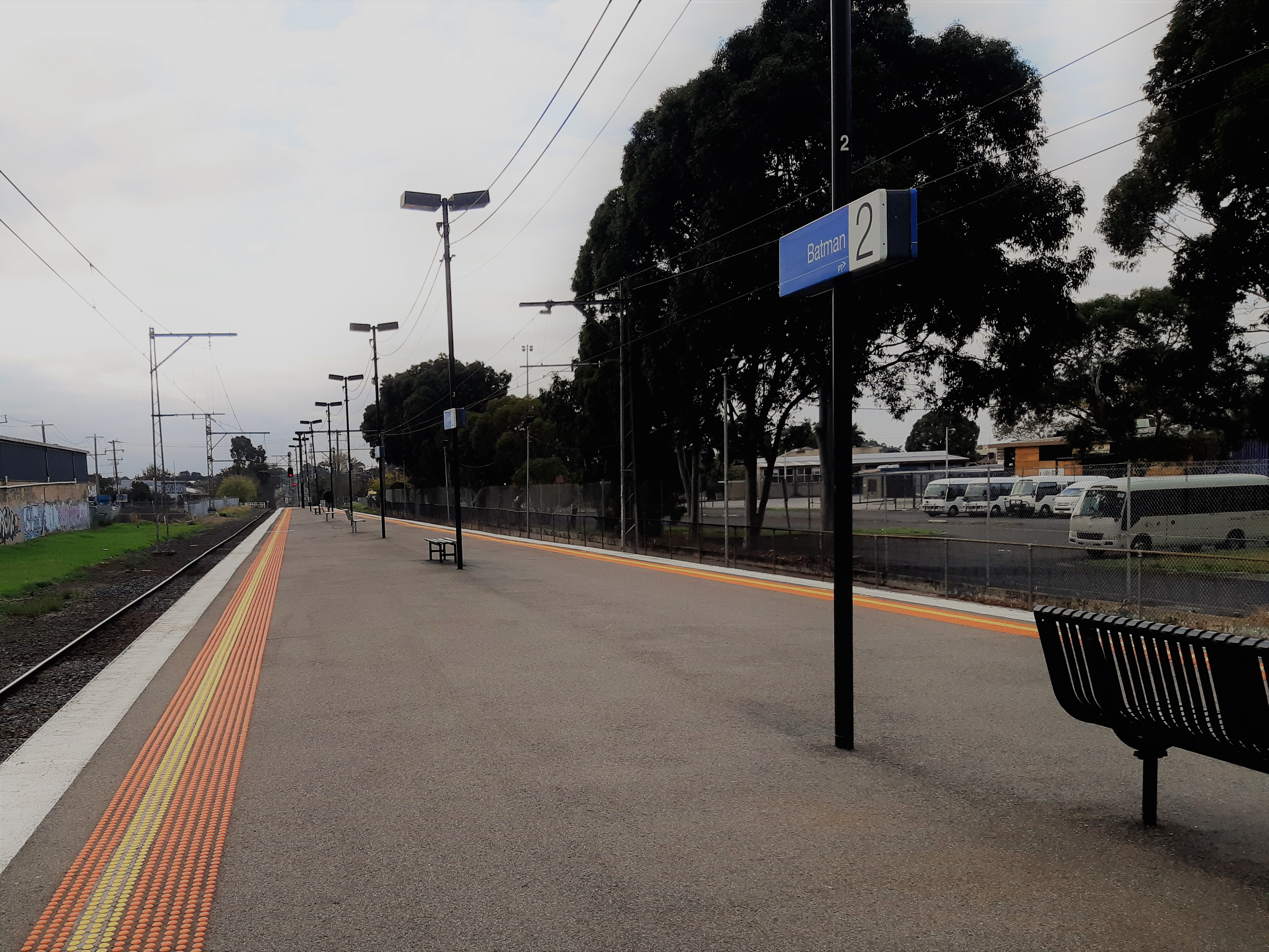
Batman railway station on the Upfield line, viewing northbound from Platform 2, June 2019

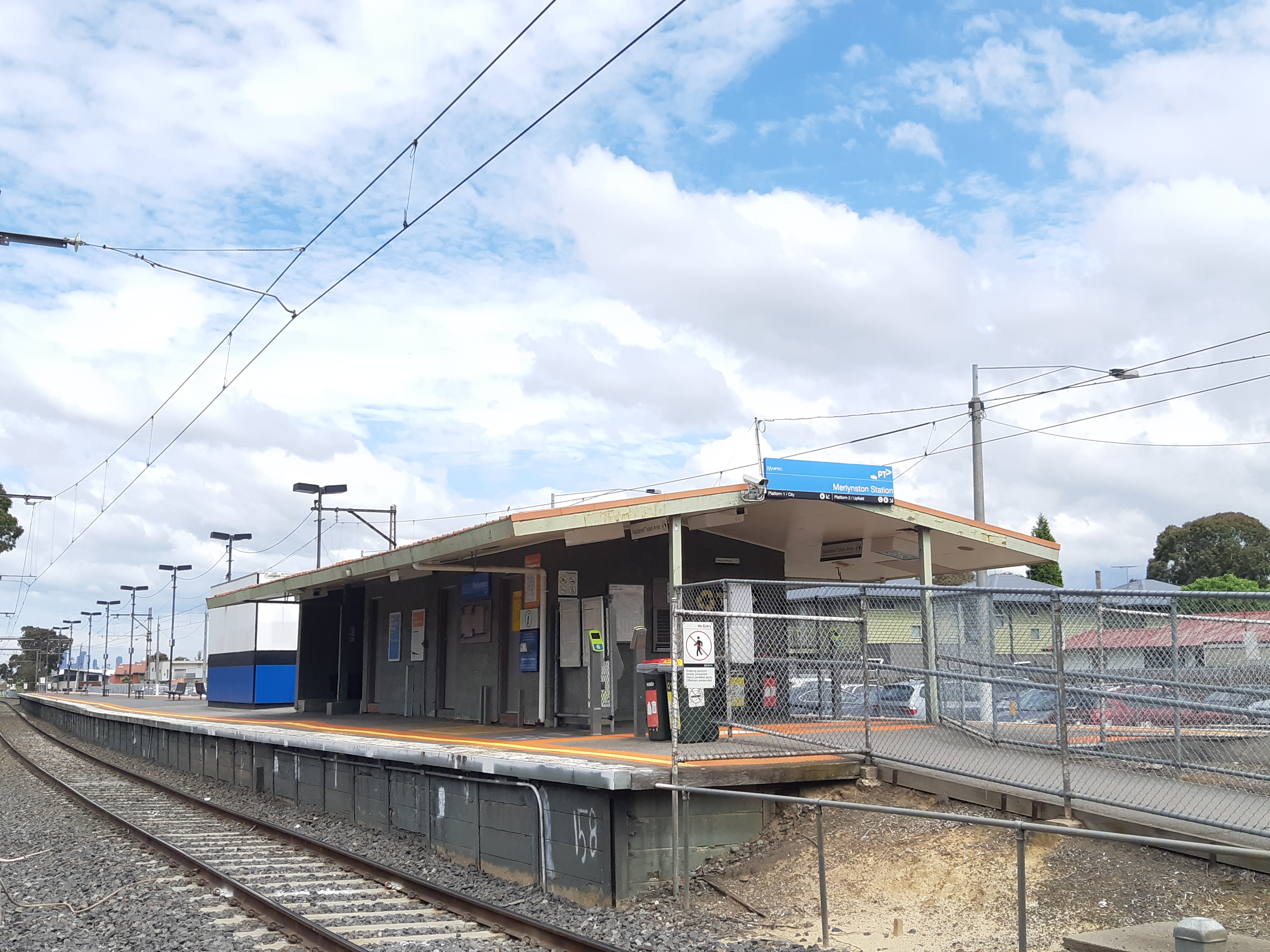
Merlynston railway station on the Upfield line, viewing southbound of Platform 1, October 2019

Two railway stations service Coburg North: Batman and Merlynston, both located on the Upfield railway line.

=== Tram ===
Tram route travels along Sydney Road from the terminus at Bakers Road, Coburg North to Flinders Street station in the city.

== See also ==
- City of Coburg – Coburg North was previously within this former local government area.
