= Nilsen Island =

Nilsen Island (54°39′S 36°25′W) is a small island lying 1.5 nautical miles (2.8 km) west of the north part of Novosilski Bay, off the south coast of South Georgia. The island has appeared on charts since the 1930s. It was recharted by SGS in the period 1951–57, and named by the United Kingdom Antarctic Place-Names Committee (UK-APC) for Nochart Nilsen, gunner of the Compania Argentina de Pesca, Grytviken, 1939–40 and 1946–48, and of the South Georgia Whaling Company, Leith Harbor, for several years beginning in 1949.

== See also ==
- List of Antarctic and sub-Antarctic islands
