= Mount Fraser (South Georgia) =

Mountain in South Georgia

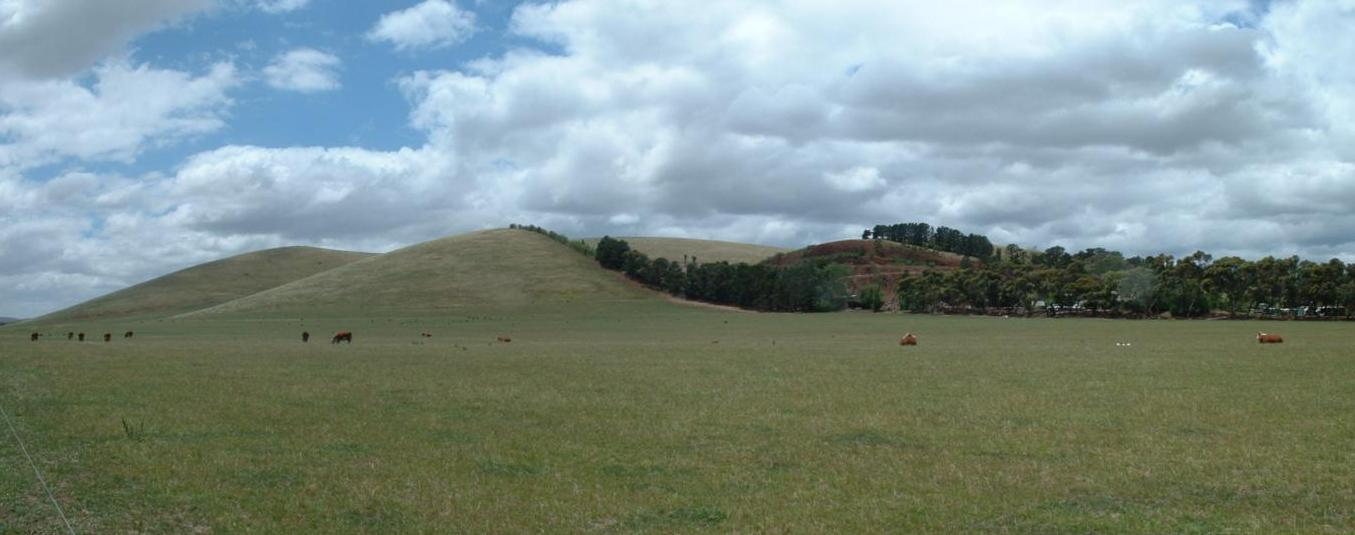
Mount Fraser panorama

Mount Fraser (54°37′S 36°21′W) is a mountain, 1,610 metres (5,280 ft) high, standing on the south coast of South Georgia immediately north of Novosilski Bay. It was surveyed by the South Georgia Survey in the period 1951–57, and named by the UK Antarctic Place-Names Committee for Francis C. Fraser, a British zoologist who was a member of the scientific staff at the Discovery Investigations Marine Station, Grytviken, 1926–27, 1928–29, and 1930, and who also worked on the Discovery in 1927, and on the Discovery II between 1929 and 1931.
