= Mount Fraser (Australia) =

Mountain in Victoria, Australia

Coordinates: 37.4639°S 144.9786°E

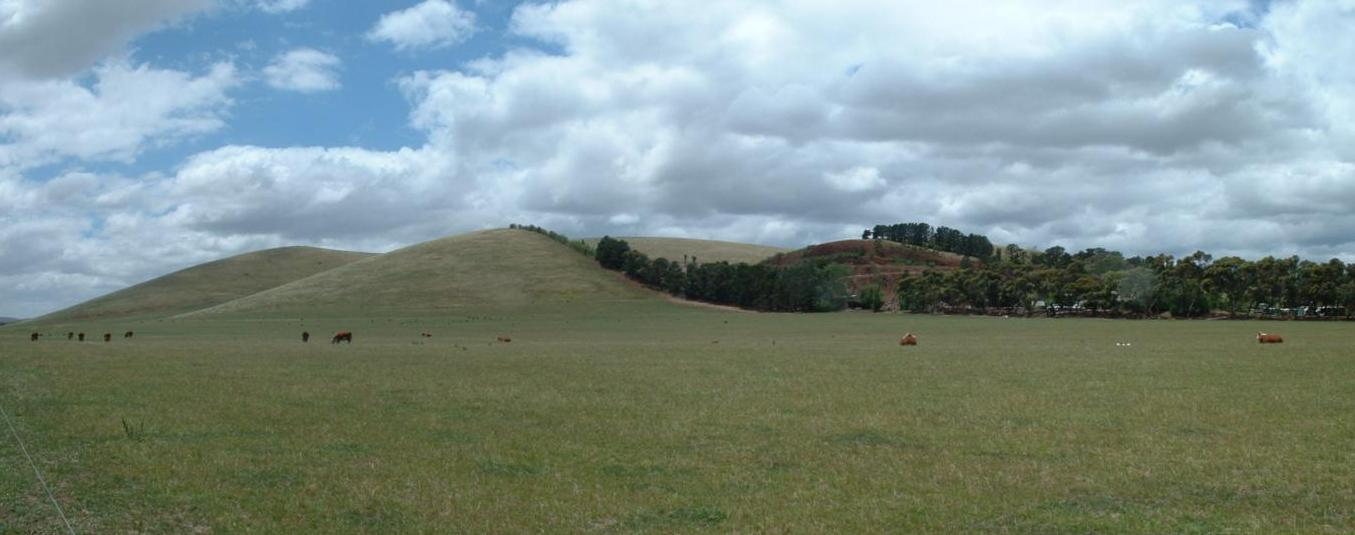
- Mount Fraser, Victoria

Highest point
- Elevation: 120 m (390 ft)

Geography
- Location within Shire of Mitchell
- Location: Victoria, Australia

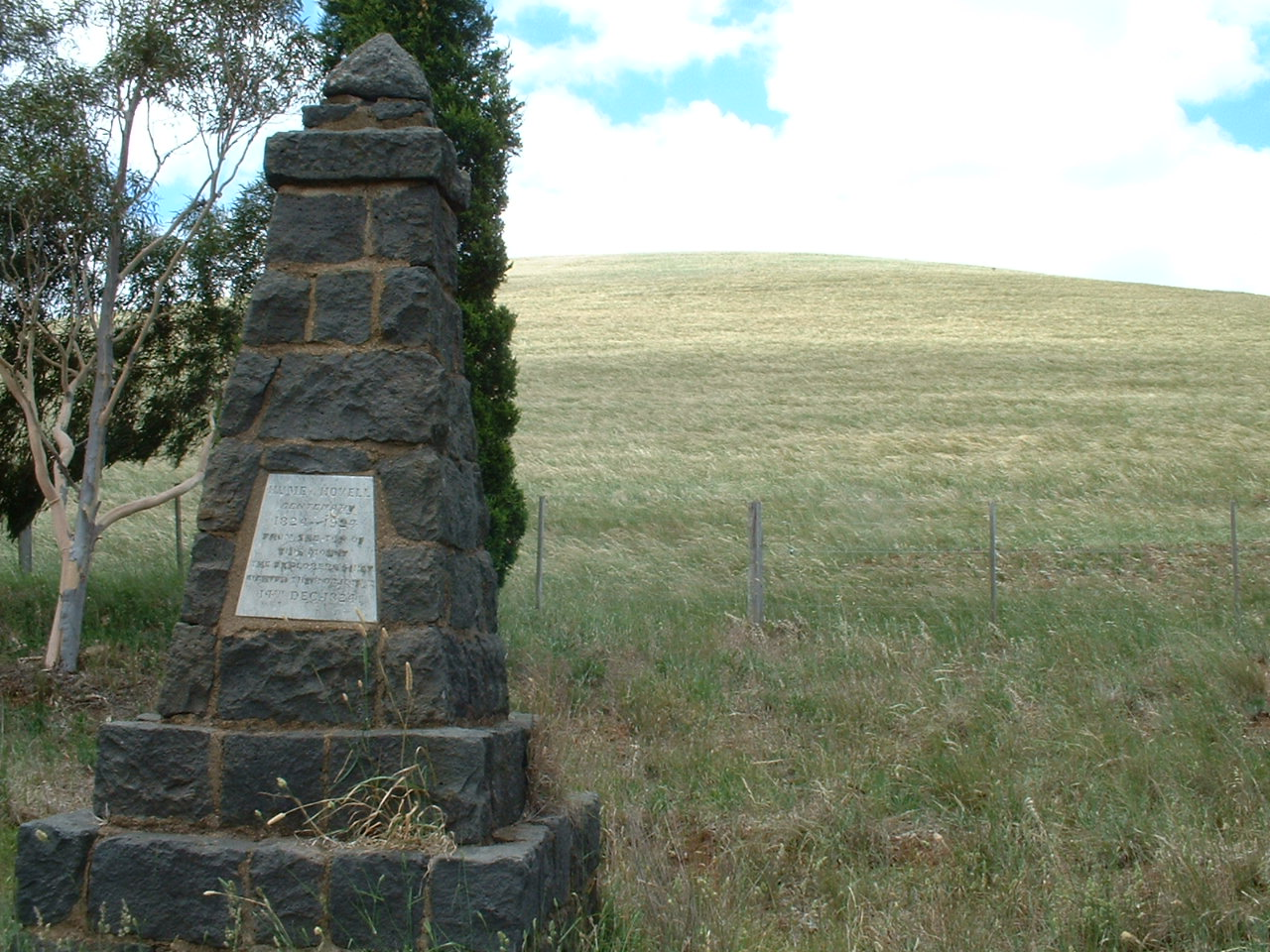
Hume and Hovell memorial at the bottom of Mount Fraser

Mount Fraser is a volcanic cone near Beveridge, Victoria, Australia. It is the largest scoria cone near Melbourne. The extinct volcano last erupted about one million years ago. It is about 120 metres in height above the surrounding land. The distance around the base of the volcano is 1200 metres. There are two craters. One crater is wide and shallow, and the other is small and closed. It is listed on the Australian Heritage database.

The explorers, Hamilton Hume and William Hovell climbed Mount Fraser on 14 December 1824, and saw Port Phillip Bay. It was called Mount Bland and Big Hill in the past. The bushranger Ned Kelly was born near Mount Fraser. The volcano was also a site for flying gliders.

There is a quarry on the side of the hill which digs out scoria for building in Melbourne.
