= Williams Landing =

Suburb in Melbourne, Victoria, Australia

- Suburb
- Interactive map of Williams Landing
- Coordinates: 37.858°S 144.739°E
- Country: Australia
- State: Victoria
- City: Melbourne
- LGA: City of Wyndham
- Location: 17.5 km (10.9 mi) from Melbourne

Government
  - State electorate: Laverton
  - Federal division: Gellibrand

Area
  - Total: 3.7 km^{2} (1.4 sq mi)
- Elevation: 15 m (49 ft)

Population
  - Total: 9,448 (2021 census)
  - Density: 2,550/km^{2} (6,610/sq mi)
- Postcode: 3027
Suburbs around Williams Landing
Truganina	Truganina	Laverton North
Hoppers Crossing	Williams Landing	Laverton
Hoppers Crossing	Point Cook	Seabrook

Williams Landing is a suburb in Melbourne, Victoria, Australia, 19 km (12 mi) south-west of Melbourne's Central Business District, located within the City of Wyndham local government area. The suburb has residential, retail and office developments, with approximately 2,400 homes and 200,000 square metres of retail and office space. It is also served by a regional public transport hub.

Williams Landing is rapidly growing and will continue to grow rapidly in the next several years, with a recorded a population of 9,448 at the 2021 census. Construction of Williams Landing commenced in early 2008 and is due to be completed by approximately 2035.

The initial development phase of Williams Landing begun with Wyndham Waters estate along Sayers Road, north of the suburb and adjacent to Truganina.

The suburb is being developed into a Transit-oriented development, major activity and employment centre. It is located next to the Williams Landing railway station, just across from the Princes Freeway. For residents of Point Cook, it is accessible via Palmers Road.

Since the opening of the Williams Landing railway station in April 2013, and the shopping centre in December 2014, the area has become one of the most popular for home buyers. Median house value in Williams Landing has increased 37% from 2012 to 2014, second highest in Victoria. Williams Landing has continued its property growth, property prices in Williams Landing rose further 25.9% in the year, according to the latest data released in November 2015.

== History ==
The major area of Williams Landing is what was once the RAAF Base Laverton airfield. The base is no longer used for operational flying but is still used for radio training. For administrative purposes, it is now merged with the former RAAF Base Point Cook, and is now known as RAAF Base Williams.

The developers of Williams Landing estate, Cedar Woods Properties Limited, worked to secure a new suburb name for the area prior to commencing development. The suburb was removed from the geographic boundaries of Laverton in 2008, with the name Williams Landing being gazetted in May 2008 and formalised by the Geographic Names Board in August.

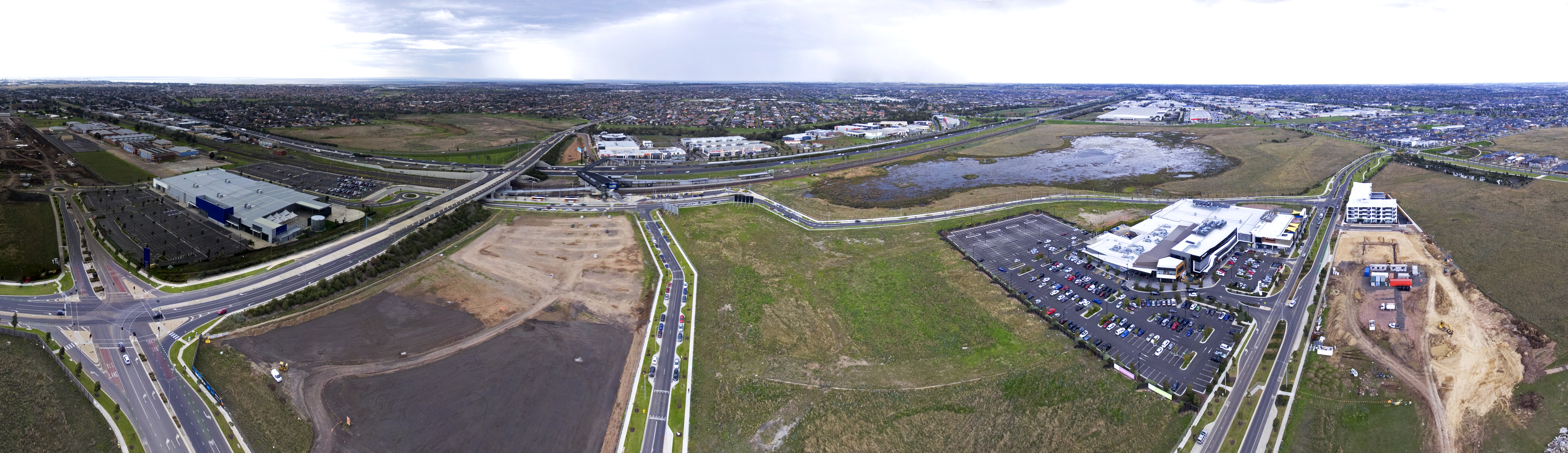
Aerial panorama of Williams Landing, facing the M1 freeway

== Williams Landing estate ==
=== Background ===
Williams Landing is being developed by Cedar Woods Properties Limited and consists of a 50-hectare town centre and train station. The development is 275 hectares in area, and is located on the existing RAAF Base Laverton airfield, with major streets forming those of the previous runway alignment. The development is identified by the State Government of Victoria as a Priority Development Zone with a Major Activity Centre.

The development has a number of parks and environmental reserves, and includes the development of the Town Centre. Williams Landing railway station opened on 28 April 2013. The three conservation reserves within Williams Landing are not open to the public and comprise over 50 hectares (120 acres) of the site.

=== Neighbourhoods ===
The development contains five distinct areas, being four residential 'Neighbourhoods' and a Town Centre zone. Of the Residential Neighbourhoods, Ashcroft, Kingwell and Elmstead are fully delivered. The Addison Neighbourhood commenced development in 2015 and is expected to be complete in 2020. The Williams Landing development is marketed at premium buyers, with each Neighbourhood having alternate design guidelines to uphold a high quality level of build. Each Neighbourhood features wide streets, mature and significant landscaping and a large amount of open space to complement the upmarket scale of the homes built by residents.

=== Town Centre and Employment Precinct ===
Williams Landing's Neighbourhoods are complemented by the new town centre, proximity and direct access to the Princes Freeway, Williams Landing railway station, and a high level of connectivity with surrounding road infrastructure. There is a large level of amenity existing and planned for the town centre area, including a shopping centre and several completed office buildings and higher density residential uses, with a significant pipeline of development in future. The progressive development of Williams Landing will deliver a significant level of road infrastructure to the benefit of surrounding suburbs.

According to the Star Weekly, proposed development in Williams Landing is expected to create about 13,000 white-collar jobs in the western suburbs over the next 15 years. The employment hub to include 5000 square metres of office space, a 50-room hotel and shops. Statistics show about 46.5 per cent of workers living in Point Cook and Williams Landing are university-qualified. Williams Landing Town Centre will create more jobs in the local area so they will no longer have to travel to Melbourne for work.

Williams Landing has been identified within the Plan Melbourne strategy as a key 'activity centre,’ providing surrounding populations with retail and service amenity, as well as a commercial employment precinct. Its position allows for convenient commuting to and from the city, helping to ease issues associated with rapid population growth in Melbourne's west. According to a report prepared by economists, Williams Landing holds the potential to employ more than 23,000 people – the majority of these in white-collar fields – based on its strategic location within one of Australia's fastest growing municipalities, the City of Wyndham.

Notable tenants include Target Australia who signed an agreement for lease with Cedar Woods for a 12,860 square metre office building, consisting of eight levels and catering for 850 employees. The building is Target Australia's new headquarters and located in Williams Landing, the 225ha master-planned community in Melbourne's west.

Cedar Woods has secured a lease with the Victorian State Government for a new office building at Williams Landing, Victoria.

Tricare Aged Care is expanding its first project in Victoria, with 263 bed aged care facility in Williams Landing in 2 phases.

The town centre is also complemented by three apartment buildings and two strata office buildings. More apartment buildings and offices are planned.

Economic research to investigate Williams Landing's employment potential by Macroplan Dimasi found there is potential for 29,000 white-collar jobs to be created in Melbourne's west by 2031 under a low growth scenario.

=== Shopping Centre ===
Home.Co, a national shopping centre owner and operator, purchased the Williams Landing Shopping Centre in March 2024 after Cedar Woods developed it in 2014.

The shopping centre was architecturally designed by Hames Sharley, and has over 25 specialty shops, a medical centre, a 106-seat childcare facility, a Woolworths supermarket, and a Zap Fitness gym. The shopping centre also has a dining area with a variety of cuisines from different cultures and about 1,800 square meters of office space.

=== Williams Landing Sporting Reserve ===
Williams Landing Boulevard Sporting Reserve is located in the heart of the Williams Landing estate surrounded by the residential areas and the Town Centre. Wyndham Council are constructing the sports reserve. This is currently under construction with stage one now complete. When stage two is complete, the reserve will feature two Australian rules/cricket ovals, six tennis courts, shelters, barbecue and picnic facilities, a playground, fitness equipment and exercise area and landscaping.

=== Greening The Pipeline initiative ===
The Greening the Pipeline initiative is a partnership between VicRoads, Wyndham City Council, City West Water and Greening the West. Under this initiative, Williams Landing has received a new community parkland along 100 metres of the Federation Trail reserve, between Lukis Avenue and McLachlan Drive. A launch event was held on 29 April 2017 for this park.

=== Criticism ===
==== School ====
Residents have complained that the Williams Landing development does not have any public schools.

==== Sports reserve ====
Local residents have criticized local council for not making better use of the land, with their preference being a school integrated with a sports reserve.

== Wyndham Waters estate ==
The Wyndham Waters estate was the first development in Williams Landing and was originally located overlapping the suburbs of Laverton and Truganina. It commenced development in 2001, with the last stage completed in 2010 and includes over 1000 households. There is a recreation centre that provides residents of Wyndham Waters a gym, outdoor pool, tennis court, steam room and sauna.

=== History ===
The historic and now disused open outfall sewer reserve physically separates the Wyndham Waters development from the newer Williams Landing development, effectively creating two separate zones in the suburb. The land which Wyndham Waters was built on was very flat and was prone to flooding. The developers Urban Property Developments Pty. Ltd. (now Asset1) had built a large waterway to mitigate flooding in the development.

== Clara estate ==
Clara estate is a 40 lot subdivisions located in the north-western corner of the suburb of Williams Landing, next to the Wyndham Waters estate. The estate was completed by developer Cedar Woods in October 2015.

== Transport ==
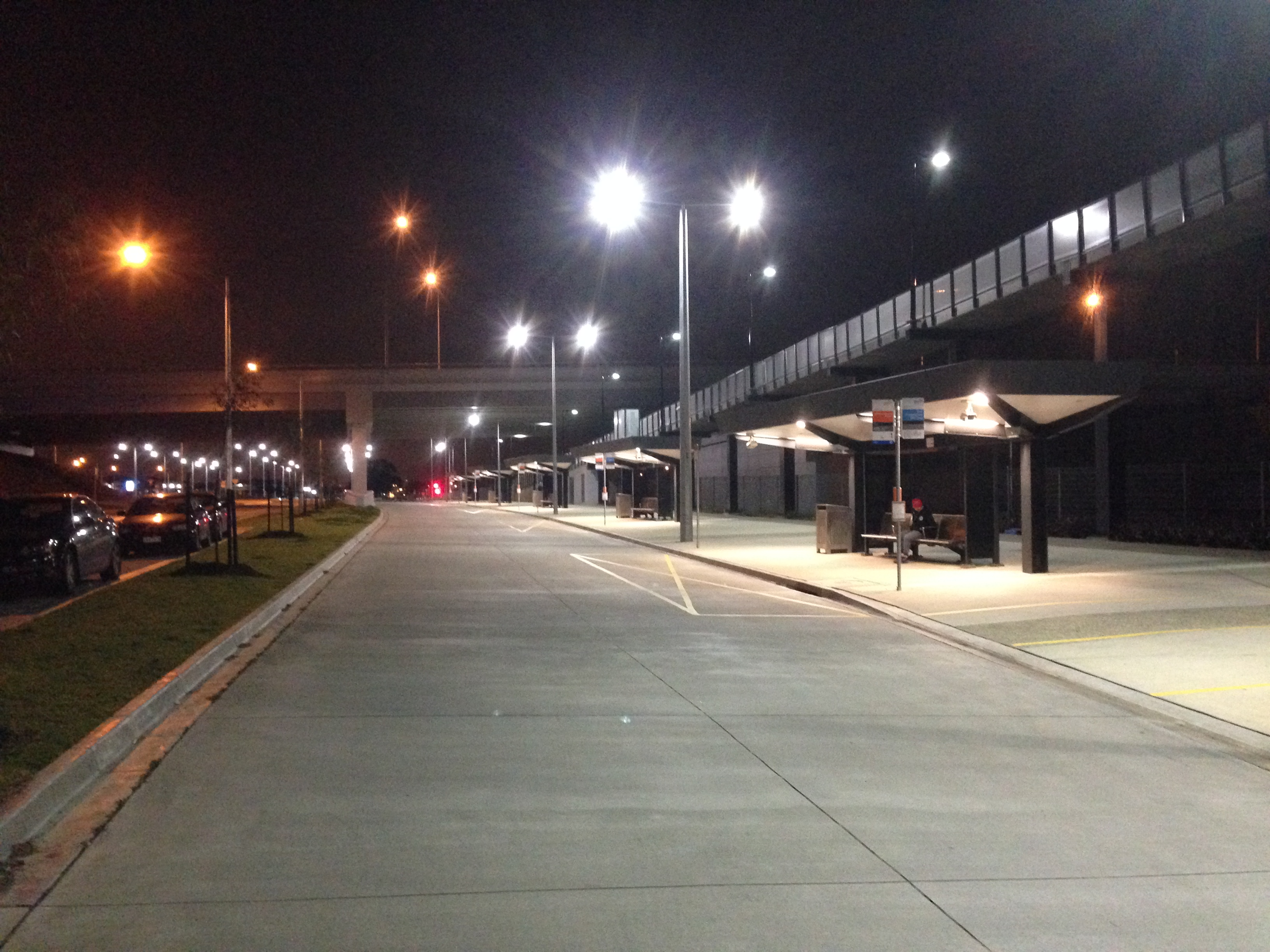
Williams Landing Bus Terminal at night

=== Train ===
Williams Landing is a major transport hub for the City of Wyndham and surrounding suburbs. Williams Landing railway station is located at the south of the Williams Landing town centre and is served by the Werribee railway line.

=== Bus ===
Williams Landing is one of the main bus hubs in the City of Wyndham. Currently, there are six bus routes connecting surrounding suburbs, activity and shopping centres.

List of bus routes in Williams Landing

- 150 - Williams Landing – Tarneit via Sayers Road
- 151 - Williams Landing – Tarneit via Westmeadows Lane
- 153 - Williams Landing – Werribee via Princes Highway
- 494 - Williams Landing – Point Cook South via Alamanda Boulevard
- 495 - Williams Landing – Point Cook South via Boardwalk Boulevard
- 497 - Williams Landing – Saltwater Coast via Point Cook Road

=== Bicycle ===
Cycling is a popular way for locals and residents who live in surrounding suburbs to get to the new train station. The popularity is increasing because of the high demand for car parking space. As at February 2015, an estimate of 500 cyclists were on the waiting list for a secure bike cage.

=== Road Network ===
Williams Landing has direct access to the Princes Freeway and an extensive road network connecting nearby suburbs. The Victorian Government has invested $1.8 billion for a comprehensive program of road upgrades and maintenance in the west, to cater to Melbourne's rapid growth.

The Western Roads Upgrade will transform eight priority roads in Melbourne's western suburbs, including:

- Dunnings Road and Palmers Road (Point Cook Road to Princes Freeway)
- Palmers Road (Princes Freeway to Western Freeway)
- Derrimut Road (Sayers Road to Dohertys Road)
- Leakes Road (Fitzgerald Road to Derrimut Road)
- Dohertys Road (Fitzgerald Road to Grieve Parade)
- Dohertys Road (Foundation Road to Palmers Road)
- Forsyth Road Interchange
- Duncans Road Interchange

This improved road connectivity will boost productivity and employment in the region.

== Local government ==
Williams Landing is located within the City of Wyndham local government area in Victoria. The suburb is represented by Williams Landing Ward on Wyndham City Council. The ward's current councillor is Larry Zhao.

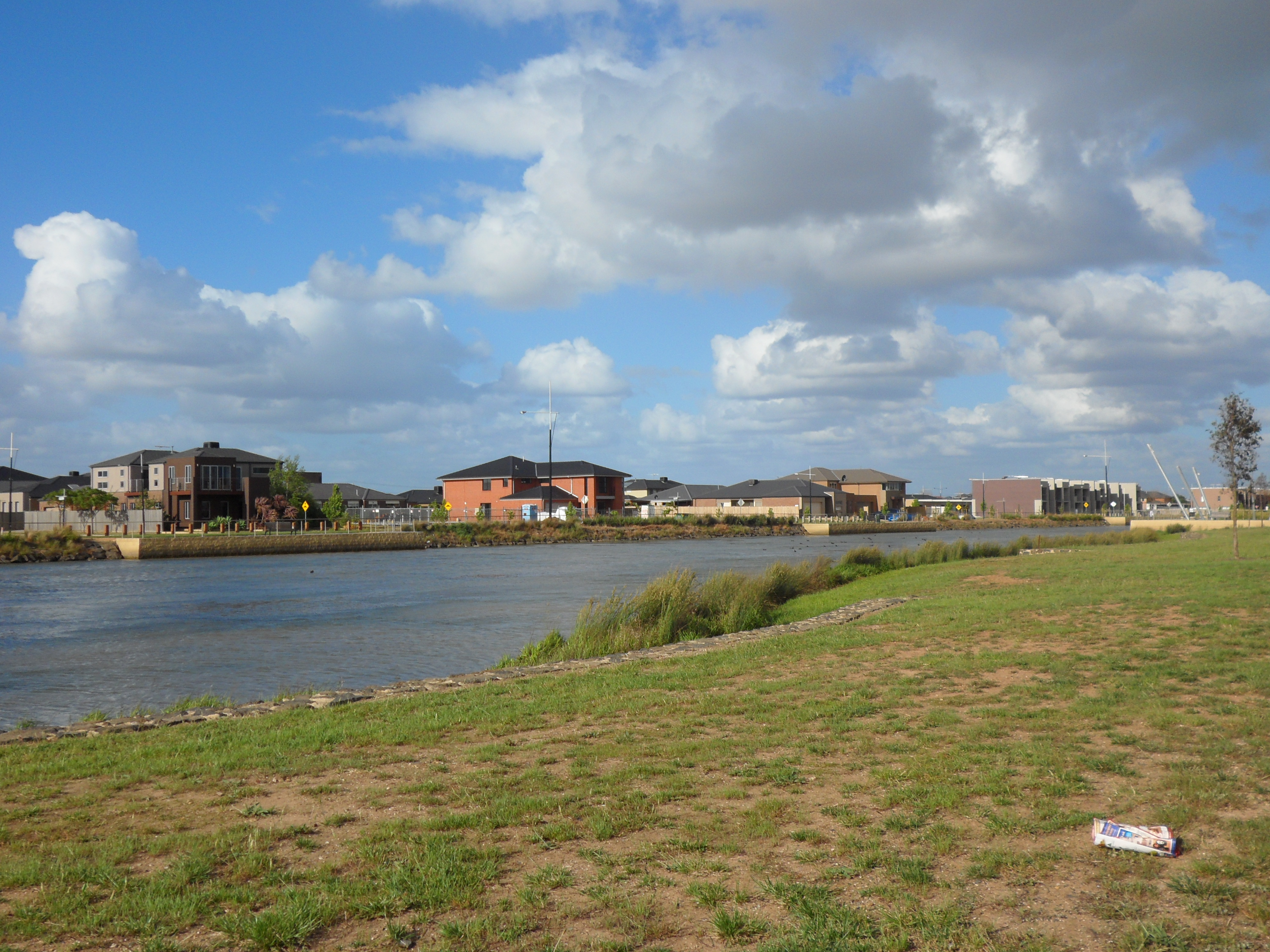
A view of a "waterway" in Wyndham Waters

Wildlife in Wyndham Waters
