= Hobsons Bay Coastal Trail =

Shared use path in Melbourne, Australia

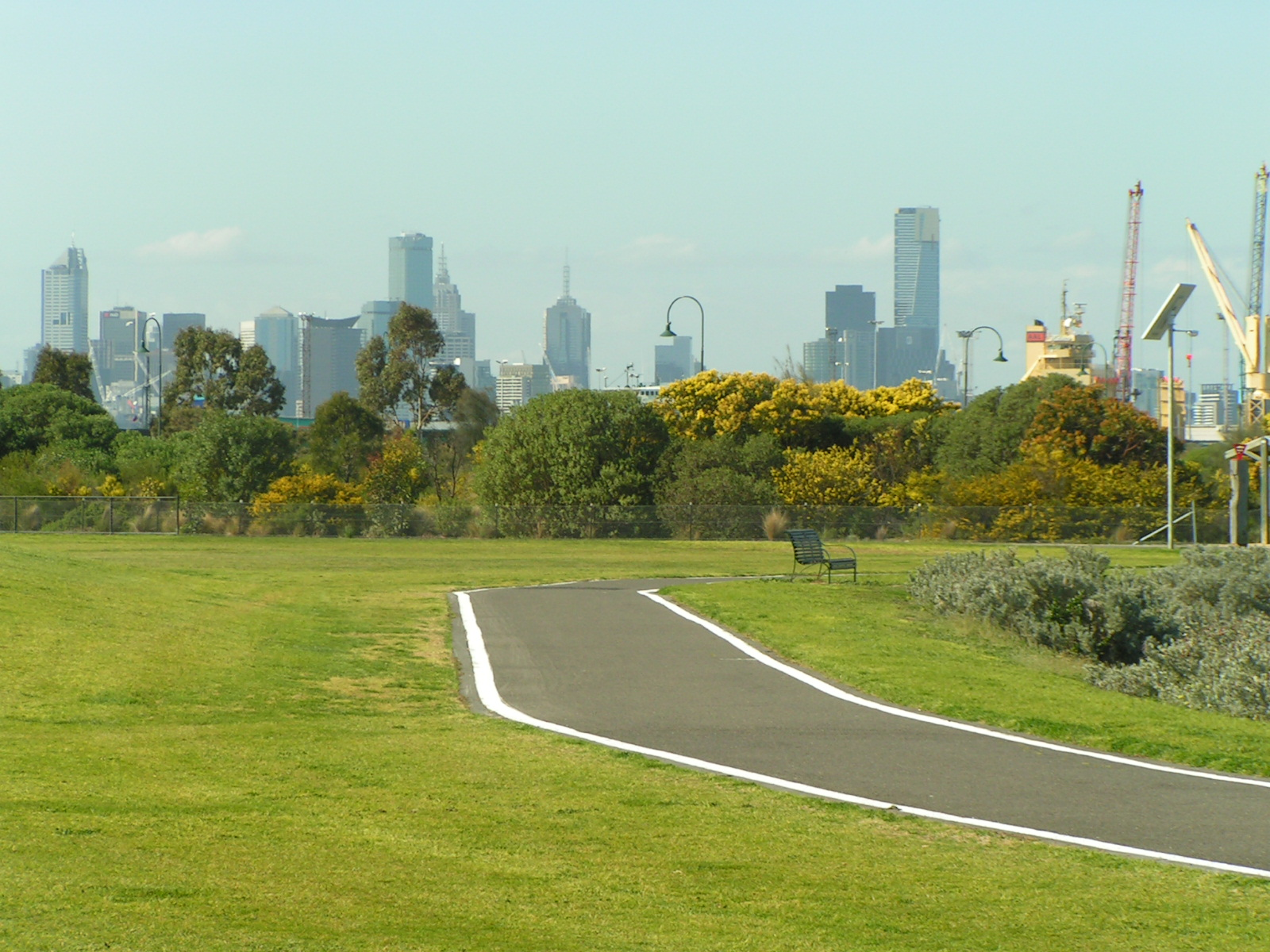
- Hobsons Bay Coastal Trail - Williamstown section
- Length: 10km from the Docklands to Williamstown via Footscray Road. 5km from Williamstown to Altona.
- Location: Melbourne, Victoria, Australia
- Difficulty: Easy
- Hazards: Shared pedestrian path on Hyde Street and Moreland Street, Yarraville section narrow.
- Hills: None
- Water: Great Bay Views along 80% of path.
- Train(s): Altona and Williamstown stations

The Hobsons Bay Coastal Trail is a shared use path for cyclists and pedestrians, which follows the coast line of Hobsons Bay in the inner western suburbs in Melbourne, Victoria, Australia. The trail forms part of the western half of the Bayside Trail which encircles Port Phillip. It runs from the west side of the Westgate bridge, south and along the coast, finishing at the Skeleton Creek Trail in Sanctuary Lakes.

== Following the Path ==
Towards the Footscray end the path connects with the Maribyrnong River Trail and passes the offices of the Lonely Planet publications. At this junction cyclists can continue north on the Maribyrnong River Trail or connect to the Footscray Road off-road path which continues directly to the Docklands and the Capital City Trail.

Between Footscray and Spotswood is a 3 metre wide off-road which continues south down Moreland Street, Whitehall Street before turning west down Somerville Road and then south again down Hyde Street for approximately 1 kilometre. Near the intersection with the West Gate Freeway off-ramp, a shared path goes west towards the Federation Trail. Under the West Gate Bridge the 3 metre trail continues south along the banks of the Yarra River for approximately 3 km to Williamstown. From here continuous paths can be followed to Altona.

Near the Scienceworks Museum at Craig Street, Spotswood, the Westgate Punt takes cyclists, along with pedestrians, across the Yarra River to the Bay Trail at Lorimer Street in Port Melbourne. This service is available on weekday mornings and afternoons and on demand on weekends for most of the year except Christmas, Boxing Day and Good Friday or when bad weather makes ferry crossings unsuitable.

== Connections ==
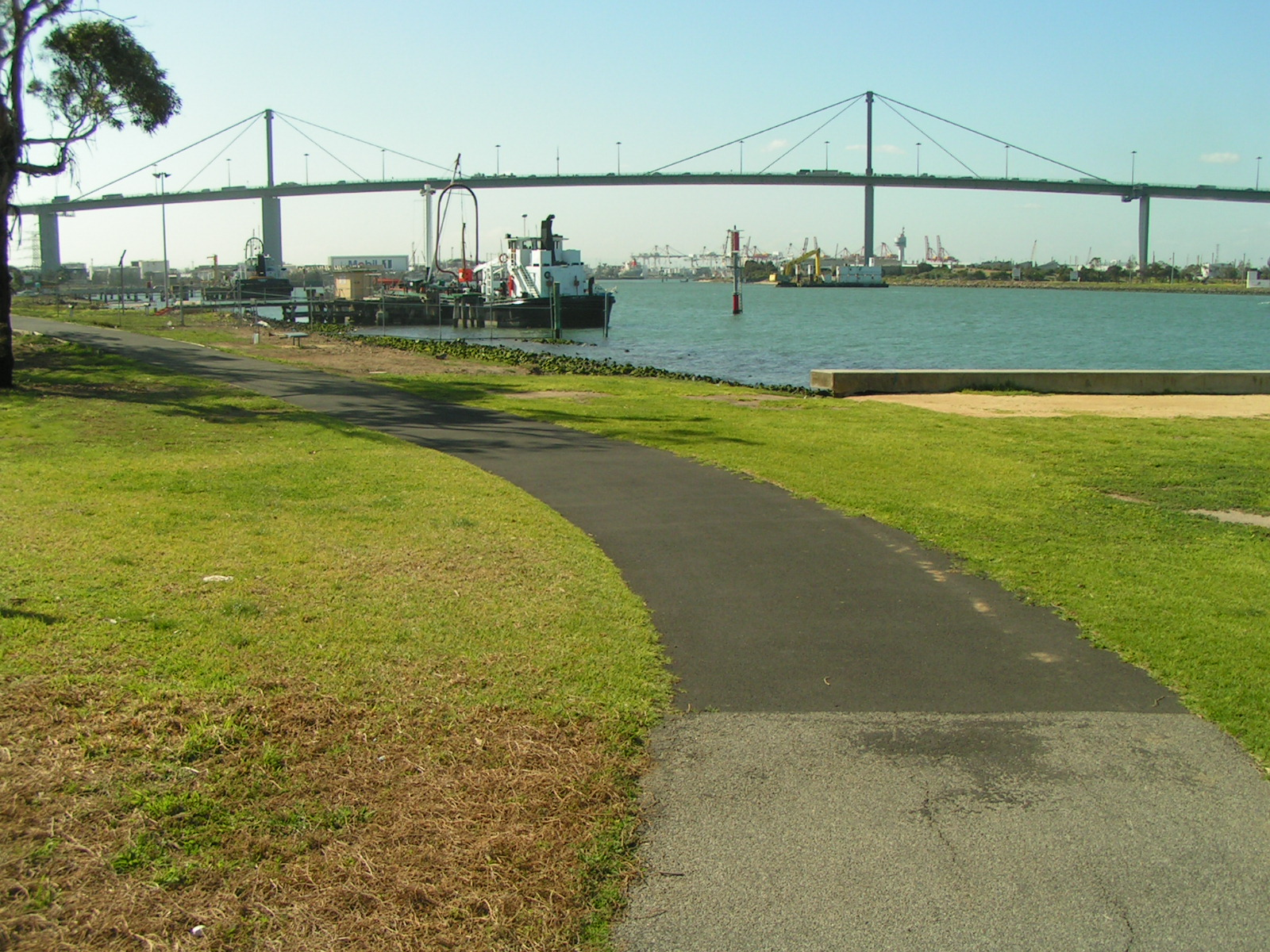
Hobsons Bay Coastal Trail looking towards the West Gate Bridge

In the north is the Maribyrnong River Trail as well as the Footscray Road Path which connects to the Capital City Trail in Docklands. In Spotswood, the Federation Trail connects at Hyde Street. Heading south the trail goes through Williamstown and intersects the lower Kororoit Creek Trail in Altona, then the Laverton Creek Trail. In the south the path terminates at the Skeleton Creek Trail in Altona Meadows.

- North end at 37.831687°S 144.895411°E (the punt)
- South end at 37.896534°S 144.781834°E.
