= Werribee =

- Suburb
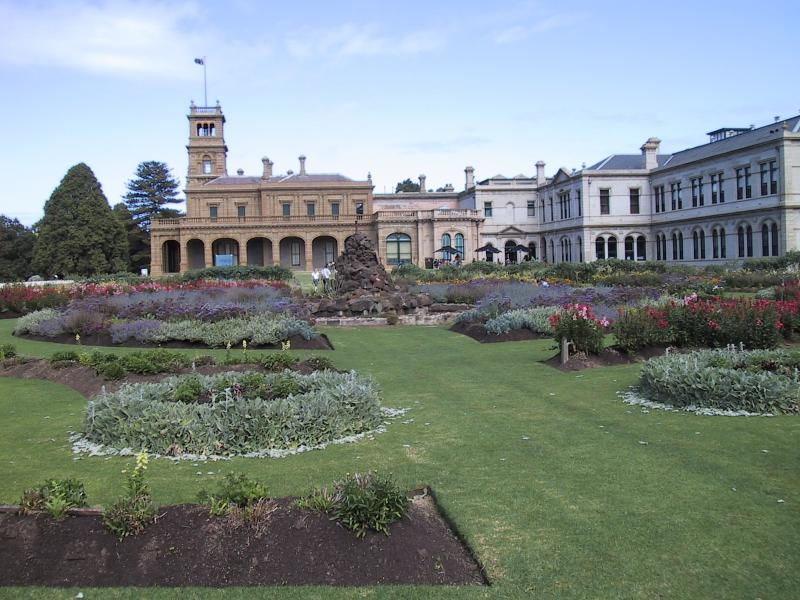
- Werribee Park

- Interactive map of Werribee
- Coordinates: 37.900°S 144.664°E
- Country: Australia
- State: Victoria
- City: Melbourne
- LGA: City of Wyndham
- Location: 32 km (20 mi) from Melbourne; 45 km (28 mi) from Geelong

Government
  - State electorate: Werribee
  - Federal divisions: Lalor; Corio

Area
  - Total: 23.8 km^{2} (9.2 sq mi)
- Elevation: 26 m (85 ft)

Population
  - Total: 50,027 (2021 census)
  - Density: 2,102/km^{2} (5,444/sq mi)
- Postcode: 3030
Suburbs around Werribee
Wyndham Vale	Tarneit	Hoppers Crossing
Mambourin	Werribee	Point Cook
Cocoroc	Werribee South	Werribee South

Werribee is a suburb in Melbourne, Victoria, Australia, 32 km (20 mi) south-west of Melbourne's Central Business District, located within the local government area of the City of Wyndham. Werribee recorded a population of 50,027 at the 2021 census.

Werribee was established as an agricultural settlement in the 1850s, originally named Wyndham and later renamed Werribee (derived from the Aboriginal name meaning "backbone" or "spine") in 1904. The suburb is situated on its namesake the Werribee River, approximately halfway between Melbourne and Geelong, on the Princes Highway. It is the administrative centre of the City of Wyndham local government area and is the City's most populous centre. Werribee is part of the Greater Melbourne metropolitan area and is included in the capital's population statistical division.

Since the 1990s, the suburb has experienced rapid suburban growth into surrounding greenfield land, becoming a commuter town in the Melbourne–Geelong growth corridor. Due to this urban sprawl, Wyndham and its suburbs have merged into the Melbourne conurbation. In recent years, Werribee has undergone development which has seen the growth of high-rise buildings within the city centre.

The suburb is best known for its major tourist attractions, which include the former estate of wealthy pastoralist Thomas Chirnside, known as Werribee Park, the Victoria State Rose Garden, the Werribee Park National Equestrian Centre, and the Werribee Open Range Zoo.

== History ==
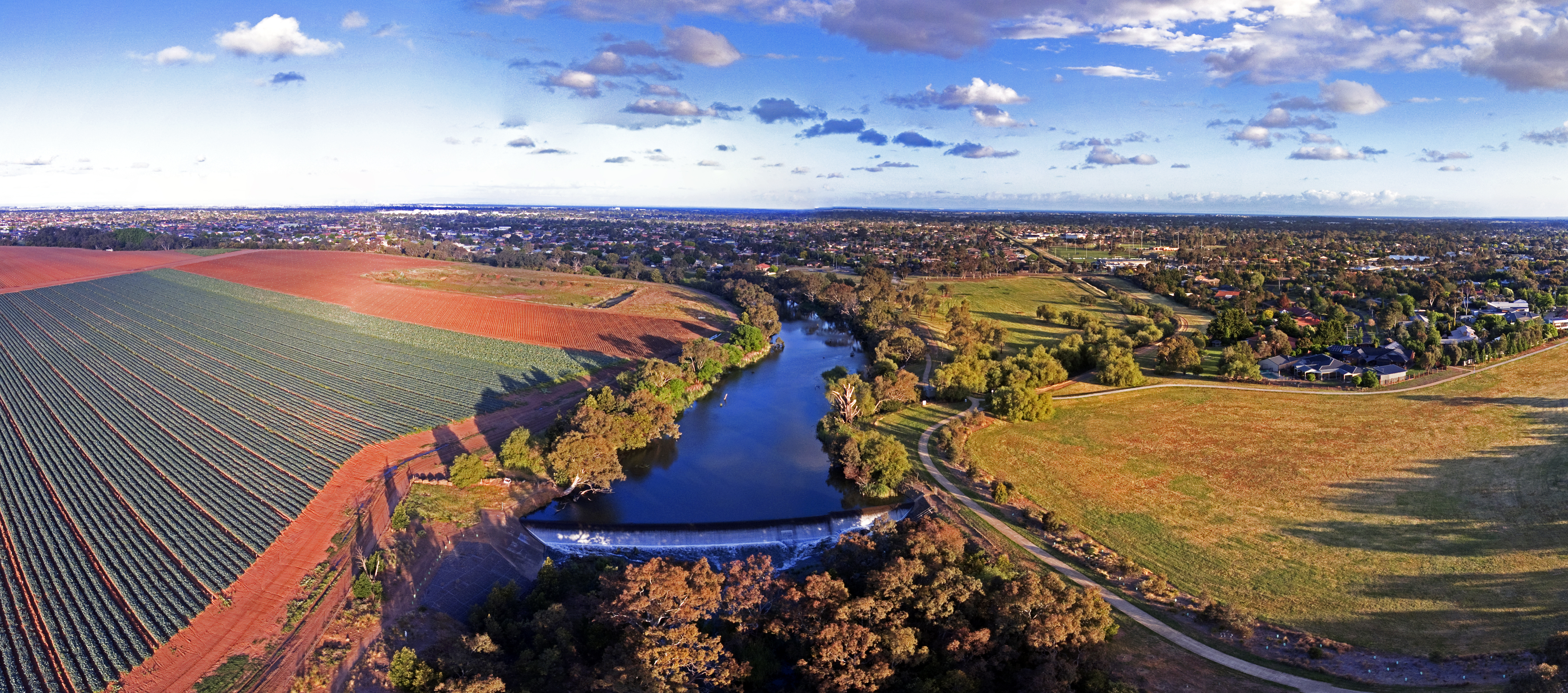
Werribee River, near Riverbend Historic Park

The name "Werribee" originated from the Victorian Aboriginal name for the Werribee River, Wirribi-yaluk in Wathawurrung and Boonwurrung, wirribi meaning "backbone" or "spine".

Early leasing of pastures was led by members of John Batman's Port Phillip Association. A rural township began in the early 1850s. This village was named Wyndham (the name of the local municipality today). The name derived from a suggestion by the owner of a local village inn, Elliott Armstrong, who sought to honour Scottish soldier Sir Henry Wyndham. The Post Office opened on 12 January 1858 as Wyndham and was renamed Werribee in 1904. However, its adjacent river was called the Werribee River, and the town's name was later changed to Werribee in 1884, and the Shire Council at that time was also renamed Werribee in 1909. The Shire at the time was quite large; extending from the inner Western suburbs of Melbourne to Little River to the northward town of Melton, covering 715 square kilometres.

Werribee at this time was very popular for development. Thomas Chirnside, a person famous in this area even today, was attracted to the open plain's suitability for agricultural uses. By 1863 he controlled more than 280 square kilometres around Werribee. Chirnside bought other smaller holdings of land at this time. The town grew steadily, helped by a railway line from Melbourne to Geelong, with a station at Werribee in 1857.

Thomas Chirnside committed suicide in 1887. He was found dead in the laundry at Werribee Park with a shotgun lying beside him. His brother Andrew died three years later, and the property was now divided between Andrew's two sons. A new mansion was built, called "The Manor" (not in the same place as the current suburb of Manor Lakes).

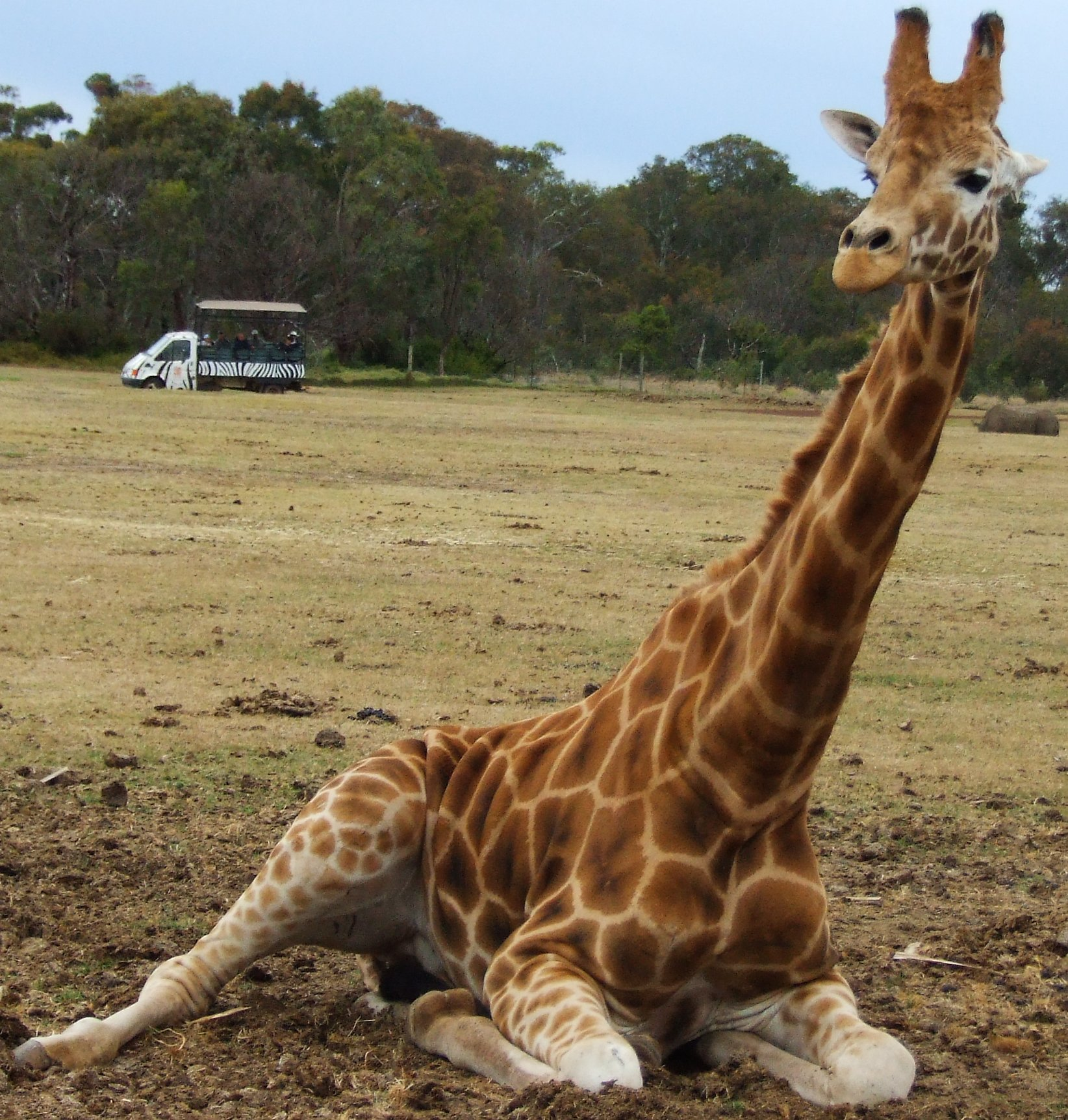
Safari at the Werribee Open Range Zoo

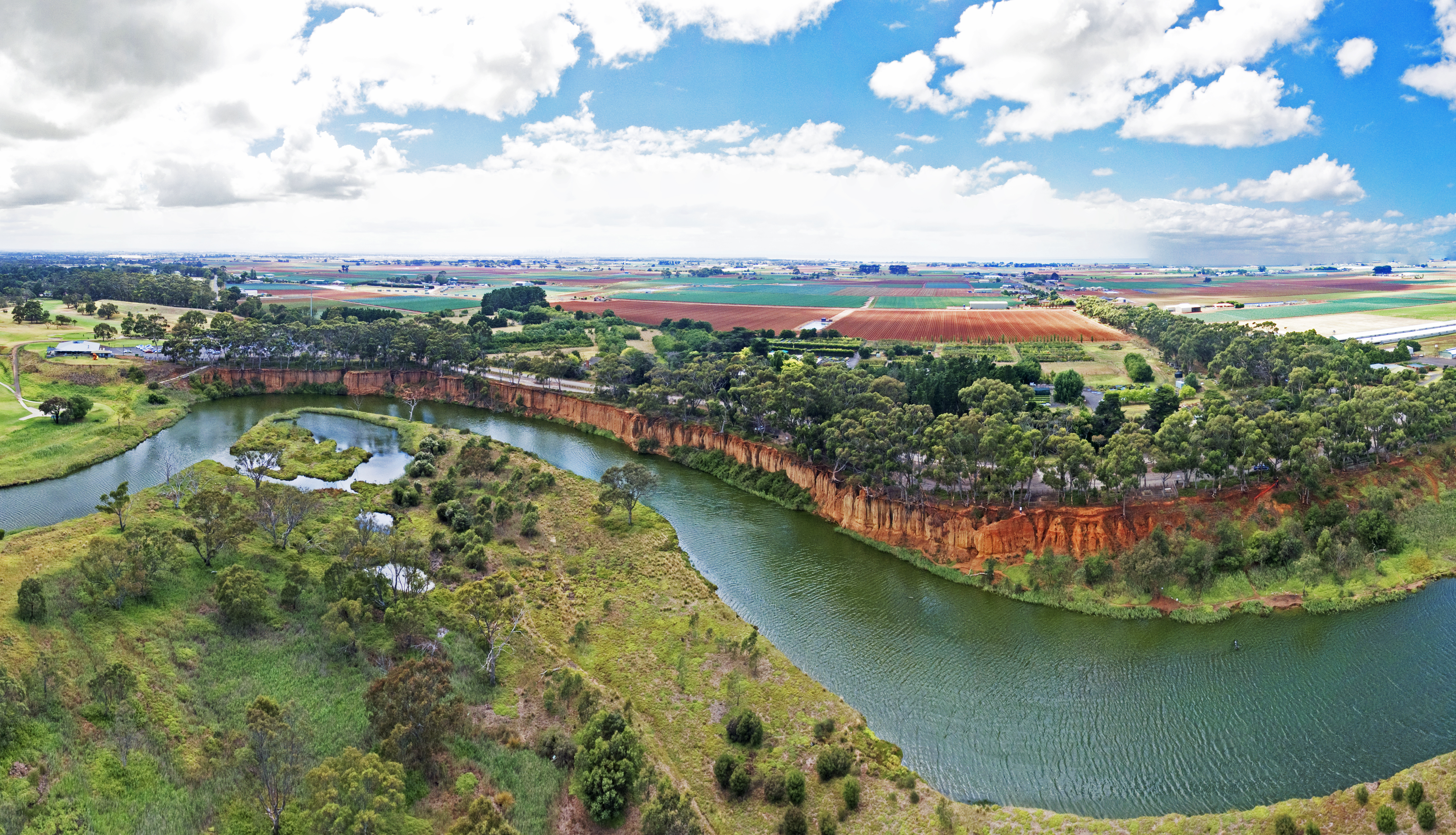
Aerial perspective of the K Road cliffs along the Werribee River

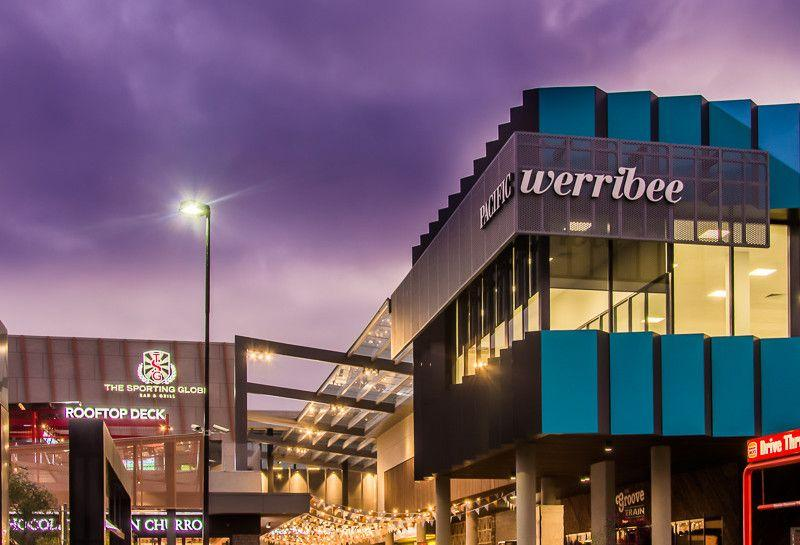
Pacific Werribee, major shopping centre for Werribee and surrounding suburbs

In 1881 a quarter of the Shire's population lived in the Werribee Township. There were hotels there, as well as recreational venues such as the Werribee Racecourse (built in 1879) as well as the Mechanics' Institute (built in 1883).

From 1923 to 1973, Chirnside's property was the site of Corpus Christi College, the seminary of the Catholic Church for Victoria and Tasmania.

Werribee has the highest rates of crime in Wyndham, with recent significant crime increases.

== Neighbouring suburbs ==
Werribee's central business district is located along Watton Street; the civic centre (council chambers) being just 500 metres away also makes it the administrative centre of the City of Wyndham. Werribee is surrounded by several mostly residential suburbs: Wyndham Vale to the north-west, Hoppers Crossing and Tarneit to the north, Truganina and Williams Landing to the north-east, and Point Cook to the east. The market gardens and well-known tourist precinct are found in Werribee South, on the other side of the Maltby Bypass.

The area's major regional shopping centre, the Pacific Werribee Shopping Centre is actually located just across the suburb boundary in Hoppers Crossing.

== Transport ==
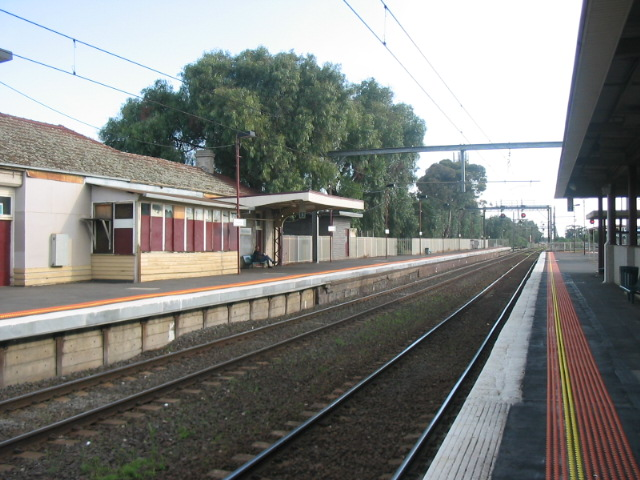
Werribee railway station

=== Road ===
Werribee's town centre and its Civic Centre (council offices) are located adjacent to the Princes Highway, known locally as Synnot Street. Major local arterial roads Derrimut Road and Old Geelong Road (as an extension of Morris Road) connect the highway to the City of Wyndham's north, as does Cherry Street. Ballan Road is the major arterial to Wyndham's north-west.

The CBD also links with the Princes Freeway via Duncans Road to the south-east, and via Geelong Road (the continuation of the Princes Highway) to the south west. The Princes Freeway circumvents the township via a section, known as the Maltby Bypass, which opened in June 1961.

=== Public transport ===
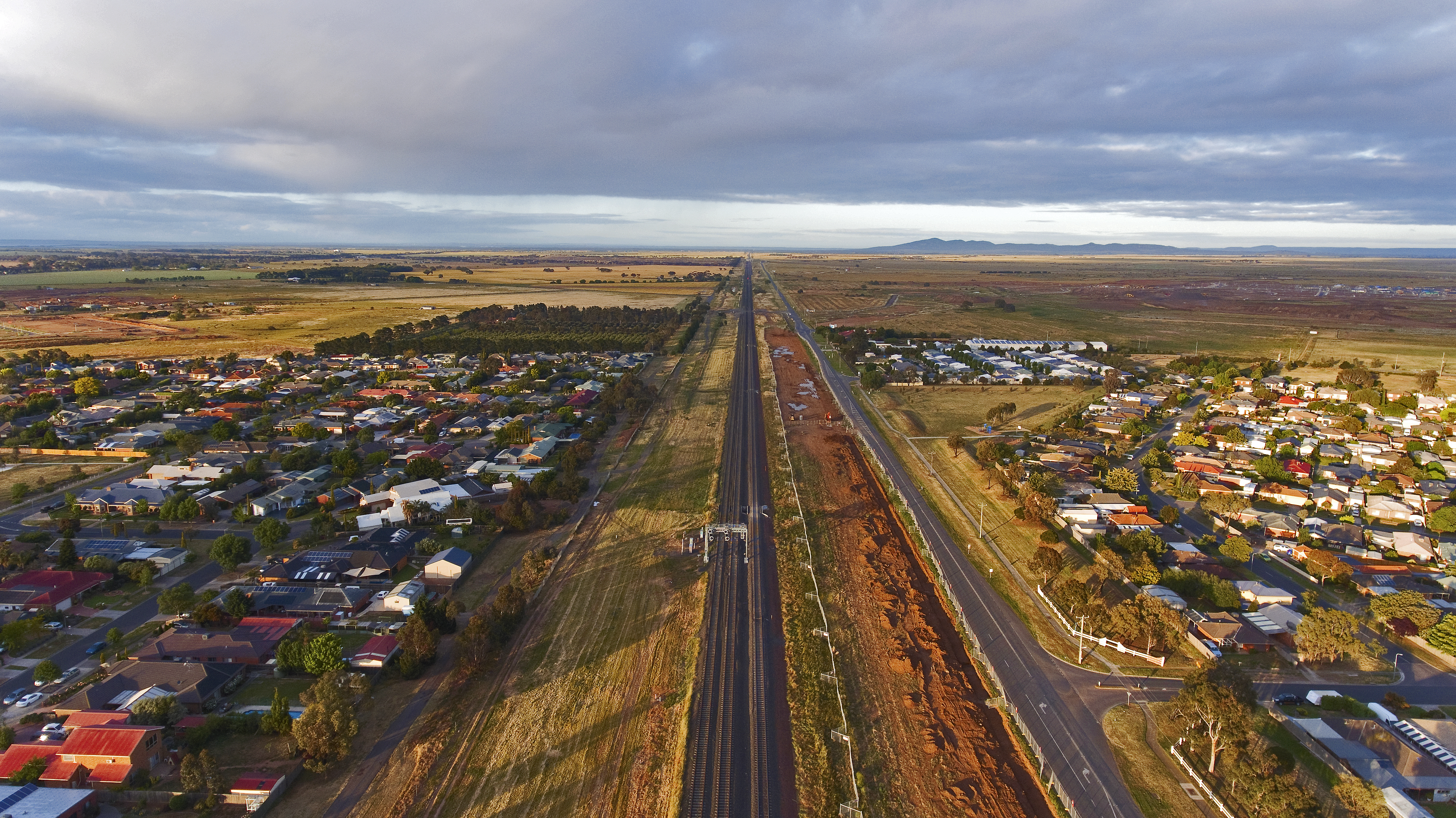
Werribee, facing the You Yangs to the west. Taken 2017.

There are two major railway stations in the area – Werribee railway station and Hoppers Crossing railway station to the north-east, both part of the Melbourne metropolitan network. Werribee station is the terminus of the Werribee line. V/Line services to and from Geelong ceased in mid 2015 due to the completion of the Regional Rail Link which sees trains diverted out towards Wyndham Vale.

A disused station exists on the line near Werribee Racecourse, which at times has had calls to be reopened. Additionally, tracks have been left spread apart for a future station near Derrimut Road. Further suburban stations to the north and west have been constructed on a new line as part of the Regional Rail Link to be joined with the regional rail network.

An extensive bus network links Werribee with neighbouring suburbs, with major bus interchanges at Werribee station, Wyndham Vale railway station, Tarneit railway station, Pacific Werribee and Hoppers Crossing station.

=== Cycling ===
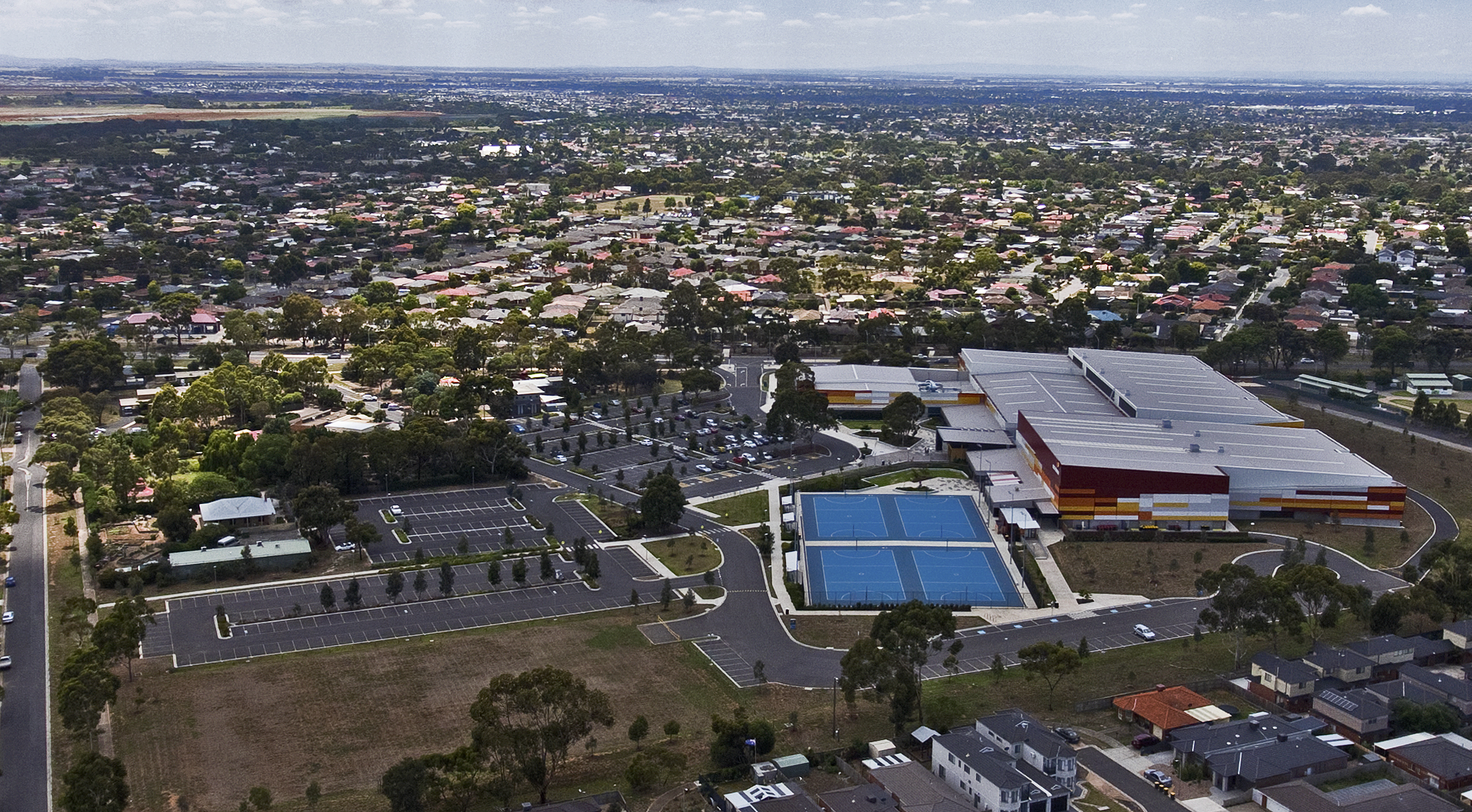
Aerial perspective of Eagle Stadium, Werribee

Wyndham City Council is consistently one of the highest spending councils when it comes to bicycle infrastructure.

Major trails include:

- The Federation Trail – from Werribee River to Millers Road, Altona North;
- The Werribee River Trail – from Davis Creek, Tarneit, connecting with the Federation Trail, and continuing south towards Werribee Park.

== Health ==
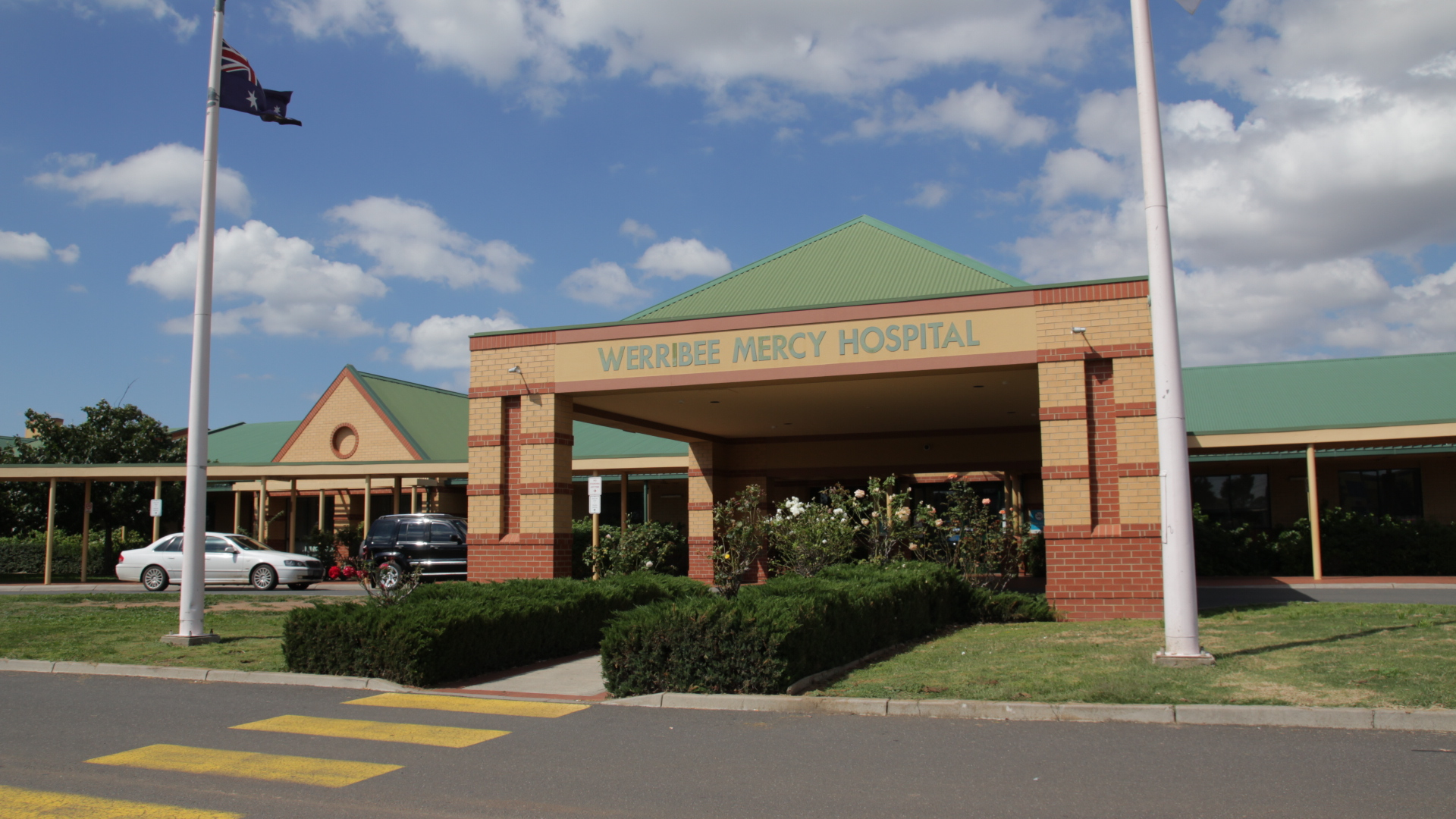
Werribee Mercy Hospital

The City of Wyndham and surrounding areas are serviced by the Werribee Mercy Hospital, which opened in 1994 to replace the now defunct Werribee District Hospital. It is a major provider of mental health care and maternity services for the local area.

A new multi disciplinary, purpose-built medical facility was recently built opposite the Mercy Hospital, to be known as Wyndham Private Medical Centre. It includes a general practice clinic, specialist suites, allied health, mental health and pathology services.

Werribee Bears play rugby league in NRL Victoria.

== Education ==
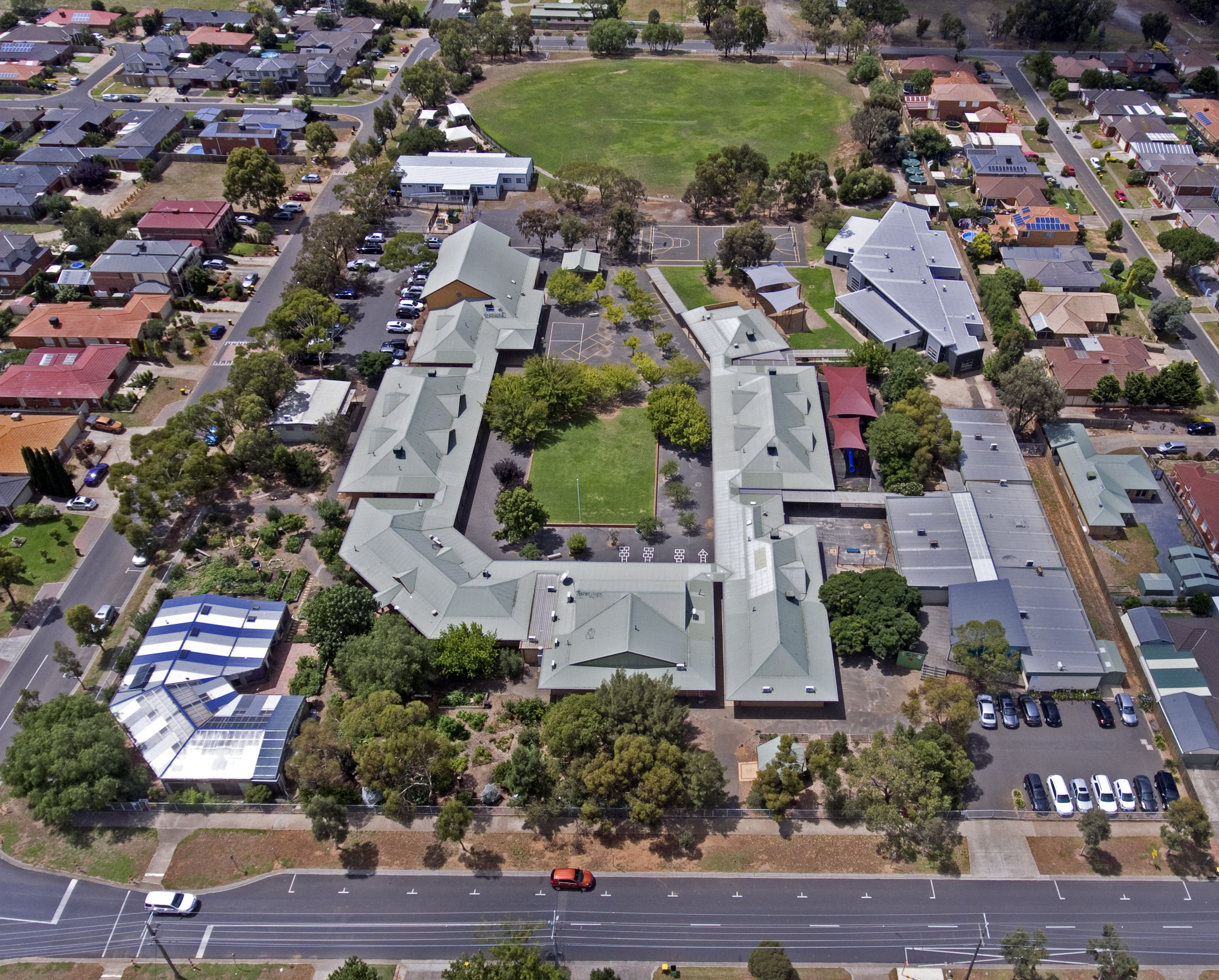
Aerial perspective of Thomas Chirnside School. Feb 2018.

Primary education is provided by numerous public, private and Catholic schools, some of which are combined with secondary education as one P-12 college (denoted c.).

- Werribee Primary
- St Andrews Primary
- Corpus Christi Primary
- Glen Devon Primary (now merged with Glen Orden)
- Wyndham Park Primary (formerly Glen Orden)
- Heathdale Christian College (c.)
- Bethany Catholic Primary
- Westgrove Primary
- Manorvale Primary
- Thomas Chirnside Primary
- Cambridge Primary School

Secondary education is provided by a range of public, private and Catholic colleges, also with some being combined with primary education as one P-12 college.

- Werribee Secondary College
- MacKillop Catholic Regional College
- Heathdale Christian College (c.)
- Suzanne Cory High School, a new public selective entry school (year 9 - 12)
- Wyndham Central College

Tertiary education is Provided by a number of university and TAFE campuses, which are all located in the Werribee Employment Precinct – a large area between the Princes Highway and Freeway.

- Victoria University, Werribee campus provides both university and TAFE services, and includes the Industrial Skills Training Centre
- University of Melbourne Melbourne Veterinary School, Werribee campus is the only veterinary school in Victoria, and an internationally recognised specialised training centre.
- University of Notre Dame Australia The Melbourne Clinical School is primarily partnered with Mercy Health Care and located adjacent to Werribee Mercy Hospital. The Clinical School is also affiliated with other metropolitan hospitals including Western Health, St Vincent’s Health Care, Calvary Health Care (Bethlehem Hospital) and a variety of local community-based health facilities.

== Notable residents ==
- Anthony Callea – Singer
- Merv Hughes – Cricketer
- Orlando Jordan – Former Professional Wrestler
- Russell Mark – Olympic shooter
- Luke Mathews – Runner
- Brent Prismall – Australian rules footballer
- Ella Sabljak – Australian women's wheelchair basketball player
- Danny Tiatto – Soccer player
- Ricky Muscat - Singer
- Daine - Singer
