= Skeleton Waterholes Creek =

River in Victoria, Australia

Coordinates: 37°50′24″S 144°42′21″E

The Skeleton Waterholes Creek is a waterway in the outer western and outer south-western regions of Melbourne, Victoria. The creek rises near Mount Cottrell, to the south of Rockbank, and passes through rural land until it reaches the suburban areas of Tarneit, Truganina, Hoppers Crossing, Altona Meadows and Point Cook before it flows into Port Phillip Bay after the Cheetham Wetlands.

The creek is located on the traditional lands of the Wurundjeri people and has important spiritual significance. Parts of the creek are popular sites for various forms of recreation.

A brick-arched aqueduct carries the Main Outfall Sewer across the creek in Hoppers Crossing.

== Environmental condition ==
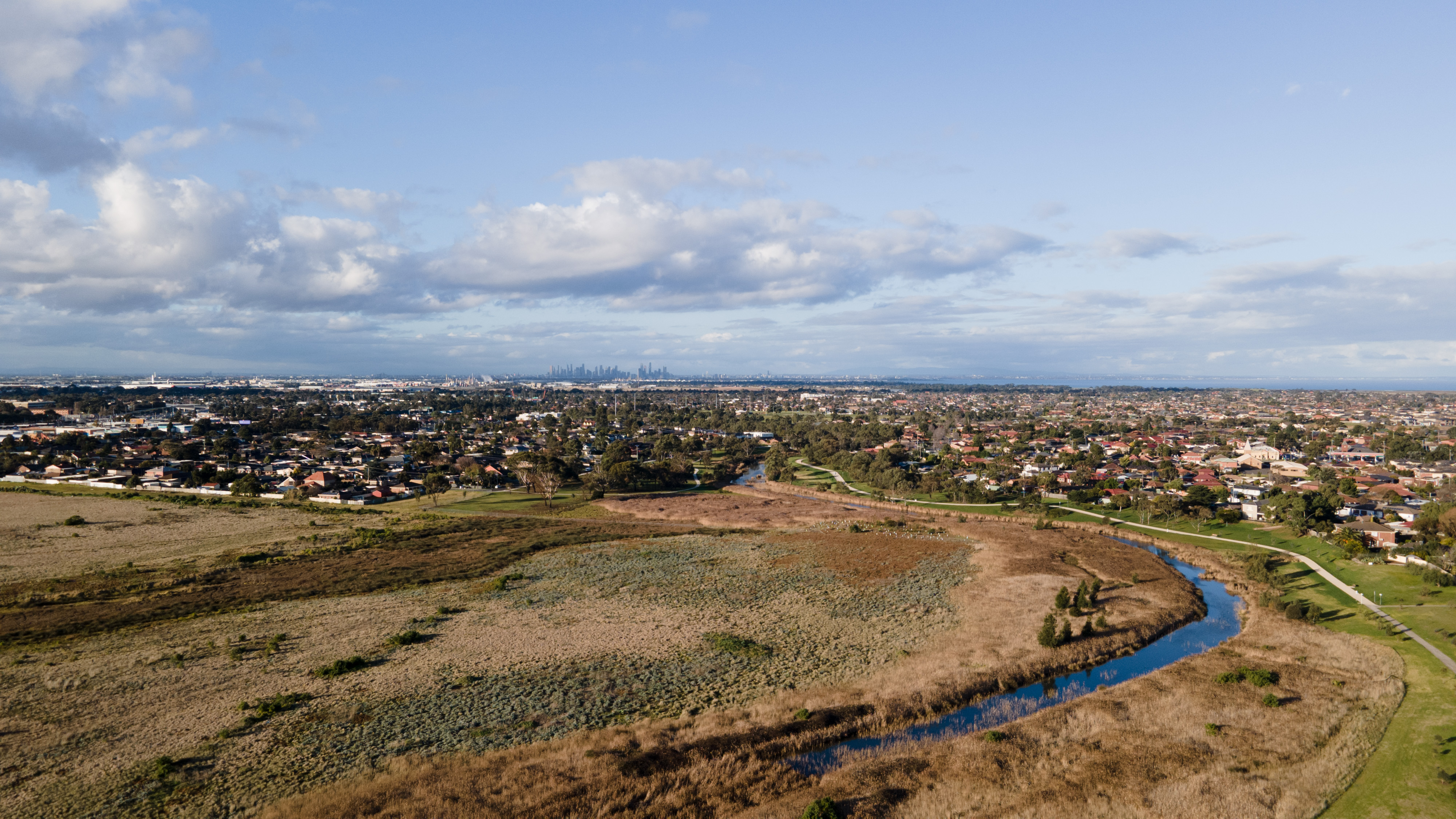
View of Melbourne city skyline looking over parkland at Skeleton Creek in Point Cook.

It has been classed as being in "moderate condition" by Melbourne Water, but it is becoming increasingly urbanised as new developments extend across the catchment from Hoppers Crossing and surrounding areas. This new development poses a major risk to the health of the river, as does the poor quality of both the creek's water and streamside vegetation along significant parts of the waterway.

A recent defence force study of PFAS contamination on defence bases has indicated some groundwater contamination from sites at the partially decommissioned Williams Landing airforce base. Hydrological studies show that this groundwater flows into Skeleton Creek, and caution should be taken with consuming fish and eels from this creek.

== See also ==
- Federation Trail
- Skeleton Creek Trail, a cycling and walking trail along the southern part of the creek
