= Laverton Creek Trail =

Shared use path in Australia

- Length: 4.7km
- Location: Melbourne, Victoria, Australia
- Difficulty: Easy
- Hazards: Merton St underpass can be underwater after heavy rain
- Surface: Dirt, gravel, concrete and bitumen
- Hills: None
- Train: Laverton station
- Tram: None

The Laverton Creek Trail is a shared use path for cyclists and pedestrians, which follows Laverton Creek in the outer western suburbs of Laverton and Altona in Melbourne, Victoria, Australia.

The southern part of the trail is now suitable for roadbikes.

== Following the Path ==
The Hobsons Bay Coastal Trail crosses the Laverton Creek over a long wooden footbridge, some 0.5 km from the river mouth. The Laverton creek trail starts at this point. Head upstream - either side can be used - with a concrete path on the north side and an old track on the south side. If using the north side, cross to the south side of the creek, when the first road bridge at Queen St is encountered.

Cross Queen St on the south side of the creek. The path is mainly concrete which previously had an intervening rough gravel section that became submerged in wet conditions, however the concreting of this section has now been completed. The path appears to come to an end at the juncture of Railway Ave and Merton St, 2.5 km from Queen St.

Take to the road and cross under the railway line, along Merton St, over the rough bluestone surface. Immediately turn left (SW) and take to the rough dirt track parallel to the railway line amongst the weeds. 250m later the path goes directly under the Princes Highway. Out the other side, in Watts St, turn right (north) parallel to the highway. This quiet street leads to the east end of McCormick Park. A path soon appears that leads to the west end of McCormick Park at Bladin St.

From Bladin St, the Federation Trail can be reached via Wackett St, Old Geelong Rd and Lawrie Emmins Reserve. This route takes a very rough track past a motocross course and an archery range, both located in Lawrie Emmins Reserve - not highly recommended.

== Connections ==
Dead end in the north west at Bladin St and McCormick Park. It is possible, with some ingenuity, to traverse to the Federation Trail from McCormick Park. Laverton station can be reached using Bladin St or Watt St.

The path connects to the Hobsons Bay Coastal Trail in the south west.

West end at 37.857932°S 144.770780°E. East end at 37.879988°S 144.801238°E.
