= Hoppers Crossing Secondary College =

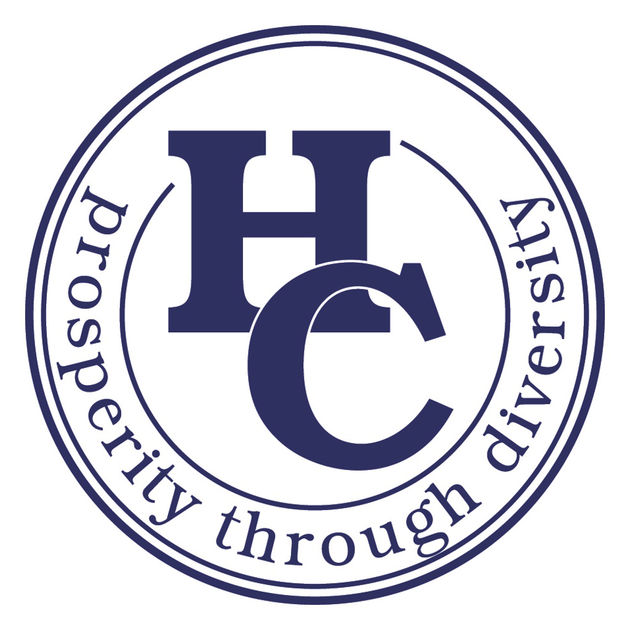

Location
- Hoppers Crossing, Victoria; Australia; 37°52′23″S 144°41′48″E

Information
- School type: Public, comprehensive, coeducational, secondary school
- Motto: Prosperity Through Diversity
- Established: 1984
- Principal: Rod Kendall
- Staff: ~170
- Grades: 7–12
- Enrolment: ~1,500
- Houses: McGrath, Whitten, Freeman, Camplin,
- Colours: Maroon and navy (sports) , white (academic)
- Website: www.hopcross.vic.edu.au

Hoppers Crossing Secondary College, formerly Hoppers Crossing Post Primary School, is a secondary college in Hoppers Crossing, Victoria, Australia. It was established in 1984.

== College profile ==
Opened in 1984, Hoppers Crossing Secondary College grew rapidly and in 1989, the first cohort of Year 12, the enrolment peaked at 1,232, thus the college became the fourth largest secondary college in the state.

The current enrolment is approximately 1500. The college has consolidated its curriculum. Situated in an urban growth corridor, approximately 20 minutes west of Melbourne, the college welcomes students from Years 7 to 12 from Hoppers Crossing and other close by suburbs.

== Curriculum ==
The College offers students a comprehensive curriculum. The College has extensively redesigned its curriculum in recent years to reflect its position of a competitive and modern school.

== Co-curricular activities ==
The college offers several pathways for co-curricular activities including music, drama, art, theatre, sports and leisure, leadership, life skills, careers and work experience, social service, personal welfare and other interest groups. Year 9 students will have the opportunity to be selected to attend the school for Student Leadership, along with the opportunity to travel to China or Italy, as a cultural exchange. For students in year 11 or 12, positions to travel to Estancia High School in Costa Mesa, California are available, where students will stay with American hosts for the duration of their stay.
