= Grange P-12 College =

Coordinates: 37°51′33″S 144°40′32″E

The Grange P–12 College
- Hoppers Crossing, Victoria; Australia

Information
- Type: Government co-educational, prep – Year 12
- Motto: Respect, Learning, Working Together
- Established: 1993
- Principal: David Smillie
- Enrolment: 1927
- Campus: Deloraine and Callistemon
- Houses: Armstrong Baker Chirnside Cowie
- Website: https://www.thegrange.vic.edu.au/

The Grange P–12 College is a Prep to Year 12 government school located in the outer western suburb of Hoppers Crossing, Melbourne, Australia.

The Grange P–12 College has a student population of 1927, offering a curriculum for years P–12 split over two campuses, Callistemon (P–6) and Deloraine (7–12). Both the Victorian Certificate of Education (VCE) and the Victorian Certificate of Applied Learning (VCAL) programmes are offered to students in years 11 and 12. The Secondary campus (Deloraine) is split into three subsections, Middle School (Years 7 and 8), Senior Years (Years 9 and 10) and Later Years (Years 11 and 12), although all 3 sections are integrated into the one campus.

Located in the City of Wyndham, approximately 30 minutes drive south west of the Melbourne CBD, The Grange College was initially opened as a secondary school in 1993. In 1998 the addition of facilities for the primary years P–6 on a nearby site saw the college re-structure to form a multi campus P–12 College.

The City of Wyndham is said to be the fastest growing community in Victoria with a population of approximately 143,000, having increased by 50+% in the last ten years. With an annual growth rate of 7.2%, it is expected that the population will nearly double again by 2026. It is a multicultural community with 25% of residents born overseas and 18% from a non-English speaking background. Local employment opportunities are diverse and include high tech industry, retail, intensive horticulture, and some major tourist attractions.

As a consequence, overall enrolment has trended up over the last decade. Whilst enrolment at Year 7 fell away from the very high initial levels it did trend up again until 2006. However, enrolment has fluctuated from this point including a sharp drop again in 2007. At Prep level, enrolment trended up until 2005 but declined steadily from this point. Current enrolment is 1176 in Years 7–12, and 751 in Years P–6, a total of 1927 students. With the ongoing growth in new housing estates in the surrounding area, and the steady supply of rental accommodation in the neighbourhood, the enrolment projection for the college is steady.

The college is culturally diverse with 22% of families having a language background other than English (LOTE), and approximately 31% of students coming from a home where a language other than English is spoken. Over recent years there has been a change in ethnic makeup of the college community with the main ethnic groups now represented coming from the Pacific Islands, India and the Horn of Africa. The college provides a program for 53 disabled students with additional funding provided through the Program for Students with a Disability (PSD). To support these students in the classroom the college employs 18 Integration Aides (11.48 EFT).

The college also has strong representation from the Koorie community with 35 Koorie students enrolled in the college.

The primary campus is organised into 34 classes. The P–2 class sizes average 23 students, whilst the Years 3–6 classes average 26–27 students. The college provides a broad curriculum based on the Victorian Curriculum with specialist teachers for STEM, Visual Arts, Physical Education and Hindi (LOTE).

The secondary campus is divided into three sub-schools, the Middle Years (7/8), Senior Years (9/10) and Later Years 11/12). The college generally aims for class sizes of 25 students although at the VCE level a few small classes are supported in order to maintain breadth in the Later Years curriculum. The college operates a thirty period week. The facilities on the primary campus, which were built in 1997, include 18 permanent classrooms and 12 relocatables. Specialist facilities include an Art/ Dance classroom, ICT laboratory, Library, hall/gymnasium and canteen. The surrounding grounds feature adventure play equipment, a basketball court, and a grassed oval. The college has developed plans for further improvement and this will provide a new gymnasium and artificial turf covering for some play areas.

Improvements achieved in previous years at the secondary campus include the new VCE study centre, vocational studies facilities for hairdressing and hospitality, and an industrial kitchen. The college has also been successful in securing funding through the Leading Schools Fund and this has resulted in a high-quality learning centre for Years 7/8. Currently the college is developing a master plan for a major facilities upgrade for the secondary campus, to bring the learning environment for all year levels in line with the Year 7/8 centre, to promote best teaching and learning practice across the whole campus. The master plan has been given high priority by the college.

In 2019 the college launched the Sports Science Academy (SSA), for select students from Years 5–12. This was later expanded to include select Year 4 students. In 2025 the STEM Academy had been implemented, for select students from Years 6, 7 and 9. This later included select Year 5, 8 and 10 students a year later, with plans to extend it further to Years 11 and 12.

== Early history of the college ==
The Grange P–12 College began life as The Grange Secondary College in 1993, initially with an intake of 140 Year 7 students and 20 staff. The college was set up using an innovative organisation model called Team Small Group, where between two and three classes of students are kept together during Years 7, 8 and 9 (the so-called "middle years" of schooling ), and work with a stable small group of staff. The underlying premise was that the best learning environment is one where teachers and students know each other well, and there is an emphasis on the emotional and social learning of students as well as the academic learning. The socialisation of students is a key concept, with cooperation and overcoming interpersonal difficulties considered a key goal.

The organisational model Team Small Group was ahead of the current interest in the middle years but was an attempt to address the same set of problems: namely to provide stability, a sense of belonging and offset a sense of disengagement experienced by some students during their middle years of schooling. The Team Small Group innovation was premised on the notion that adolescence is a complex social/emotional developmental stage which needs to be recognised and addressed by educators.

The starting point of The Grange experience of Team Small Group was its depiction in literature and at ‘in-services’ run by Anne Ratzki Ratzki, (a German educator) attended by several key figures in the formation of The Grange in 1992, including foundation Principal Karen Moore. Other key concepts came out of literature associated with Ted Sizer and the Coalition of Essential Schools coming from the United States.

The Team Small Group model was developed in Germany in the early 1970s as a reaction against an education system that practiced predominant streaming of students. The streaming experiment in Germany was said to be producing negative effects, particularly on socialisation processes and student's social learning. Team Small Group was an attempt to eliminate competition and enforce cooperation where weaker students would be helped by stronger students and all members of the community would learn to overcome differences and live together harmoniously.

To achieve these ends, organisationally it is characterised by a stable group of adolescents in the form of table group (about five students placed in a mixed ability grouping, chosen by staff and expected to operate as a unit for extended periods of time) Three classes of students are kept together with a small group of staff operating as a small school within a school with a high degree of autonomy. Power is decentralised in the school down to the team level. The basic unit of work in the classroom is not the teacher but the work going on between students in these table groups. The exchange of ideas within the table group facilitates cognitive learning processes and "liberates from personal perception and spontaneous opinions from the egocentric perspective."

Team Small Group was introduced from the very beginning of The Grange's establishment and survived as an organisational model with relative stability for a number of years, however by the time George Perini (College Principal 1999–2006) and Angelique den Brinker (College Principal 2006–2014) were appointed, more traditional school structures were introduced, in response to changing area demographics, student opinion data, analysis of test results and emerging educational trends

== Media appearances ==
The school was used to film Chris Lilley's Jonah from Tonga. It was filmed as the fictitious Holy Cross High School in a lower socioeconomic area in the outer western suburbs of Sydney, New South Wales, Australia.
