= Skeleton Creek Trail =

Trail adjacent to Skeleton Creek, Melbourne, Victoria, Australia

- Length: About 7.5km
- Location: Melbourne, Victoria, Australia
- Difficulty: Easy
- Hazards: Path quality can be poor
- Hills: None
- Trains: Aircraft and Laverton stations
- Tram: None

The Skeleton Creek Trail is a shared use path for cyclists and pedestrians, which follows Skeleton Creek as it passes through the outer south western suburbs of Point Cook and Altona Meadows in Melbourne, Victoria, Australia.

The northern end of the path comes within 800 metres of the Federation Trail. As of 2010 the intervening Princes Highway eliminates any possibility of traversing between these two points. Neither council, state government, federal government or VicRoads have expressed any interest in joining the track due to the local seats being non strategic.

As of 2010 a new footbridge at the southern end of Skeleton Creek, extends the Hobsons Bay Coastal Trail to the far side of Skeleton Creek at Sunflower Walk. This trail will eventually continue to the Point Cook Coastal park and homestead maintained by Parks Victoria as development at Sanctuary Lakes Resort continues. As of 2010 access to Point Cook Road via the south side of Sanctuary Lakes is not possible due to construction works in progress. Access to the path on the west side heading up stream is via Sunflower Walk, Sanctuary Lakes Estates Boulevard and Bayside Drive.

== Following the Path ==
=== Upper section ===
The upper section starts just north of Sayers Road. Further south is a footbridge across the creek leading to the "Flagmans Welcome". Stay on the west side. About 3 km from Sayers Road the path meets the Federation Trail.

=== Lower section ===
The lower section starts about 700 m south of the Federation Trail on the south side of the creek but does not connect to the Federation Trail due to the intervening Princes Freeway.

There is a path on both sides of the creek. There are two footbridges: one halfway along the trail and the other near the mouth of the creek at the start of the Cheetham Wetlands adjacent to the old ford. This footbridge, completed in Dec 2009, links directly to the Hobsons Bay Coastal Trail.

== Connections ==
Upper section: Dead end near Sayers Road. Connects to the Federation Trail at the southern end.

Lower section:

- Dead end in the north at McIntyre Street, with access to Federation Trail via road: Dunnings Road, Hacketts Road then Sneydes Road/Hoppers Lane. Sneydes Road/Hoppers Lane has an overpass over Princes Highway. The road is busy and requires caution.
- A secondary path at the middle footbridge leads to Bruce Comben Reserve, allowing access to a footbridge over the Princes Highway, connecting to Laverton Station.
- The trail connects to the Hobsons Bay Coastal Trail in the south.

Lower: West end at 37.880010°S 144.727161°E. East end at 37.896534°S 144.781834°E.

== See also ==
- Skeleton Creek, Melbourne
