= Hoppers Crossing =

- Suburb
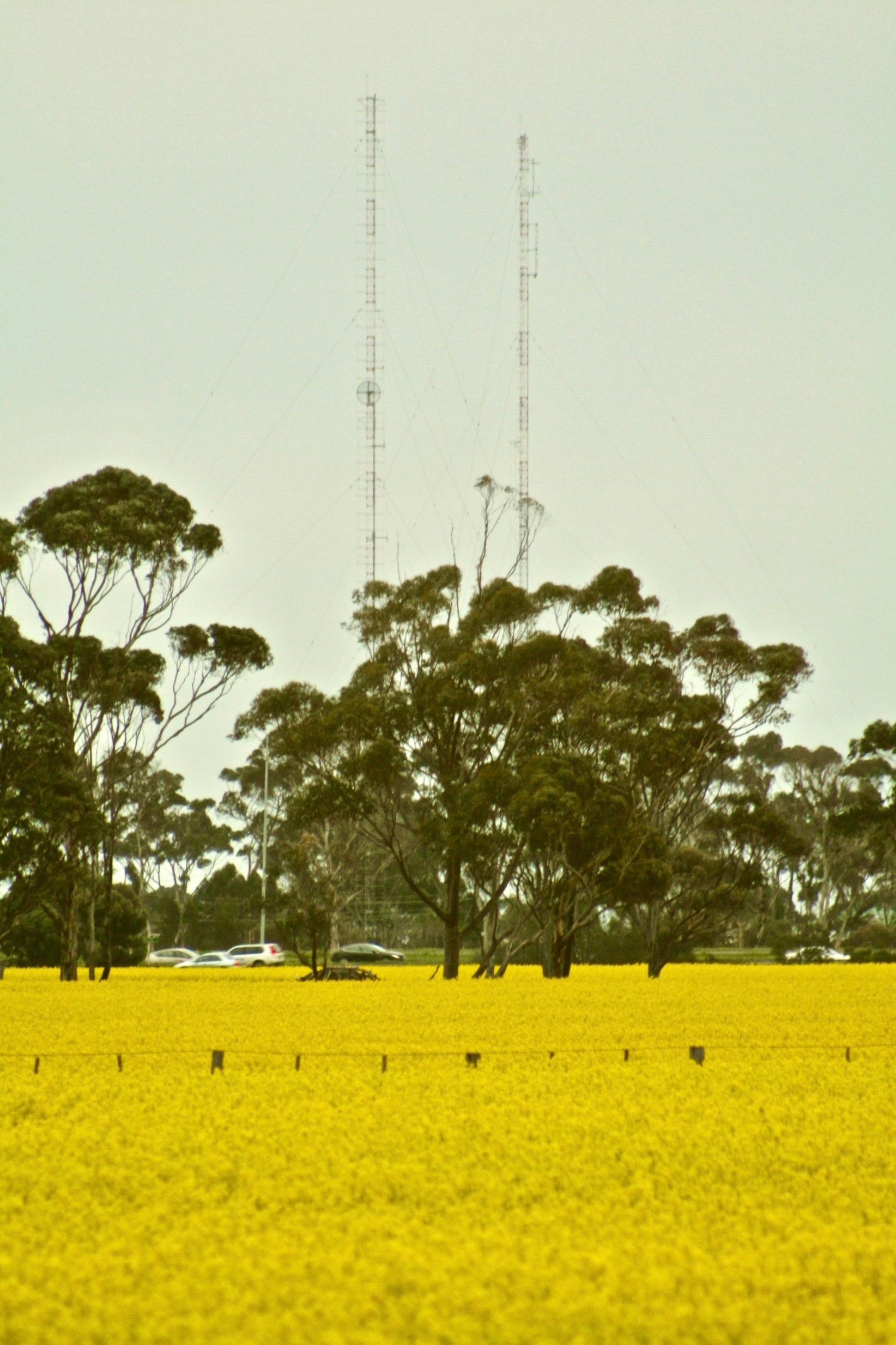
- Canola fields and radio towers in Hoppers Crossing

- Coordinates: 37.869°S 144.693°E
- Country: Australia
- State: Victoria
- City: Melbourne
- LGA: City of Wyndham
- Location: 23.1 km (14.4 mi) from Melbourne; 4.61 km (2.86 mi) from Werribee; 48 km (30 mi) from Geelong

Government
  - State electorates: Tarneit; Werribee
  - Federal division: Lalor

Area
  - Total: 17.63 km^{2} (6.81 sq mi)
- Elevation: 27 m (89 ft)

Population
  - Total: 37,216 (2021 census)
  - Density: 2,110.9/km^{2} (5,467.3/sq mi)
- Postcode: 3029
Suburbs around Hoppers Crossing
Tarneit	Tarneit	Truganina
Werribee	Hoppers Crossing	Williams Landing
Werribee	Werribee	Point Cook

Hoppers Crossing is a suburb in Melbourne, Victoria, Australia, 24 km (15 mi) south-west of Melbourne's central business district, located within the City of Wyndham local government area. Hoppers Crossing recorded a population of 37,216 at the 2021 census.

Located on the urban fringe, from the Princes Highway to the growing suburbs of Tarneit and Truganina, Hoppers Crossing stretches northwards.

== History ==
Hoppers Crossing is a suburb in the Wyndham area, an area rich and diverse in its Aboriginal history which was inhabited by the Boonwurrung and Wathaurong People who belong to the Kulin nation. There are five different language groups in the Kulin Nation that are particular to this region.

These groups operated within their own tribal boundaries. However, with the shifting of natural boundaries over the years and the growth of Australia's population, the old tribal boundaries are not so widely known. The collective traditional territory for the tribes of the Kulin Nation extends around Port Phillip and Western Port, up into the Great Dividing Range and the Loddon and Goulburn River valleys. The clan Kurang-jang-balluk lived east of Werribee River and up to Kororoit Creek. Their name refers to red earth, the colour of the volcanic plains of Iramoo. After the first disruption of British colonisation, the remaining members of the Woiwurrung joined other Kulin language groups at Coranderrk in 1864. This broke cultural protocols that had been tended for many generations. The clan was forcibly displaced again in 1924. In the wider district, there are places named after Aboriginal people or animals. Truganina, for Palawa woman Truganini. Mambourin, a Barrabool man. Balliang (bat), Cocoroc (frog), Parwan (magpie).

The locality of Hoppers Crossing was named after Elizabeth Hopper, who was a gatekeeper of the level crossing over the railway line now called the Werribee line. Her duty was to close and re-open a set of large wooden level crossing gates whenever a train passed through. She and her husband, Stephen Hopper (1832–1908), a railway ganger for 33 years, lived nearby with their eleven children. Stephen Hopper was also a labourer, who had arrived in Victoria in 1856 from a village in Dover, England. He was then in his early 20s and presumably came for the gold. The name was in common usage by 1910.

Other names in Hoppers Crossing also point to settler history. The roads Heaths, Hogans and Morris are named after farming families. Baden and Powell Drives are named for HL Baden Powell, an ex-shearer who subdivided land for housing in the 1960s. He was a fan of the Richmond Football Club, so many of the streets in this estate are named after players, including Jack Dyer, Frank Hughes and Kevin Bartlett. Until the early 1960s, the locality was mainly open farmland and the only notable feature of Hoppers Crossing was Frank Kopacka's general store. In 1963, the first subdivision of residential land took place by former shearer Harold Llewellyn Baden Powell. However, basic infrastructure such as telephones, sewerage and even kerb-side post boxes was only built more than five years later after lobbying from the Hoppers Crossing Ratepayers Association.

Hoppers Crossing grew rapidly from the 1970s. The suburb's first primary school, Mossfiel Primary School, had its initial student intake in 1970, the year of opening of the railway station. The first shopping centre, Woodville Park, was built soon afterwards, and the post office opened in 1975.

In the late 1980s, Werribee Plaza first opened its doors. Between 2000 and 2006, it underwent many important redesigns and extensions.

== Population ==
In the 2016 census, there were 38,701 people in Hoppers Crossing. 58.8% of people were born in Australia. The next most common countries of birth were India 5.9%, New Zealand 2.7%, Philippines 2.6%, England 2.2% and Myanmar 1.8%. 60.5% of people spoke only English at home. Other languages spoken at home included Arabic 2.6%, Punjabi 2.0%, Italian 1.9%, Mandarin 1.7% and Hindi 1.6%. The most common responses for religion were Roman Catholic 27.4%, No Religion 22.4% and Anglican 8.1%.

== Retail ==
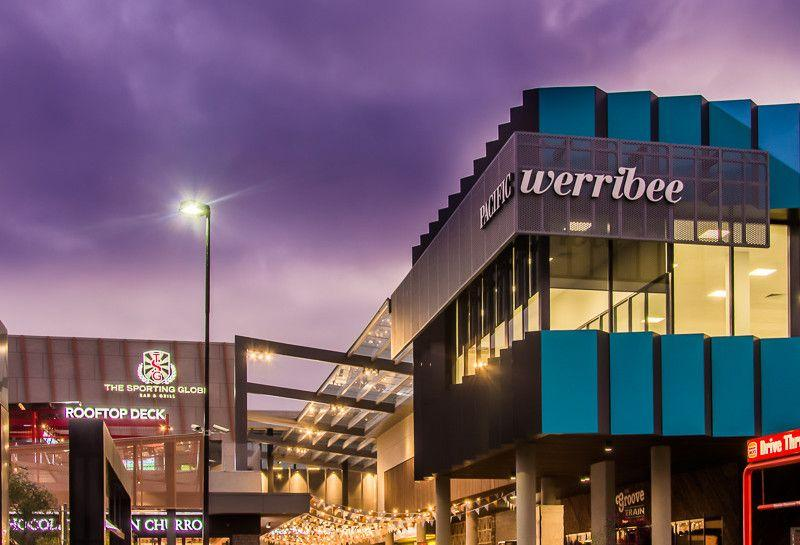
Pacific Werribee shopping centre in Hoppers Crossing

- Hoppers Crossing Shopping Centre opened in 1983. Following a $10m major redevelopment in 2016, the centre has expanded to include a range of speciality retail and food outlets.
- Pacific Werribee opened in 1985, originally categorised as a regional shopping centre. The centre has since undergone seven stages of major expansion and redevelopment since 2000. The current complex design was completed in 2017, and the shopping centre was rebranded as Pacific Werribee. It now includes major local retailers, around 300 speciality stores, and major supermarket chains.
- Hogans Corner opened in 1997–1998. It includes supermarket, and several specialty stores and fast-food restaurants.
- Old Geelong Road is a commercial precinct running over several kilometres. The precinct contains a large variety of big box homemaker and warehouse retailers.

== Parks ==
There several parks including playgrounds and recreational areas generally 2-4 blocks of land in residential streets. Recreation reserves mostly exist along what once was a river or stream, although now serve as drainage reserves and the local Skeleton Creek (Snakes are common near Skeleton Creek).

== Fauna and flora ==
Skeleton Creek, which runs along the suburb's eastern edge, has healthy populations of native reptiles, including:

- Tiger snake
- Eastern blue-tongued lizard
- Eastern brown snake
- Striped skink
- Stump-tailed skink

== Education ==
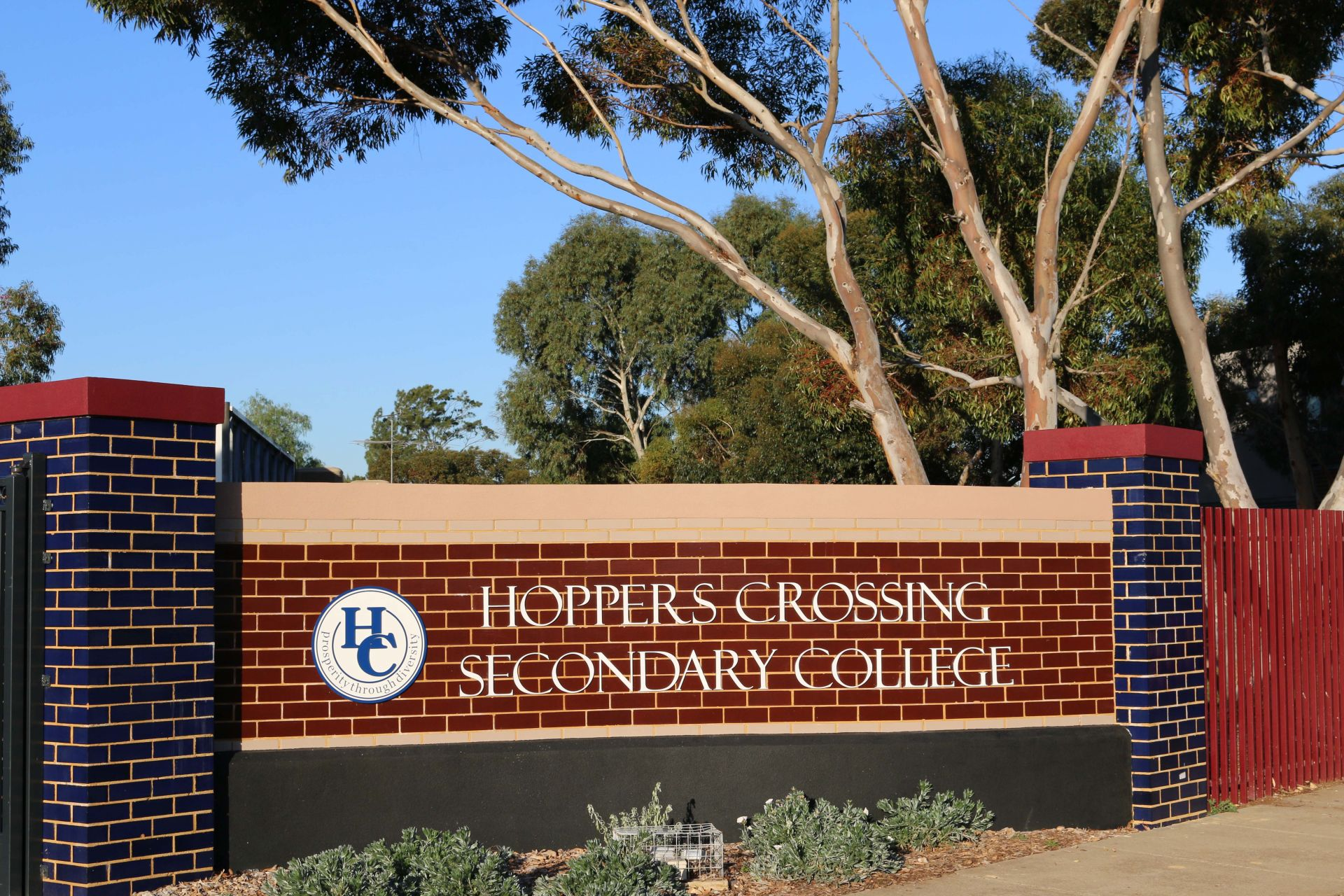
Hoppers Crossing Secondary College

=== State schools and colleges ===
Primary schools

- Bellbridge Primary School
- Baden Powell College, formerly Derrimut Heath Primary School

– Derrimut Heath Campus

- The Grange P-12 College

– Primary Campus

- Mossfiel Primary School
- Woodville Primary School
- Cambridge Primary School

Secondary colleges

- Hoppers Crossing Secondary College
- The Grange P-12 College

– Secondary Campus

=== Roman Catholic schools and colleges ===
Primary Schools

- St Peter Apostle Primary School
- St James the Apostle Primary School

=== Specialist schools ===
- Warringa Park School

In 2006 the principal of Derrimut Heath Primary School (Now Baden Powell College), Julie Mason, was chosen as the "Wyndham Citizen of the Year" for her key role in the development of the Wyndham Community Education Plan 2004-2007 and serving as chair of the Quality Community Plan Education Committee.

== Transport ==
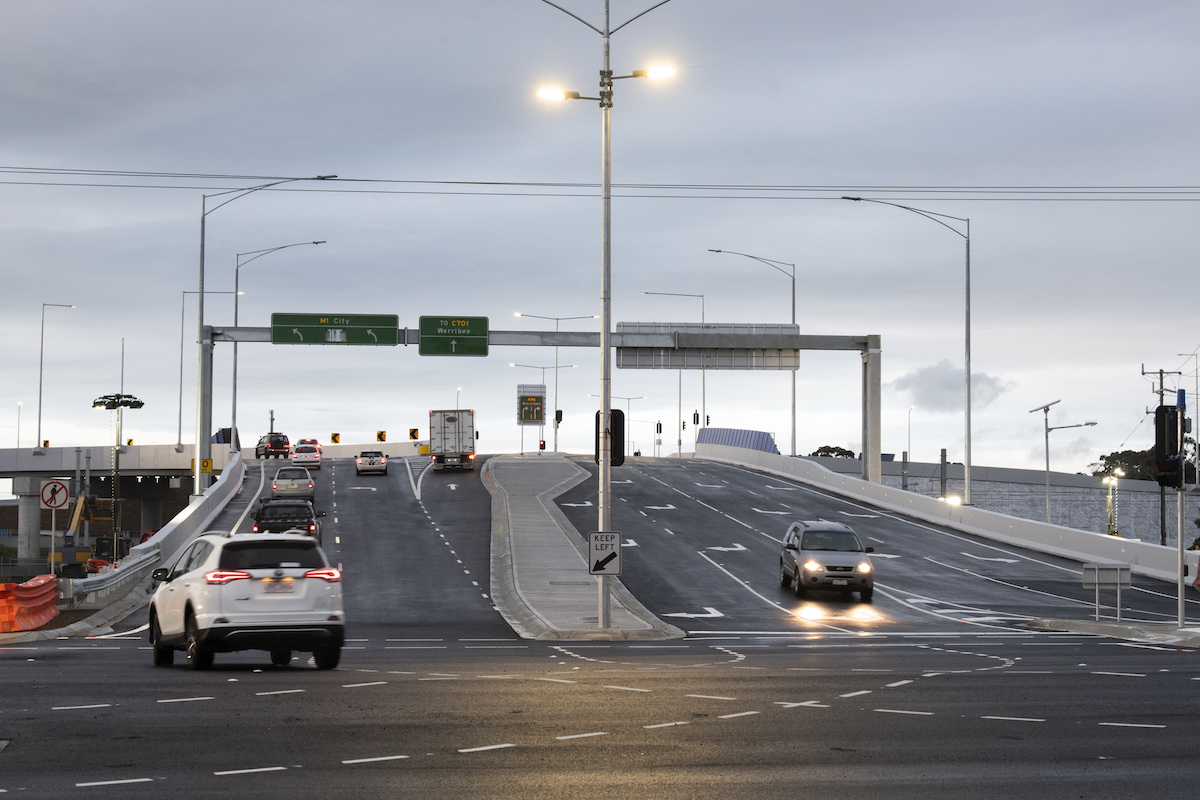
A new road bridge over the railway line, connecting the Princes Freeway and the Old Geelong Road at Hoppers Crossing, was opened in 2021

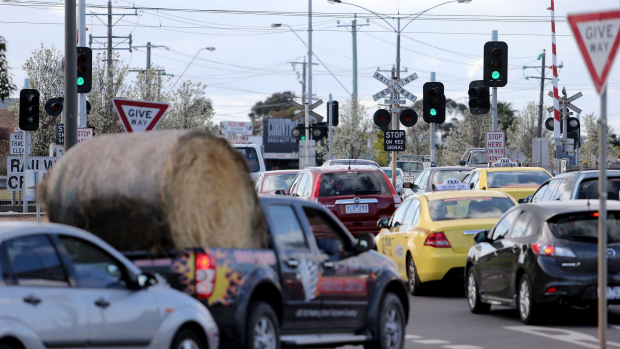
The previous level crossing at the station was a major cause of congestion

=== Rail ===
Hoppers Crossing is served by the Hoppers Crossing railway station, to the south of the suburb, on the Werribee line, where the line is crossed by the Old Geelong Road. In the 19th century, railway workers on the line knew the place as Hopper's Hill, referring to the steep gradient from Skeleton Creek where goods locomotive drivers often had to split their train into two sections to make the grade. When opened in 1970, the station was on the western side of the Old Geelong Road level crossing on the Port Fairy line, served by only a few diesel-hauled trains each day. In 1983, the station was relocated to the eastern side of the level crossing, in conjunction with electrification of the line. The Regional Rail Link opened in 2015, which provided new track from West Werribee through Tarneit to Deer Park and included a new railway station at Tarneit. This connected the Serviceton and Port Fairy railway lines and redirected Geelong V/Line trains away from the Port Fairy line and Hoppers Crossing.

In November 2018, the Victorian Government announced that the level crossing at Old Geelong Road would be removed by closing the existing road and constructing a new road bridge east of the station. The station and precinct would also be rebuilt. The road bridge was opened in December 2021 and the remainder of the project is scheduled for completion in 2022.

In the mid-2000s a tramway was proposed for the Hoppers Crossing – Werribee area to replace bus services, but the idea was not seen as feasible by the Wyndham City Council and Victorian State Government.

=== Bus ===
Bus services in Hoppers Crossing connect surrounding areas to Hoppers Crossing station, Werribee Plaza, and Werribee. Bus services have been extended as surrounding areas expand.

=== Road ===
Major roads include the Princes Highway (C109), Heaths Road (C701), Derrimut Road (C702), Hogans Road, Morris Road, Tarneit Road and Sayers Road.

== Sports ==
Hoppers Crossing has many gyms and sports grounds. There are facilities for tennis, soccer, Australian rules football, basketball, netball, lawn bowls and more. In 2004, the Federation Trail was opened, which links Werribee with Brooklyn, and soon Yarraville.

A new soccer complex was built at The Grange for the Hoppers Crossing Soccer Club. They previously played at Mossfiel Reserve, which is now a rugby football field. Founded in 1971, the 'Reds' have won 5 senior championships (1999, 2001, 2012, 2014 and 2015) and will compete in the Football Federation Victoria State League 2 Nth/West division in 2017. One of the most popular clubs in the region, Hoppers Crossing SC currently field 20 teams across junior, senior and masters age groups.

The Hoppers Crossing Football Club, nicknamed the 'Warriors', play at Hogans Road Reserve. They currently compete in the Western Region Football League first division, where they won senior premierships in 2002 and 2004. The Warriors are one of the biggest clubs in the league, boasting numerous junior sides as well seniors and reserves.

Hoppers Crossing Cricket Club, known as the 'Cats' was formed in 1977 and its first team was entered into the "B turf" section of the Sunshine Cricket Association in season 1977/78. The result in the club's first season was runners-up. Later England player Stuart Broad played for the Hopppers Crossing Cricket Club as a young player

Hoppers Crossing is the home of Australian Olympic Gold Medalist Russell Mark and his wife Lauryn, a triple Commonwealth Games Gold Medalist.
