= Truganina =

- Suburb
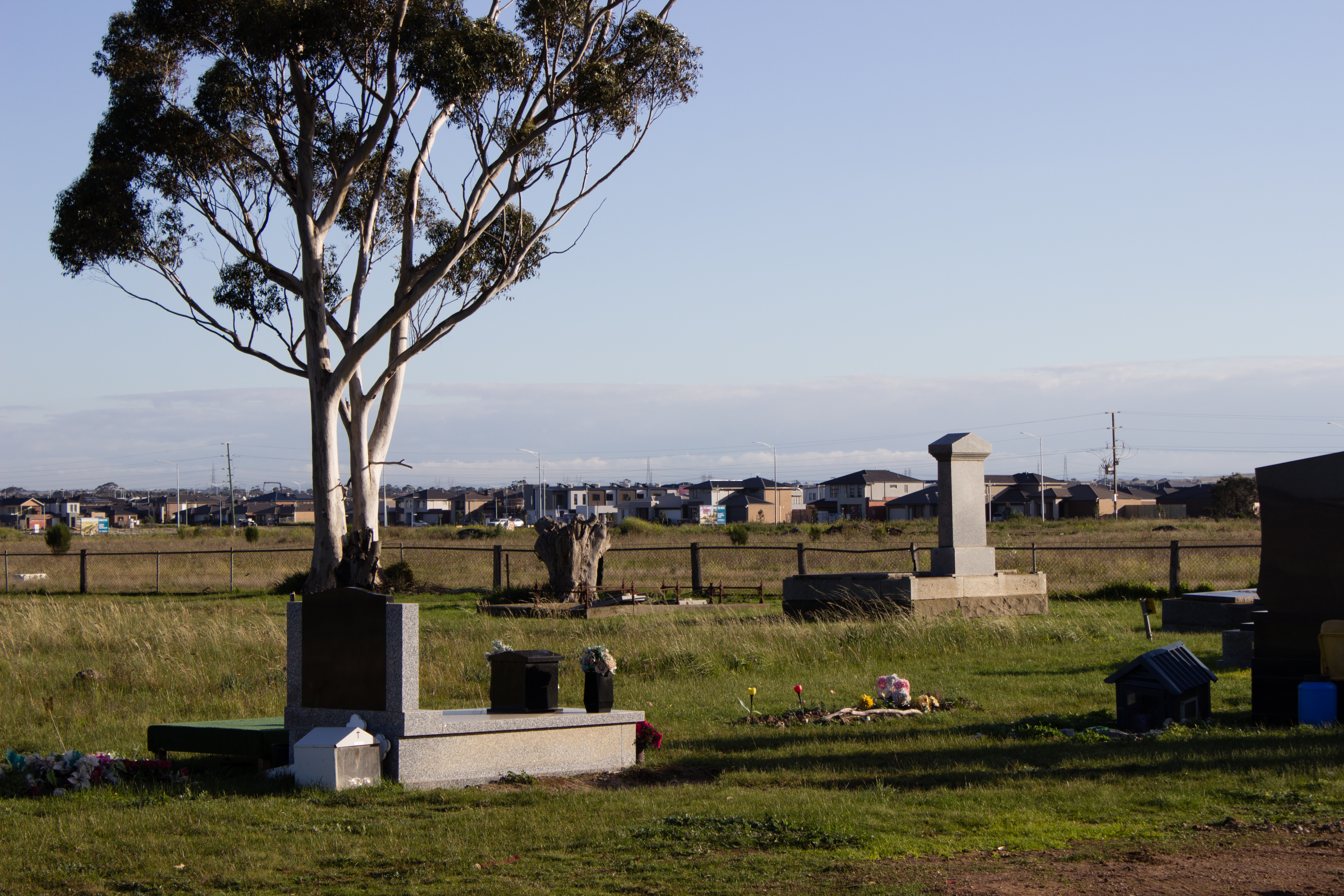
- Truganina Cemetery

- Interactive map of Truganina
- Coordinates: 37.817°S 144.750°E
- Country: Australia
- State: Victoria
- City: Melbourne
- LGAs: City of Melton; City of Wyndham
- Location: 22 km (14 mi) from Melbourne; 50 km (31 mi) from Geelong

Government
  - State electorates: Kororoit; Laverton
  - Federal divisions: Gorton; Gellibrand

Area
  - Total: 56 km^{2} (22 sq mi)
- Elevation: 39 m (128 ft)

Population
  - Total: 36,305 (2021 census)
  - Density: 648/km^{2} (1,679/sq mi)
- Postcode: 3029
Suburbs around Truganina
Mount Atkinson; Tarneit Plains	Deanside	Ravenhall
Mount Cottrell; Tarneit	Truganina	Derrimut; Laverton North
Tarneit	Hoppers Crossing	Williams Landing

Truganina (/trʌɡəˈnaɪnə/ TRUG-ə-NY-nə) is a suburb in Melbourne, Victoria, Australia, 22.4 km (13.9 mi) west of Melbourne's Central Business District, located within the Cities of Melton and Wyndham local government areas. Truganina recorded a population of 36,305 at the 2021 census.

The suburb is believed to be named after Truganini, who is generally accepted as the last surviving Aboriginal Tasmanian, as she had visited the area for a short time.

Truganina is a rapidly growing suburban area, recording a population of 20,687 at the 2016 census. The southern portion within the City of Wyndham, referred to by locals as "old" Truganina, is bordered roughly by Skeleton Creek to the west and the Federation Trail to the south. The northern portion within the City of Melton encompasses the Mount Atkinson estate and surrounding rural areas.

Truganina is an industrial precincts of the City of Wyndham, mainly for manufacturing and logistics.

== History ==
Truganina Post Office opened on 12 June 1878, closed in 1895, reopened in 1902 and closed again in 1942. The nearby Tarneit Post Office opened in 2008 to serve the area.

In 1969 bushfires claimed about 60 houses in the area.

== Name pronunciation ==
The pronunciation of Truganina has two common points of dispute. The first is the vowel used in the initial syllable "Trug", and the second is the vowel used in the third syllable "ni". Because the suburb is believed to be named after the indigenous Tasmanian woman, Truganini, the pronunciation of Truganina can be elucidated by the phonology of her name in her native tongue.

In the Bruny Island Tasmanian language (Nuennonne), Truganina was the name of the grey saltbush, Atriplex cinerea. According to the pronunciation of the language around Oyster Bay, the region where Truganini was born, her name would have been pronounced as "Troo-ga-ni-ni" [ˈtrugaˌnini] with short vowels, rather than with an initial unrounded open-mid vowel in the initial position [trʌ]; or with the diphthong of "nai-nai" [nɑɪnɑɪ] in the third syllable. That would make the approximated Palawa pronunciation of "Truganina" as [ˈtrugaˌninə].

Taking that into account, "Troo-ga-nee-na" [ˈtrugəˌni:nə] is most likely the closest correct Anglicised pronunciation.

== Population growth ==
Truganina is expected to have a population of 39,951 by 2031, which would be an increase of 1,350.6%, or 28,633 persons from 2006.

- 2,958 (2006)
- 8,353 (2011 estimated)
- 17,469 (2014 abs)
- 20,687 (2016 census)
- 39,951 (2031 projected)

=== Urban sprawl ===
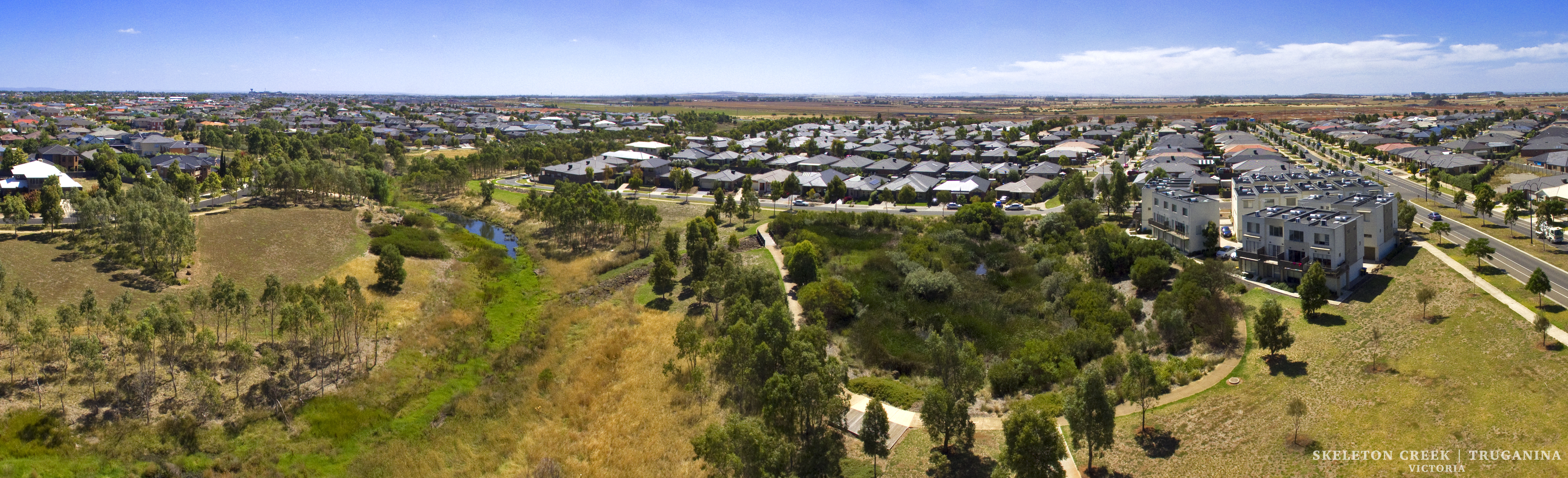
Aerial perspective of Skeleton Creek, Truganina

Truganina (and neighbouring Tarneit) is largely characterised by low density development and is growing rapidly in advance of transport infrastructure and services, meaning that the vast majority of new residents are currently dependent on automobiles. The growth is primarily due to affordable housing and the area's location within a growth corridor that is close to the major manufacturing areas in Laverton and the proposed business park on part of the RAAF Williams Base.

== Facilities ==
=== Telecommunications ===
People who live in developments with broadband hubs will have access to high speed DSL services, as local exchanges are too far away for effective DSL services. New houses being built are now being connected to National Broadband Network using the FTTP and FTTC technologies.

=== Transport ===
Truganina's road network is laid out in street hierarchy, with almost all residential streets feeding into a grid of main roads including busy east–west corridor Sayers Road, Leakes Road, Dohertys Road and Boundary Road, and north–south links Morris Road, Marquands Road, Woods Road and Palmers Road.

As part of the Regional Rail Link project, bridges were built over the railway line at two locations in Truganina; Dohertys and Boundary Road's. This enables commuters to keep using the road whilst the railway line functions underneath, effectively a grade separation.

The main public transport is the bus network, with most of the main routes runs via Forsyth and Sayers Roads. The bus runs through the Clearwater Rise residential estate and also Marquands Road.

Off-road cycling is facilitated by the Federation Trail at the southern border of the suburb, however few of the main roads provide provision for bicycles.

The nearest railway stations is Williams Landing which is 3.5 kilometres from the centre of Truganina. Laverton and Hoppers Crossing, both on the Werribee railway line are 5 kilometres from the centre of Truganina. Another similarly distant railway station, Tarneit, at the corner of Derrimut Road and Leakes Road in nearby Tarneit, opened recently as part of the Regional Rail Link project. This would provide V/Line diesel services on route between Geelong and Melbourne. There are plans for an additional Truganina railway station to eventually be added to the line to service Truganina.

Truganina Rabbitohs play rugby league in NRL Victoria.

=== Education ===
There are several schools in Truganina, including

- Westbourne Grammar School
- Al-Taqwa Islamic College
- Truganina South Primary School
- Truganina P-9 College
- St Clare's Roman Catholic Primary School
- Garrang Wilam Primary School
- Dohertys Creek P-9 College
- Bemin Secondary College
- Warreen Primary School

== Industry ==
Parts of Truganina have been planned as new areas for industrial zones. These planned areas lie northwards and eastwards of the new housing zones in southern Truganina.

=== Distribution centres ===
Many distribution centres are setting up in the Truganina area due to the easy access to rail, roads and air freight services. Currently Woolworths Group has a large liquor distribution centre that services BWS, Dan Murphy's and Woolworths supermarkets. Linfox also have a small logistics centre in the same complex, and to the north of the area K&S Freighters. In 2010 Kmart Australia started construction on a new purpose built distribution centre in Truganina. The Kmart Australia Distribution Centre is now the largest building by footprint size in Australia and the Southern Hemisphere and tenth largest in the world. Another mega distribution centre in the Truganina industrial area was built for Coles Supermarkets in 2012 which is approximately 70,000 square metres.
