= Westgate Punt =

Ferry services on the Yarra River

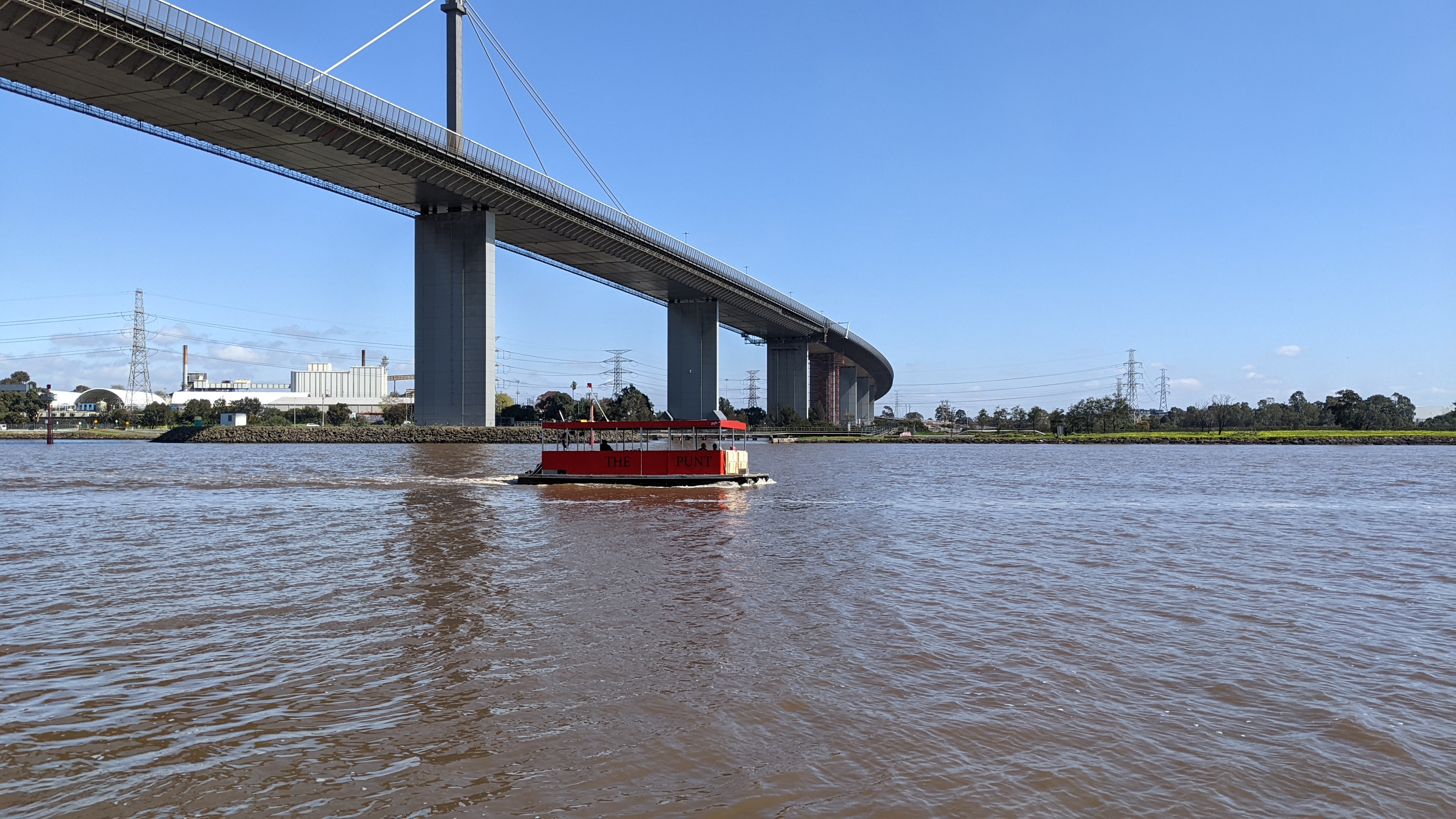
- Locale: Melbourne, Australia
- Waterway: Yarra River
- Transit type: Passenger ferry
- Operator: Rob Horner
- Began operation: 1993
- System length: 2 wharves, 0.5 kilometres (0.27 nmi)
- No. of vessels: 1
- Daily ridership: 100 passengers per day
- Website: westgatepunt.com

The Westgate Punt is a passenger ferry service in Melbourne, Victoria, Australia. It operates on the Yarra River, connecting the suburbs of Spotswood and Port Melbourne with a journey of 0.5 kilometres (0.27 nmi). The ferry service is operated by Rob Horner, however subsidised and overseen by Public Transport Victoria. It is the only commuter ferry service operating within metropolitan Melbourne.

== History ==
The Westgate Punt started in 1993 and was initially conceived as a way to help unemployed youth get a start in the maritime industry. The punt was originally privately operated, where services were unreliable for weekday commuter services and were not operated during poor weather or winter months. It primarily served recreational users during weekends and public holidays. Along with the high fare price, patronage rates were very low.

Due to low usage, weekday services were cancelled in 2006. In October 2011, weekday services were resumed after the Napthine government committed $1.4 million over four years to the punt service. It provided an alternative to driving over the West Gate Bridge for cyclists as it was the only connection between the city and the western suburbs south of Footscray Road, which led to a 43% increase in average daily patronage.

In 2016, subsidies were continued by the government along with a new vessel that is able to carry 20 passengers with bikes, up from 12 previously. In 2022, the Andrews government invested $200 thousand to maintain the low fare as a part of the government's goal to improve the cycling and walking network of Victoria. In June 2023, the ferry service acted as a replacement service during a two-week closure of roads and train lines due to West Gate Tunnel works.

== Service ==
Interactive map showing the route of the Westgate Punt and its wharfs

The ferry operates back and forth between Spotswood Jetty and Westgate Landing across the Yarra River, with a journey time of approximately 5 minutes. One vessel is used to operate all services.

On weekdays, the ferry only operates during the morning and afternoon peak in a 20-minute frequency at each wharf. On weekends, an on-demand service is provided from 9:00 am to 5:00 pm. Myki is not available on the service due to its privately owned nature, where only EFTPOS payments are accepted.

=== Spotswood Jetty ===
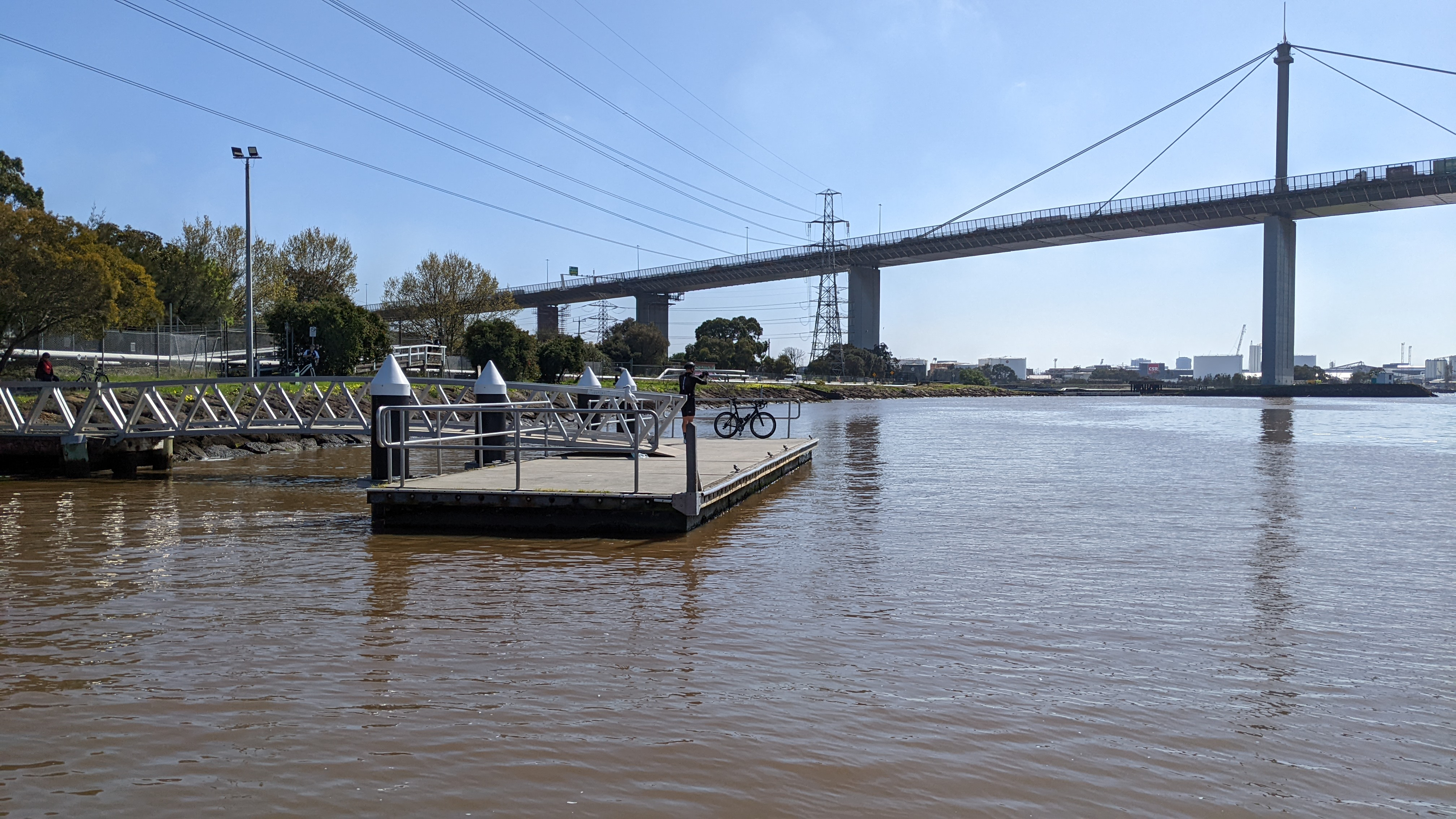
Spotswood Jetty for the Westgate Punt, Melbourne

The Spotswood Jetty is located on Douglas Parade, near the corner of Craig Street in the suburb of Spotswood, and is a short walk from Spotswood Station and the nearby Scienceworks. On weekdays, services are available from 6:30 am to 9:10 am, and from 3:50 to 6:50 pm.

=== Westgate Landing ===
Westgate Landing is located on Lorimer Street, near the corner of Sardine Street in Fishermans Bend, Port Melbourne. It is connected by bus route 237 which stops nearby on Lorimer Street and runs into the city. On weekdays, services are available from 6:40 am to 9:00 am, and from 3:40 to 7:00 pm.
