= Tarneit =

- Suburb
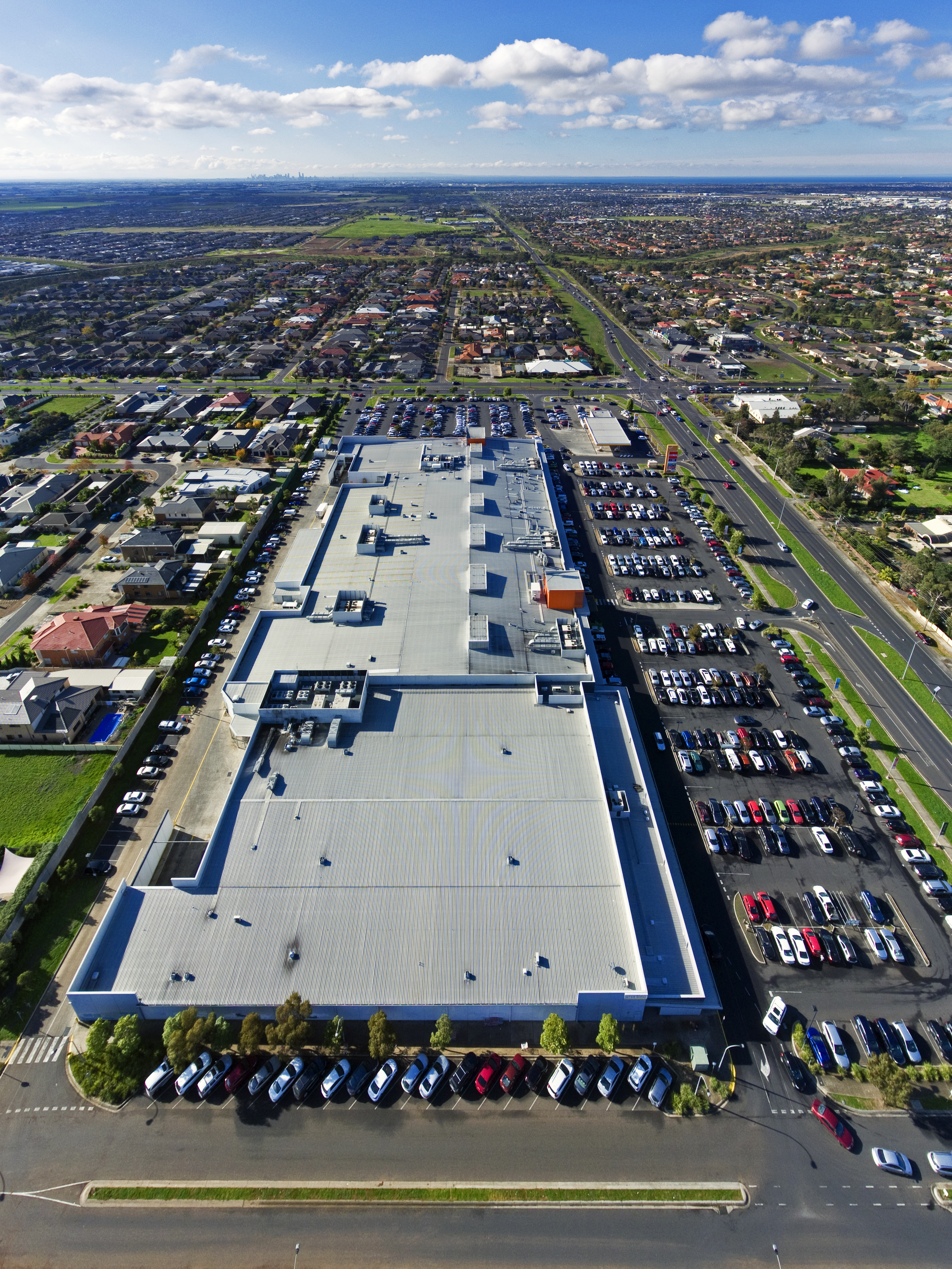
- Aerial panorama of Wyndham Village Shopping Centre in Tarneit

- Interactive map of Tarneit
- Coordinates: 37.833°S 144.672°E
- Country: Australia
- State: Victoria
- City: Melbourne
- LGA: City of Wyndham
- Location: 25 km (16 mi) from Melbourne; 7 km (4.3 mi) from Werribee; 50 km (31 mi) from Geelong

Government
  - State electorate: Tarneit
  - Federal division: Lalor

Area
  - Total: 38.17 km^{2} (14.74 sq mi)
- Elevation: 51 m (167 ft)

Population
  - Total: 56,370 (2021 census)
  - Density: 1,476.8/km^{2} (3,824.9/sq mi)
- Postcode: 3029
Suburbs around Tarneit
Mount Cottrell	Truganina	Truganina
Wyndham Vale	Tarneit	Truganina
Wyndham Vale	Werribee	Hoppers Crossing

Tarneit (/ˈtɑːnit/) is a suburb in Melbourne, Victoria, Australia, 25 km (16 mi) west of Melbourne's Central Business District, located within the City of Wyndham local government area. Tarneit recorded a population of 56,370 at the 2021 census.

Located near another emerging suburb, Truganina, Tarneit is estimated to increase to a population of over 63,000 by 2031.

== History ==
The Boonwurrung people of the Kulin nation were the first inhabitants of the area now known as Tarneit.

European settlement of the area dates to the 1830s, when Tarneit was used as agricultural grazing land. Tarneit was named when it was surveyed in 1839–1840 and comes from the Wathaurong word for the colour white.

Tarneit remained rural and sparsely populated until large scale residential subdivision began in earnest in the early 2000s. The road network was largely planned in a square mile grid pattern and still forms the basis of the arterial road network today.

One of the few European cultural heritage sites in Tarneit is Doherty's House on Dohertys Road, built of bluestone in the 1870s. Although gutted by a 1969 fire, the walls and chimney remain standing. The Council plans to repair the building and turn it into a café.

== Land use ==
Tarneit has mostly been used as agricultural grazing land. However this landscape has been rapidly changing due to urban sprawl, especially in the southern part of Tarneit, including from nearby suburbs such as Hoppers Crossing, Truganina, Wyndham Vale and Werribee.

Tarneit has a number of schools established within its boundaries, including

- Baden Powell P-9 College
- Barayip Primary School
- Brinbeal Secondary College ( 7-9 )
- Davis Creek Primary School ( prep to 6 )
- Good News Lutheran College ( prep to 12 )
- The Islamic College of Melbourne
- Karwan Primary School ( prep-6]
- Nearnung Primary School
- St Francis of Assisi Roman Catholic Primary School
- St John the Apostle Roman Catholic Primary School
- St Teresa of Kolkata Roman Catholic Primary School
- Tarneit Rise Primary School ( prep to 6)
- Tarneit P-9 College
- Thomas Carr College (Roman Catholic Secondary School)
- Wimba Primary School

There has been much residential growth occur in the Thomas Carr District, with other schools and shopping centres planned for construction. Stage one of Tarneit Central Shopping Centre, on the south east corner of Derrimut and Leakes Roads, began construction in mid 2016, and was opened in October 2017. It includes Coles and Aldi supermarkets, Kmart, Harris Scarfe, and The Reject Shop.

Wyndham Village Shopping Centre, in the suburb's east, was completed in 2005 to serve the population in the immediate area, especially in the residential developments of Tarneit Gardens, The Rise (located on the highest point of the surrounding plains), Rose Grange and Seasons.

Tarneit Town Centre, to be developed during the 2020s, is expected to be located in the area loosely bounded by Derrimut Road to the west, Leakes Road to the south, Skeleton Creek to the east and Dry Creek to the north.

Tarneit and other neighbouring suburbs such as Truganina are expected to grow rapidly as access to land in the more established suburbs in the City of Wyndham suburbs diminishes.

== Housing estates ==
The Tarneit area is now the site of several new housing estates, including Marigold, Verdant Hill, The Grove, Newgate, Habitat on Davis Creek Estate, Seasons Estate, The Heartlands, The Reflections Estate, Moorookyle, Tarneit Gardens, Ecoville, The Rise, Manhattan Place, Claremont Park, The Reserve, Creekstone (formerly Rothwell), Riverdale Village, Westbrook, Haven, NewHaven, Sunrise and Rose Grange. Mooted estates include Evadene, located within the Claremont Park estate.

== Demographics ==
At the 2021 census, the suburb of Tarneit recorded a population of 56,370.

Age distribution
The median age in Tarneit is 30 years, lower than the national median of 38 years. Children under 15 years make up 29% of the population compared to the national average of 18.2%. Residents aged 65 and over account for only 4.1%, lower than the national average of 17.2%.
Ethnic diversity
37.5% of residents were born in Australia compared to the national average of 66.9%. The most common countries of birth for residents were India (28.8%), New Zealand (3.6%), Philippines (3.4%), Pakistan (2.5%) and Bangladesh (1.4%). Only 29.4% of residents spoke only English at home, lower than the national average of 72.0%. Other commonly spoken languages included Punjabi (15.9%), Hindi (6.3%), Urdu (5.1%), Gujurati (4.6%) and Telugu (3.4%).
Religion
The most common responses were Hinduism (21.1%), Islam (15.0%), Catholicism (14.2%) and Sikhism (13.6%); all of these, except for Catholicism, are higher than the national average. 12.6% of respondents had no religion.
Income
The median weekly household income was $2,103, compared to the national median of $1,746.
Housing
89.5%, of dwellings in Tarneit are separate houses (the national average is 72.3%). 0.3% of dwellings were flats or apartments.
Employment
55.8% of respondents worked full time, 30.5% worked part-time and 7.3% were unemployed.

== Transport ==
The Regional Rail Link opened in the area in 2015. It travels from West Werribee through Tarneit to Deer Park and includes the new railway station of Tarneit. The new station, built near the north east corner of Derrimut and Leakes Roads, provides a much faster service than the current Werribee railway line, which instead passes through Laverton and Newport. It has car parking with 1,000 spaces, ensuring Tarneit becomes a prime regional area for those who commute to the city on a regular basis. Regional Rail Link also re-directs Geelong V/Line trains from the Werribee line. Regional Rail Link opened on 21 June 2015, with Tarneit railway station coming under the metropolitan ticketing zone 2.

In 2010, the Wyndham Bus Network was extensively upgraded and now caters for commuters from Tarneit. It was upgraded again in 2015 upon the opening of the Regional Rail Link.

Leakes Road has recently undergone redevelopment and is now sealed from Fitzgerald Road to the Leakes Road overpass (passes above the Regional Rail Link) just beyond Davis Road and provides a link from the industrial areas of Altona North and Laverton North to Tarneit and Hoppers Crossing. It is planned to ease traffic congestion on Sayers Road, which services Hoppers Crossing commuters travelling to and from the city. During peak hour the road often attracts high amounts of traffic. Leakes Road has since been duplicated from Fitzgerald Road to Derrimut Road to help cater to this high amount of traffic growth.

As part of the Regional Rail Link many roads were upgraded in Tarneit. Bridges were built over the railway line at Leakes Road, Davis Road, Tarneit Road and near Tarneit railway station itself at Derrimut Road. Doing this will enable a link between the existing estates and new housing developments on the other side of the railway line in the least populated locations such as Leakes Road and Davis Road, and provided a grade separation for the commuters who already used roads such as Tarneit Road and Derrimut Road.

== Sport ==
In December 2018 Football Federation Australia announced Western United FC would join the A-League from the 2019–20 season. For their first two seasons, the club played at Kardinia Park in Geelong. From the 2023–24 season onwards, the club will play at the new Ironbark Fields to be located at Sayers Road, Tarneit. The stadium will be part of a precinct comprising a training complex and administrative headquarters.

== See also ==
- Electoral district of Tarneit
