= Federation Trail =

Pedestrian and cycle path in Melbourne, Australia

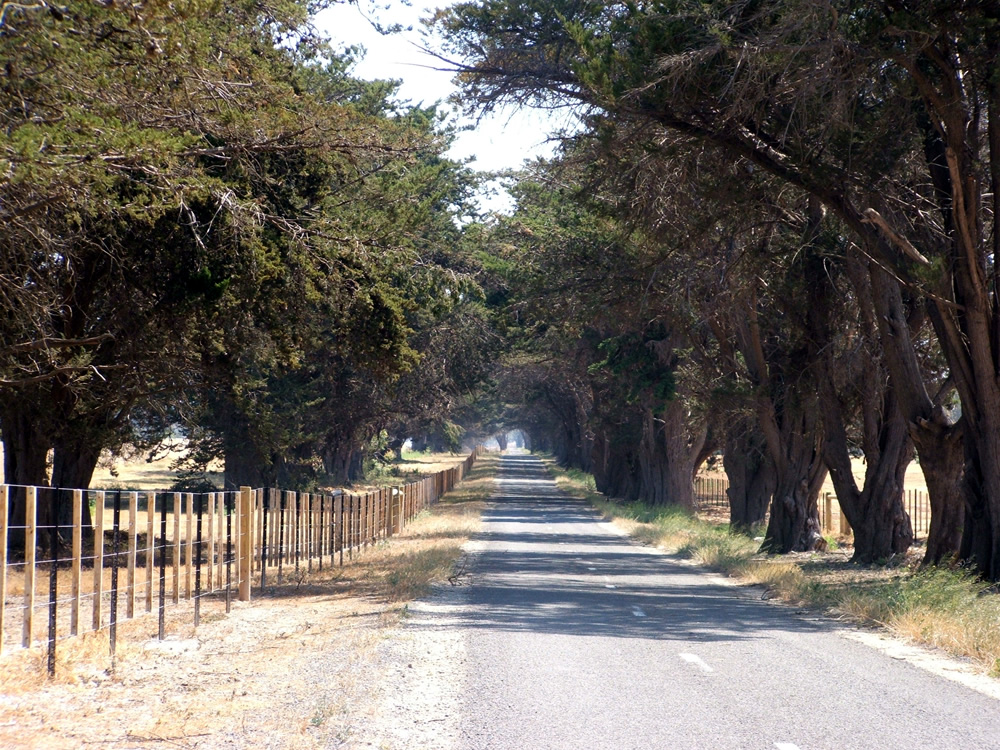
- Federation Trail near Werribee
- Length: Approx. 28 kilometres (17 mi) from Yarraville to Werribee
- Location: Melbourne, Victoria, Australia
- Difficulty: Easy
- Hazards: Magpies during breeding season.; Snakes in summer.
- Surface: Shared use, bitumen and gravel
- Hills: None
- Water: Infrequent
- Train(s): Werribee line (Hoppers Crossing, Spotswood and Werribee stations)
- Bus: 153, 154, 232, 400, 411, 412, 903

The Federation Trail is a 28-kilometre-long (17 mi) shared use path for cyclists and pedestrians, which mainly follows the heritage-listed Main Outfall Sewer through the western suburbs of Melbourne, Victoria, Australia. There are three bridges spanning across major arterial roads, as well as button-activated traffic light crossings at most other major road-trail intersections.

For safety reasons, cyclists are no longer allowed to ride on the metropolitan section of the Princes Freeway (or any other urban freeway). The Federation Trail therefore is the preferred alternative route. West of Werribee, where the Federation Trail ends, Geelong-bound cyclists may use the freeway shoulders, as it is then considered a rural freeway.

The trail was officially opened on 22 October 2006.

In 2010 work started on extending the trail from Millers Road to Williamstown Rd. Completion of stage 1 of the VicRoads Truck Action Plan should see the trail finally connected from Williamstown Road to the Hobsons Bay Coastal Trail on Hyde Street. In March 2011, work on the extension stopped completely, due to a change of government and troubles with funding and design of the bridge to Fogarty Avenue. Thirteen hundred metres of concrete path had been built which lay idle until November 2014, when the bridge was completed.

In November 2014, VicRoads announced that the trail has been extended from Millers Road to Fogarty Avenue in Yarraville with the completion of the 124-metre-long (407 ft) Brooklyn Bridge over the Brooklyn freight line. The next two stages include extending the trail to Williamstown Road and Hyde Street.

In December 2025, with the opening of the West Gate Tunnel, the trail has been extended another 2 kilometres to finally complete the link to the Hobsons Bay Coastal Trail and thus the Yarra River after the opening of the new elevated path parallel to the West Gate Bridge finishing at Hyde Street at the boundary of Spotswood and Yarraville. This includes ramps and bridges over Williamstown Road and the Werribee/Williamstown railway corridor and an exit towards Hall Street in Spotswood and a bridge across Stony Creek. This connects with Bay Trail West, the Westgate Punt, Shepherd Bridge and the Dixon Veloway through Hyde Street.

An interactive map of the trail as well as others in the Melbourne area is available from the 'External Links' section in this article.

== Route ==
Much of the trail follows the historic reservation of the heritage listed Main Outfall Sewer which was built in the 1890s. At that time the sewer was the largest civil engineering project ever undertaken in Victoria. The associated pumping station can be found in the Scienceworks Museum complex. In recent years, the Greening the Pipeline initiative is exploring opportunities to transform the Main Outfall Sewer into a parkland to connect communities, and provide a unique space to meet, play and relax. This project is a partnership between Melbourne Water, Wyndham City Council, VicRoads and City West Water. The project is supported by Greening the West.

Snakes may be seen in the Skeleton Creek and Werribee River areas during hot weather. Walkers are advised to stay on the path to enjoy the scenery.

Landmarks include the Kororoit Creek, a tunnel under the Western Ring Road freeway, RAAF Williams (Laverton base), Lawrie Emmins Reserve, Skeleton Creek, Werribee Mercy Hospital, Victoria University (Werribee campus), Werribee Park, Werribee Open Range Zoo, and the Werribee River.

=== Connections ===
The western terminus of the trail is with its junction with the Werribee River Trail at Werribee where there is access to the Princes Freeway at this point. Near Hoppers Crossing, it intersects with the upper section of the Skeleton Creek Trail. The trail intersects the Western Ring Road Trail 3.7 kilometres (2.3 mi) west of Millers Road. It then crosses Millers Road at Brooklyn and then goes in parallel north of the West Gate Freeway and joins Fogarty Avenue in Yarraville, which meets with the Stony Creek trail. The eastern terminus of the trail is at Hyde Street in Yarraville, near Spotswood where it connects with the Hobsons Bay Coastal Trail.

Another option of riding into the Melbourne City Centre is to leave the Federation Trail at Geelong Road and ride along the service lanes (and a pedestrian subway under the railway) to connect with one of the numerous paths or streets which go east-west through the Footscray area.

== See also ==
- Bicycle paths in Melbourne
