= Parklands adjoining the Yarra River =

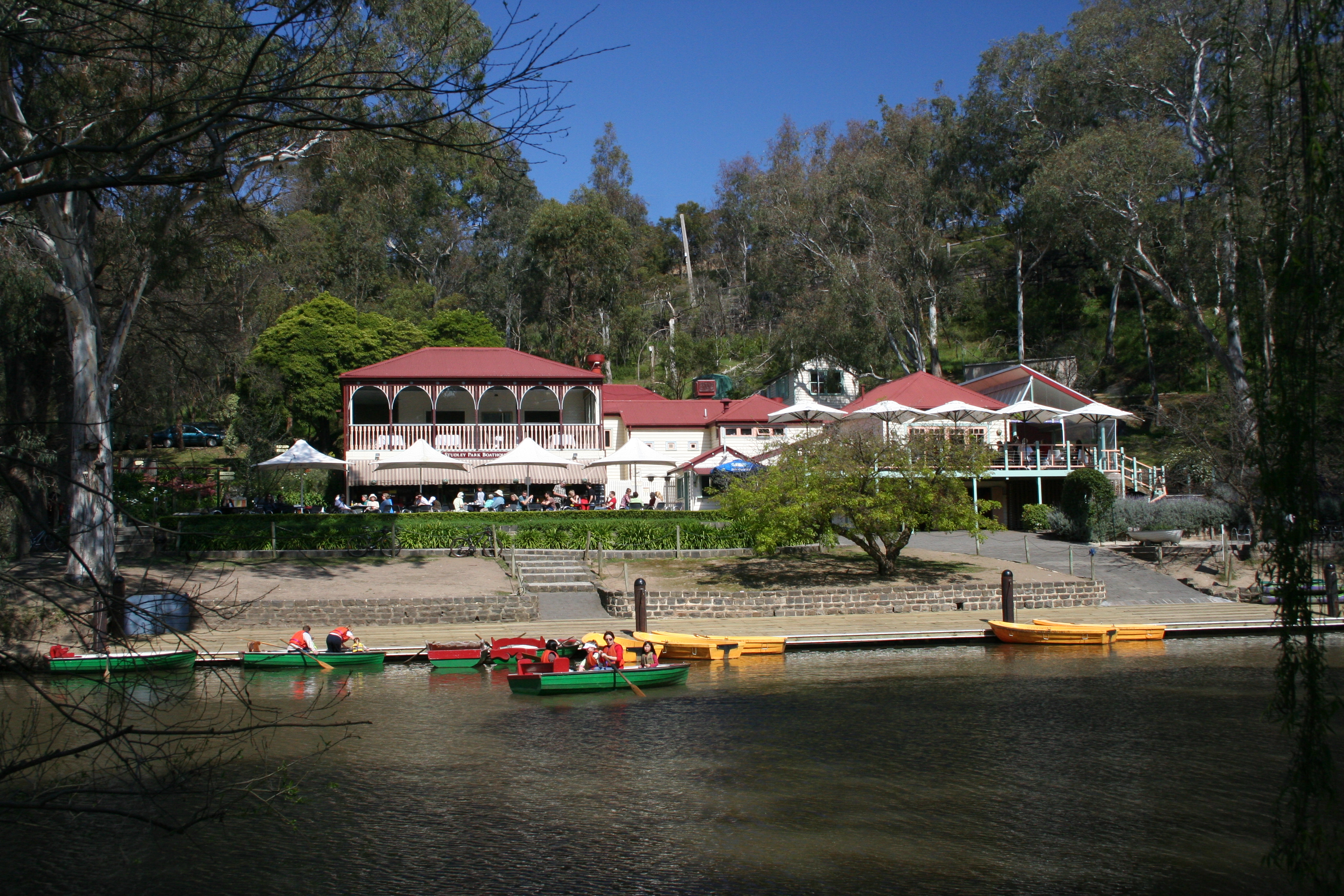
Studley Park Boathouse on the Yarra River

The Yarra River is a river in southern Victoria, Australia that flows through the city of Melbourne. There are many parklands, including state parks and national parks, that adjoin the river along its 250 km length. Every park listed has walking tracks, smaller parks usually have unsealed paths, while bigger parks will have sealed pathways suitable for walking and cycling. The Yarra River Trail runs along much of the length of the river's lower reaches through Melbourne. Most parks listed have parking available, the quality and quantity of which varies according to the size of the park. Dogs are not permitted in parklands adjoining the river unless otherwise stated in special off-lead areas.

== Parklands ==
Below is a list of parklands that adjoin the Yarra River, their locations and their uses (from downstream to upstream):

- Greenwich Reserve – Newport (baseball, toilets, jetty)
- Newport Park – Newport (athletics track, skate park, playground)
- Riverside Park – Newport/Spotswood (jetty)
- Westgate Park – Port Melbourne (toilets, lake)
- Stony Creek Park – Spotswood
- Batman Park – Melbourne (barbecue, toilets)
- Enterprize Park – Melbourne
- Birrarung Marr – Melbourne (playground, barbecue, toilets)
- Alexandra Gardens (bike hire, skate park, toilets)
- Kings Domain (barbecue, toilets)
- Royal Botanic Gardens – Melbourne
- Melbourne Park – Melbourne (sporting facilities, Rod Laver Arena)
- Olympic Park – Melbourne (sporting facilities)

- Gosch's Paddock (toilets, sporting oval)

- Darling Gardens – South Yarra (barbecue, playground, toilets)
- Herring Island Environmental Sculpture Park (barbecue, toilet)
- Como Park – South Yarra (sporting oval, playground, toilets)

- Como Park North (barbecue, café, toilets, sporting oval)

- Winifred Crescent Reserve – Toorak (playground)
- K. Bartlett Sporting and Recreation Complex – Burnley (toilets, sporting oval, playground, barbecue)
- Fairview Park – Hawthorn
- Wallen Road Reserve – Hawthorn (barbecue, toilets)
- Burnley Park – Burnley/Richmond (sporting oval, circus, toilet, barbecue, playground)
- O'Connell Reserve – Richmond (river landing)
- Yarra Bank Reserve – Hawthorn (playground, barbecue)
- Pridmore Park – Hawthorn (playground)
- Victoria Bridge Reserve – Kew
- Victoria Bridge Reserve – Kew
- Flockhart Reserve – Abbotsford (barbecue)
- Dights Falls Park – Abbotsford (toilets, lookout, historic buildings)
- Yarra Bend Park – Kew/Fairfield (sporting ovals, toilets, barbecues, lookouts, shelters)

- Dickinsons Reserve (picnic area, playground)
- F.A. Andrews Reserve (playground, picnic area, canoe ramp)
- Studley Park (restaurant, toilets, barbecues, boat hire, shelters, lookouts)
- Deep Rock Picnic Area (toilet, sporting ovals)
- Bellbird Picnic Area (toilet, shelter, barbecue, lookouts)
- Fairfield Park (restaurant, toilets, barbecues, shelter, boat hire, playground, amphitheatre, sporting oval)

- Coate Park – Alphington
- Alphington Park – Alphington (lawn bowls, toilet, barbecue, playground, sporting oval)
- Willsmere Chandler Park – Kew (the Kew Billabong, sporting oval, toilet)
- Chelsworth Park & Wilson Reserve – Ivanhoe (tennis, sporting ovals, playgrounds, toilet)
- Yarra Flats – Ivanhoe East/Eaglemont (sporting ovals, shelters, barbecues, toilets, info centre, various billabongs)
- Bulleen Park – Bulleen (archery, sporting ovals, pavilion, playground, barbecue, toilets)
- Banksia Park – Bulleen (shelters, barbecues, picnic areas, playground, toilets)
- Warringal Parklands – Heidelberg (sporting ovals, pavilion, barbecue, shelter, netball, tennis, toilets)
- Banyule Flats Reserve – Viewbank (sporting ovals, barbecue, various billabongs)
- Birrarung Park – Templestowe Lower (playground, shelters, barbecues, picnic areas, toilets, various billabongs)
- Unnamed Parklands – Lower Plenty
- Finns Reserve – Templestowe Lower (templestowe history pavilion, barbecue, playground, toilets, scout hall)
- Montpeller Reserve – Lower Plenty
- Westerfolds Park – Templestowe (toilets, shelters, barbecues, picnic areas, lookouts, canoe launching ramp, gallery and café)
- Candlebark Park – Templestowe (viewing platform, boardwalks)

- Petty's Orchard – Templestowe (operational orchards, boardwalks)

- Eltham Lower Park – Eltham (playground, barbecues, sporting ovals, miniature railway, pony club, lenister farm)
- Sweeneys Flats – Eltham (river flats and billabong)
- Tikalara Park – Templestowe (historic markers, Templestowe Hillclimb ruins)
- Glynn's Reserve – Eltham
- Morrison's Bushland – Eltham
- Unnamed Parklands – Warrandyte (Longridge Farm)
- Unnamed Parklands – Warrandyte North (Laughing Waters, Bobs Wetlands)
- Pound Bend Reserve – Warrandyte (toilet, canoe launching ramp, information)
- Warrandyte State Park* – Warrandyte/Warrandyte North/Wonga Park

- Pound Bend (rangers office, walking trails, views)
- Black Flat (walking trail, no dogs, no horses)
- Jumping Creek (barbecues, toilets, canoe launching ramp)
- Yarra Brae (walking trails)

- Cresco Park (scouting park)
- Taroona Reserve – Warrandyte (equestrian trail)
- Stiggants Reserve – Warrandyte (scout hall, playground, barbecue, toilets)
- Warrandyte/Kinglake Nature Conservation Reserve – Kangaroo Ground/Bend of Islands
- Clifford Park – Wonga Park (scouting park, camping, canoe launching ramp)
- Wittons Reserve – Wonga Park (canoe launching ramp, parking)
- Spadoni's Nature Reserve – Yering (model aircraft club)
- Yarra Glen Recreation Reserve & Showgrounds – Yarra Glen (sporting ovals, pavilions/shelters, barbecue, historic bridge)
- Everard Park – Healesville (picnic area, canoe launching ramp)
- Waramate Hills Flora & Fauna Reserve – Gruyere
- Waramate Nature Conservation Reserve – Gruyere (hiking trails in the Warramate Hills)
- Haining Farm – Launching Place (toilets)
- Doon Reserve – Yarra Junction (caravan park, shelter, public phone, toilets)
- Yarra State Forest – Warburton (hiking trails)
- Chisholm Park – Warburton (barbecue, toilets, sporting oval, lawn bowls, historic bridges)
- Yarra Ranges National Park (hiking trails)

(*) = Note: this list only includes parklands within the Warrandyte State Park that are adjoining the Yarra River.

== Gallery ==
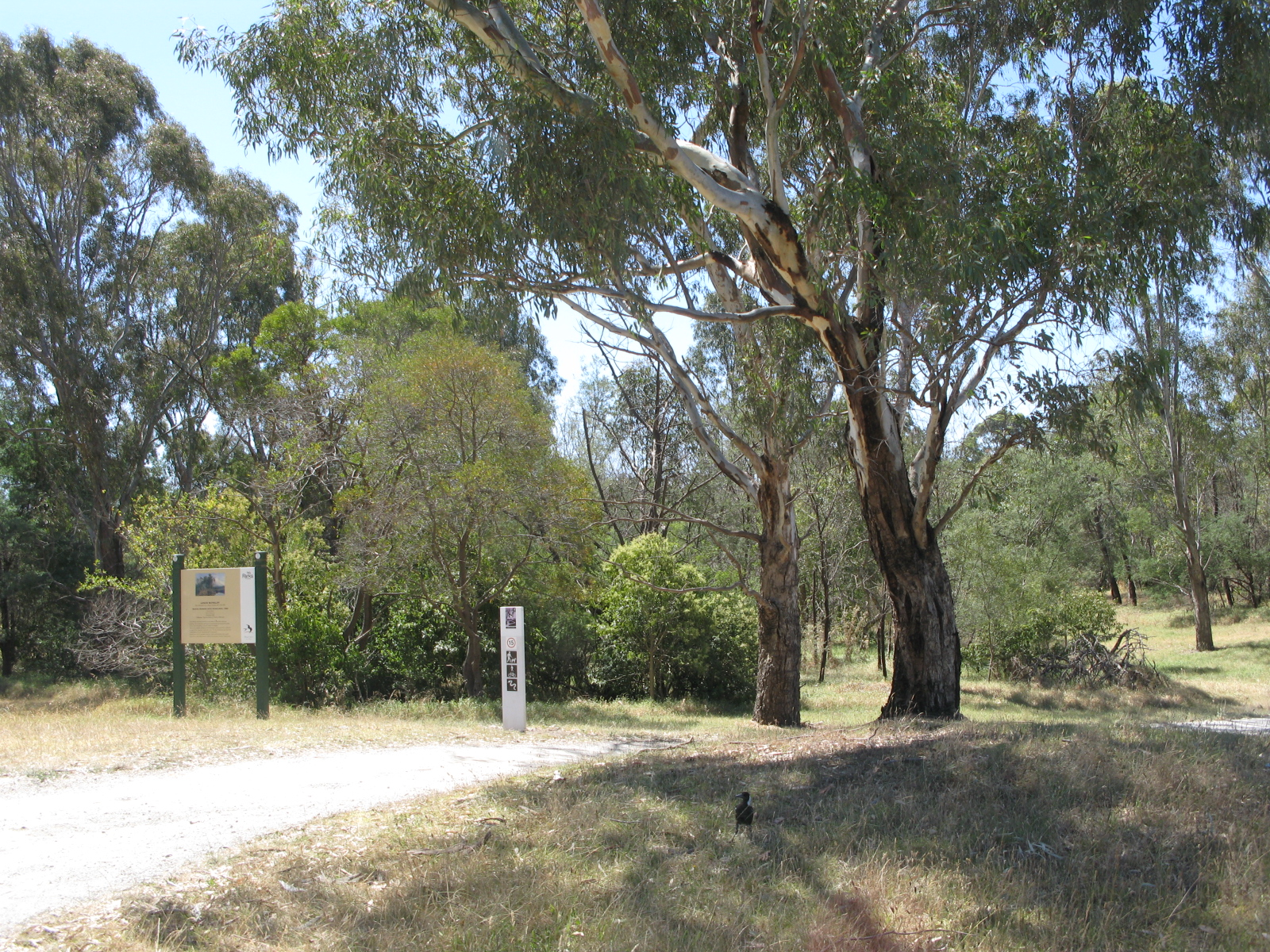
Yarra Flats Park

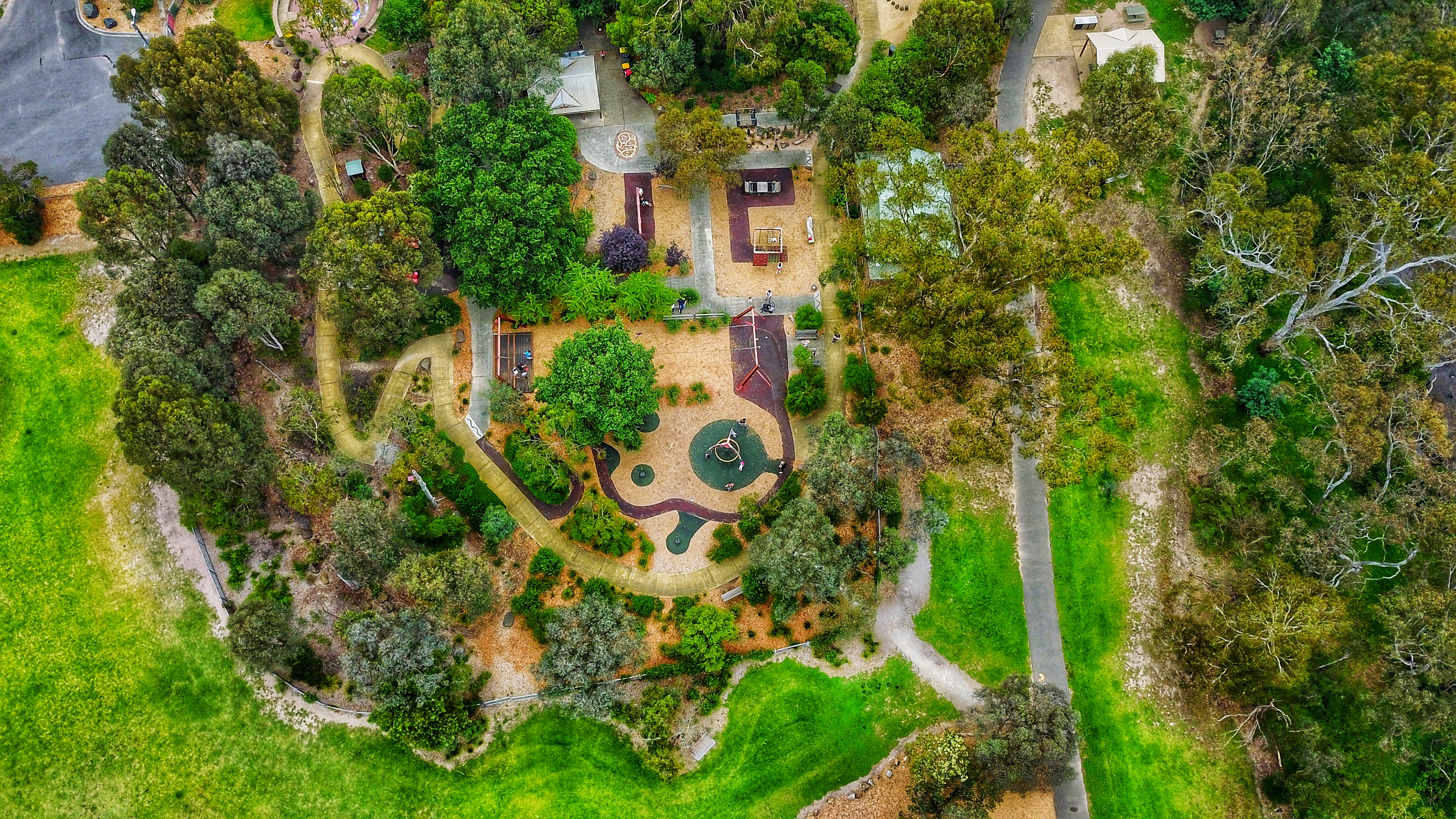
Wombat Bend Park

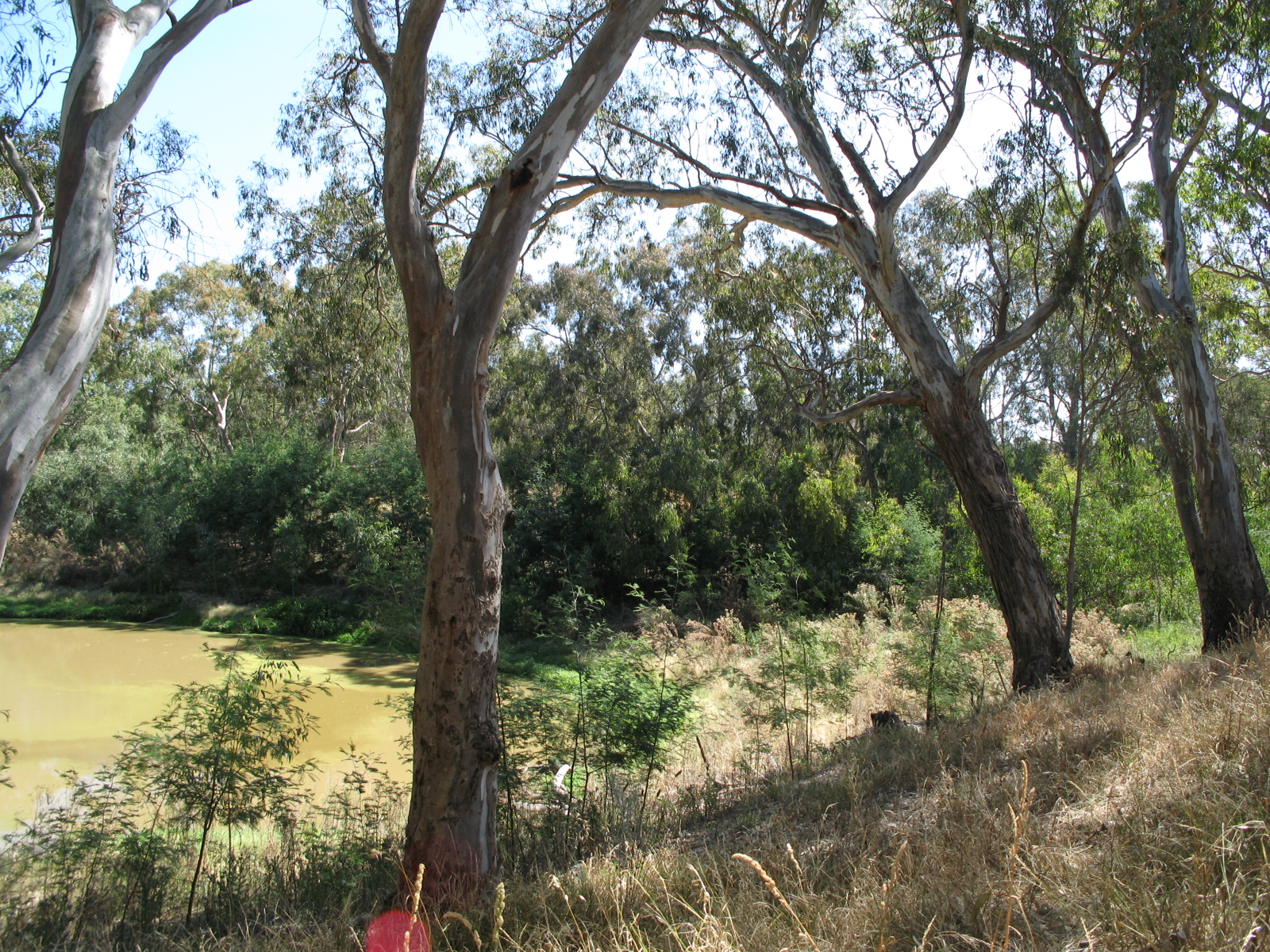
Bolin Bolin Billabong

== See also ==
- Yarra River
- Parks and gardens of Melbourne
- Geography of the Yarra River
- Parks in Victoria
