= Leioproctus rubellus =

Scientific classification
- Kingdom: Animalia
- Phylum: Arthropoda
- Clade: Pancrustacea
- Class: Insecta
- Order: Hymenoptera
- Family: Colletidae
- Genus: Leioproctus
- Species: L. rubellus

Binomial name
- Leioproctus rubellus (Smith, 1862)

Synonyms
- Dasycolletes rubellus Smith, 1862

Species of bee

Leioproctus rubellus, or Leioproctus (Leioproctus) rubellus, is a species of bee in the family Colletidae and subfamily Colletinae. It is endemic to Australia. It was described by English entomologist Frederick Smith in 1862.

== Distribution and habitat ==
The species occurs in Victoria. The type locality is Lower Plenty.

== Behaviour ==
The adults are flying mellivores.
