= Main Yarra Trail =

Shared-use path in Melbourne, Australia

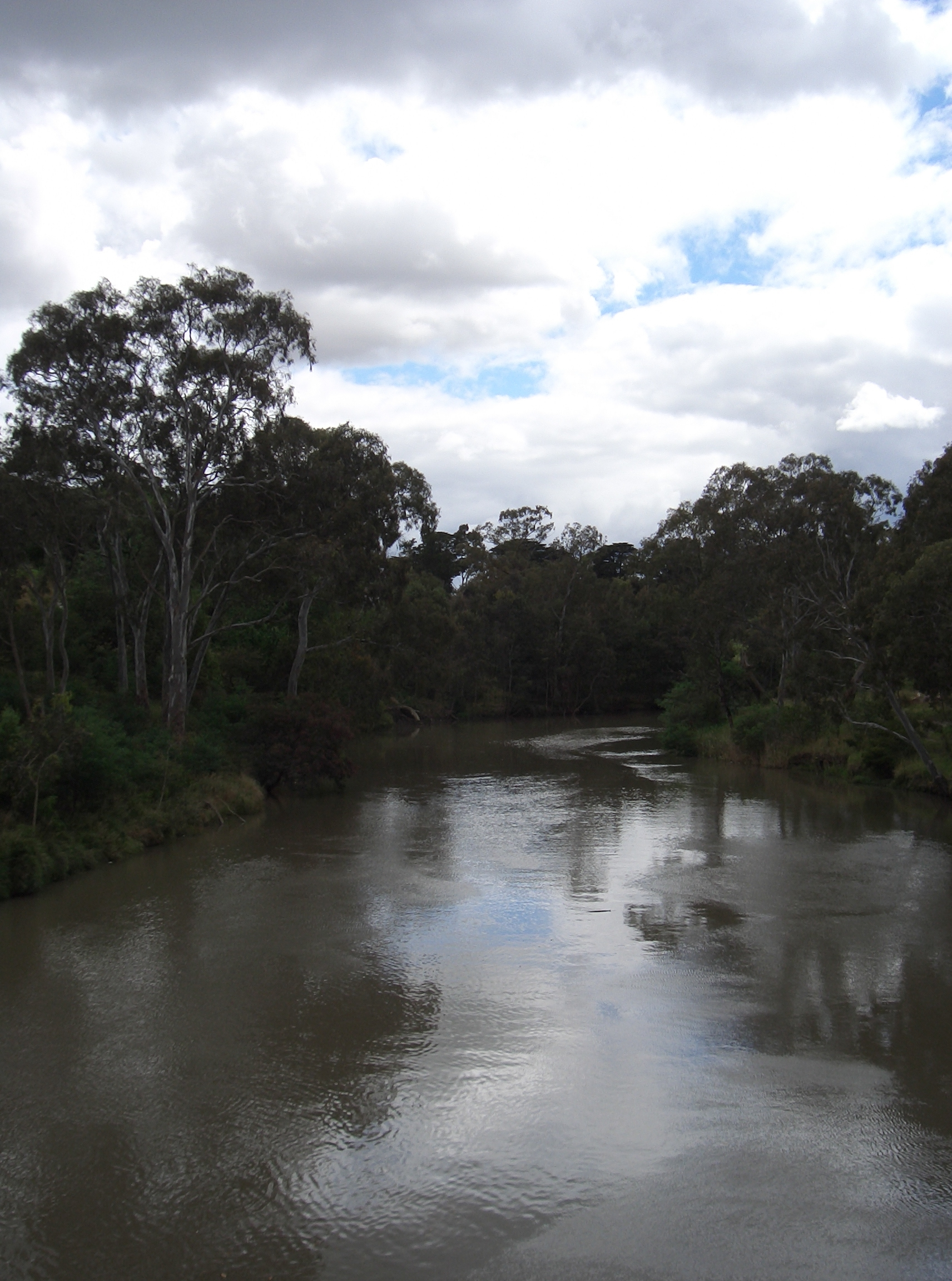
- Yarra River, from Kanes Bridge near the Studley Park boathouse in Yarra Bend Park
- Length: c.35 to 45 km (22 to 28 mi)
- Location: Melbourne, Victoria, Australia
- Established: November 1975
- Trailheads: Southbank Promenade, near Alexandra Gardens (west); 37°49′11″S 144°58′18″E; Mullum Mullum Creek Trail, at Templestowe (east); 37°44′24″S 145°09′45″E
- Use: Cycling; pedestrians (Shared-use path)
- Elevation gain/loss: ▲179 m (590 ft); ▼156 m (510 ft)
- Difficulty: Easy to medium
- Season: All year
- Hazards: Some blind corners; steep drop into the river; in winter, on the north bank near the city, ice can form on the floating pontoons; steep corkscrew path used to cross under Banksia St
- Surface: Concrete or bitumen (75%); Well-formed gravel (25%); Boardwalk (nom.%)
- Hills: Gipps Street steps; bumpy metal joints and slippery ramps on the Northbank promenade
- Water: Regular fountains in lower reaches; tap at "Yarra Marsh", Heidelberg
- Train(s): Flinders Street, Clifton Hill, Heidelberg and Eltham

The Main Yarra Trail, also known as the Yarra Trail, is a 35-to-45-kilometre (22 to 28 mi) shared-use path for cyclists and pedestrians, which follows the Yarra River through the northeastern suburbs of Melbourne, Victoria, Australia.

From its western terminus, the trail follows the Yarra from near Southbank, through the city and northeastern suburbs towards either Eltham or Westerfolds Park in Templestowe. At various times, the trail is on both sides of the river. Both the Main Yarra and Capital City trails use the same path from Melbourne city centre in the west, to Dights Falls in the east. From the Yarra Bend Park, the Main Yarra Trail continues eastwards and to slightly higher terrain towards Templestowe and reaches its eastern terminus at the trail's junction with the Mullum Mullum Creek Trail; and forms connecting trailheads with several other trails along its course.

In addition to the City of Melbourne, the trail passes through Stonnington, Yarra City, Boroondara, Banyule, Nillumbik, and Manningham local government areas. Large sections of the trail are administered by Parks Victoria.

As well as the Yarra River, major landmarks include—within close proximity to the trail—from west to east, the Melbourne Cricket Ground, the Royal Botanic Gardens, Southbank, Como House, Herring Island Sculpture Park, Abbotsford Convent arts precinct, Collingwood Children's Farm, Yarra Bend Park, Fairfield Boathouse, Heide Museum of Modern Art, Mia Mia Gallery and Westerfolds Park.

The trail is located on the traditional lands of the Wurundjeri.

== History ==
The first section to be built was between the Princes Bridge and Punt Road to the south of the Melbourne central business district, which opened in November 1975. The second section from Punt Road to the MacRobertson Bridge in Toorak and third section to Hawthorn Bridge were built in subsequent years.

Further extensions and improvements to the Trail were planned and funded as part of the Melbourne Bikeway Plan published in 1976, developed by the state Ministry of Transport and the University of Melbourne following extensive lobbying by Keith Dunstan of Bicycle Victoria.

The initial stages of the path were very successful with high usage. This sparked several campaigns to continue the route along the River northeast into Hawthorn, Kew, and Fairfield. The neighboring local government authorities began purchasing residential frontages to prepare for future construction of the Trail.

In November 1991, the bridge over the Yarra River at Finns Reserve was constructed. This brought the total length of the Trail to 20 kilometres (12 mi) at the time.

== Following the path ==
=== Western terminus ===
The trail has no clearly defined western terminus; with some claiming that the trail starts north of the West Gate Bridge; others claim that its western terminus is in Docklands at Webb Bridge, on the western side of Yarra's Edge, near the Melbourne Convention & Exhibition Centre.

However, the path is clearly articulated from the point where the often busy shared cycling and pedestrian boulevard with views of the Melbourne city centre, adjacent to the restaurant sector of Southbank, heads east, towards the boat sheds in Alexandra Gardens. As a consequence, estimates of the trail length can vary from 35 to 45 kilometres (22 to 28 mi).

=== Melbourne / Stonnington section ===
In the Melbourne city centre or in Southbank, at either the Sandridge, Evan Walker or Princes bridges, pedestrians and cyclists may choose the trail to Flinders Street station, on the north side of the river, or the path can be followed along the southern banks of the river. The path on the southern side of the river is wider than the path on the northern side and, consequently, less congested.

South side of the river

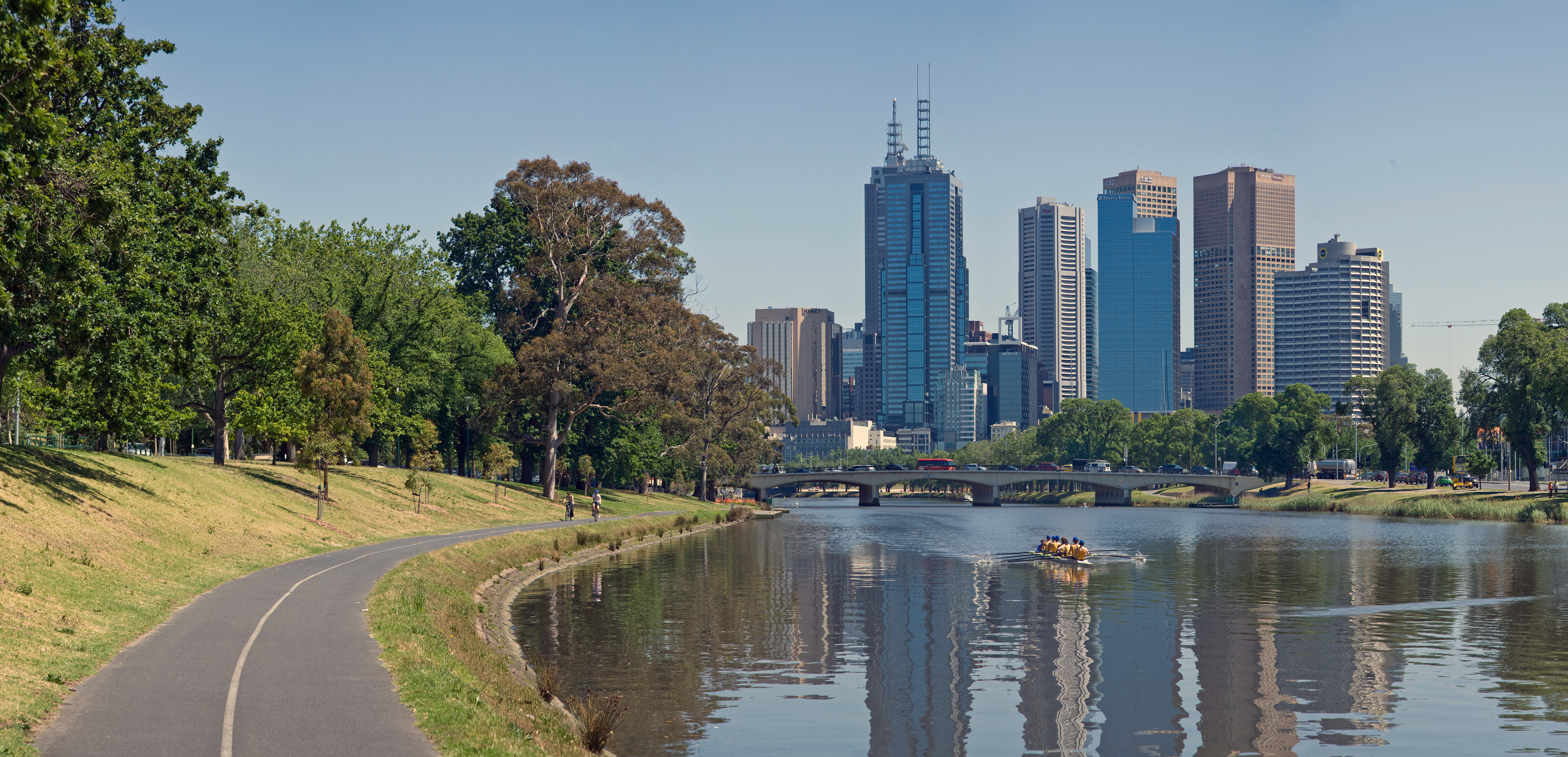
Looking west along the trail from South Yarra towards Princes Bridge, with the Melbourne city centre in the background, 2008

From Southbank, the trail heads east, past the boat sheds and goes through Alexandra Gardens and follows the course of the Yarra, past the Royal Botanic Gardens, through South Yarra, underneath the western abutment of the Swan Street Bridge, and underneath the southern abutments of the Morell, Hoddle, Cremorne railway, and Church Street bridges. Access is available to Como House and to Herring Island, the latter via punt from Como Landing.

The path continues east following Alexandra Drive, through the northern parts of Toorak before crossing the Yarra via a separated path on the eastern side of the MacRobertson Bridge. The path on the bridge also crosses the Monash Freeway and loops around from the north of the freeway to the south, via Yarra Boulevard, where it meets the Main Yarra Trail on the north side of the Yarra, in Burnley and enters the City of Yarra.

North (city) side of the river

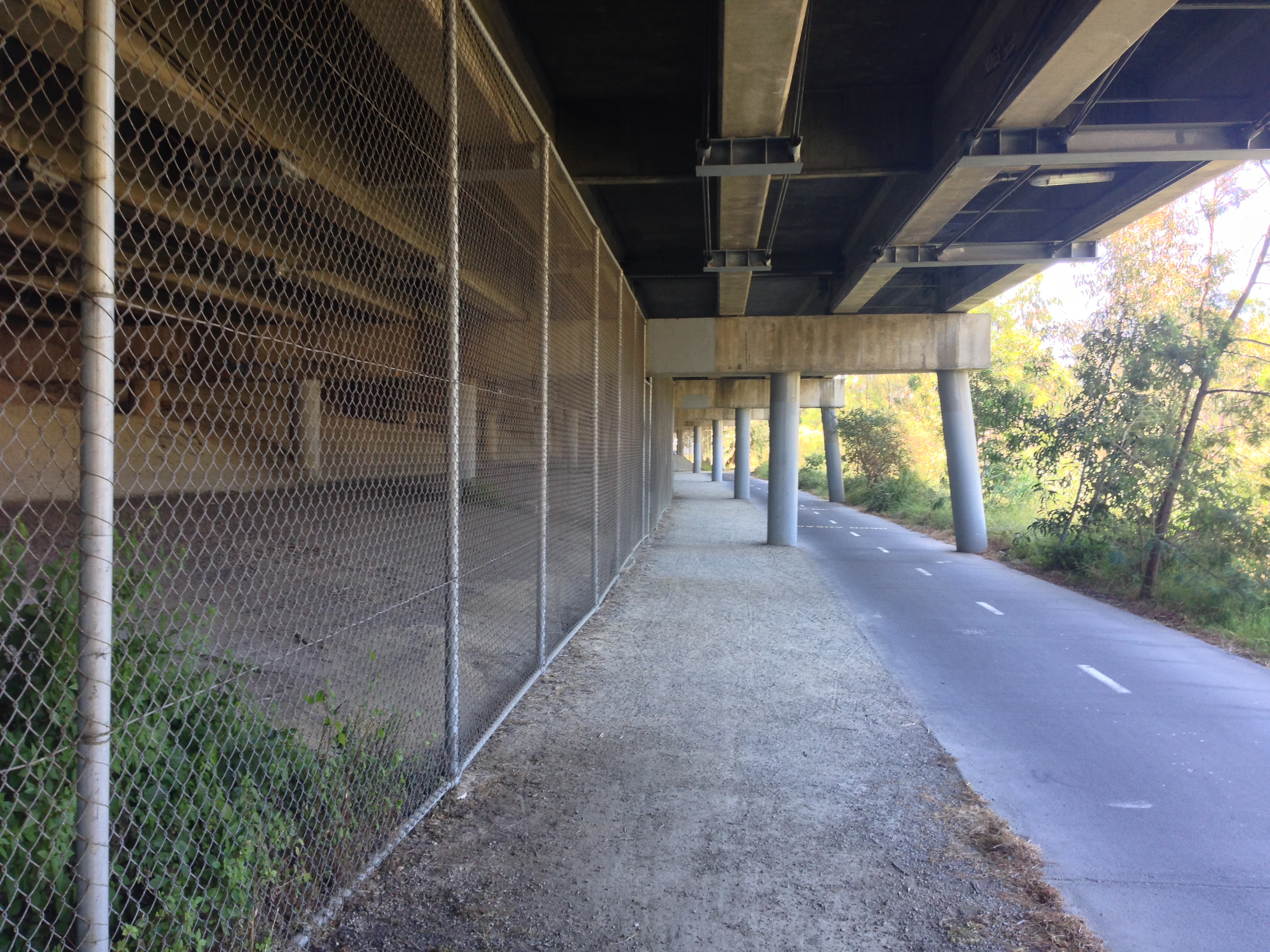
Trail under the Monash Freeway, near Cremorne

On the north side of the river the trail passes Federation Square and the riverside park of Birrarung Marr. A short deteour is available via the William Barak Bridge to the Melbourne Cricket Ground, with the John Cain Footbridge providing access back to the main trail. From Birrarung Marr, the trail follows the course of the Yarra, adjacent to the Melbourne Sports and Entertainment Precinct—inclusive of Yarra, Melbourne, and Olympic parks. The trail passes the Morell Bridge at grade—where a link is provided to Punt Road Oval and Gosch's Paddock. At Cremorne and then Richmond, the trail stays to the south of and, at times, underneath, the Monash Freeway. It passes under Punt Road via a passage under the northern abutment of the Hoddle Bridge, and subsequent passages under the northern abutments of the Cremorne railway and Church Street bridges until it enters Burnley, to join with the southern path, on the northern side of the Yarra.

=== Yarra City section ===
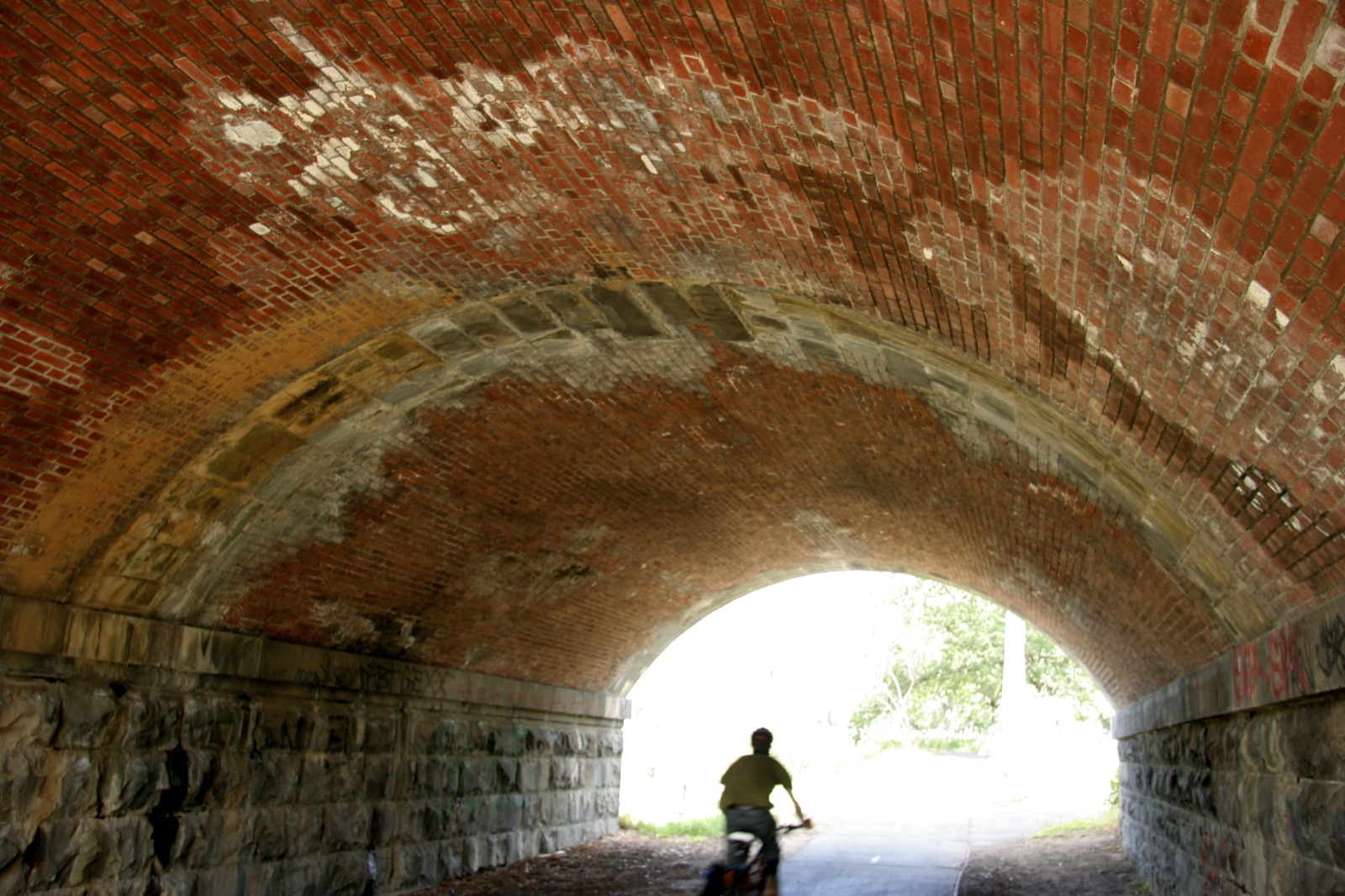
Cyclist on the Trail as it passes through one of the Hawthorn Bridge piers

On the north side of the river, the trail follows Yarra Boulevard, hooking around the Burnley campus of the University of Melbourne, under the northern abutments of the Heyington railway and meeting up with the Gardiners Creek Trail in Richmond. After going under the Victoria Street bridge in Abbotsford the path reaches the Walmer Street shared pedestrian and cycle bridge.

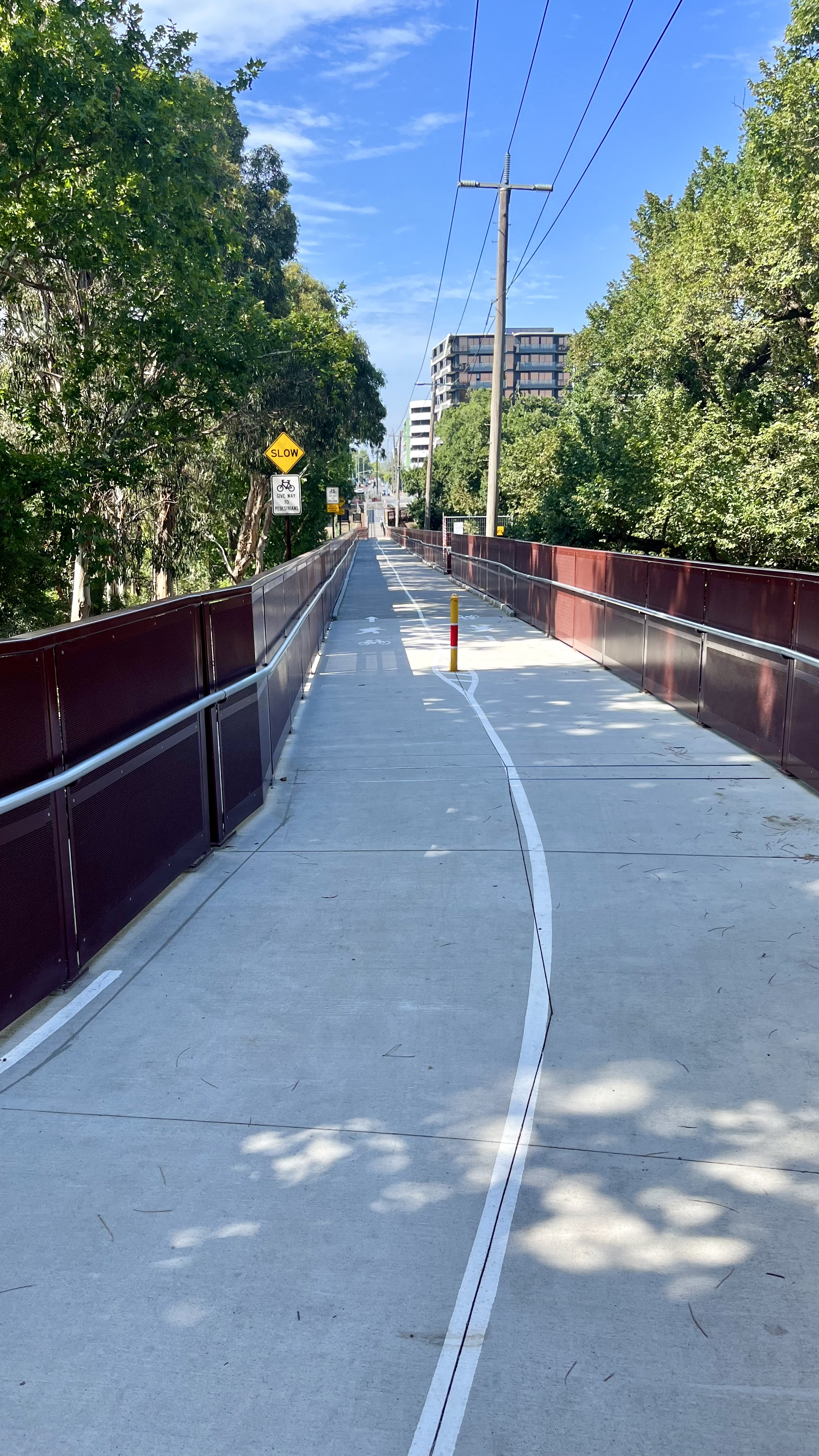
The surface of the trail across the Walmer Street bridge, 2024

Once across the bridge on the north side of the river, the trail continues up a short steep hill to the base of Walmer St and turns immediately to the left (west) into the park. The path continues until it reaches Yarra Boulevard, where the path descends to cross the Yarra River again at the Gipps Street shared pedestrian and cycle bridge. Alternatively, cyclists and pedestrians can continue to follow Yarra Boulevard to Studley Park.

At Gipps Street, flights of steps connect to the concrete path on the western side of the river. Some cyclists choose to avoid the steps and ride the back streets of Abbotsford to meet the trail at the Collingwood Children's Farm. An accessible, elevated path is replacing these steps and was expected to be completed at the end of 2025.

=== Boroondara section ===
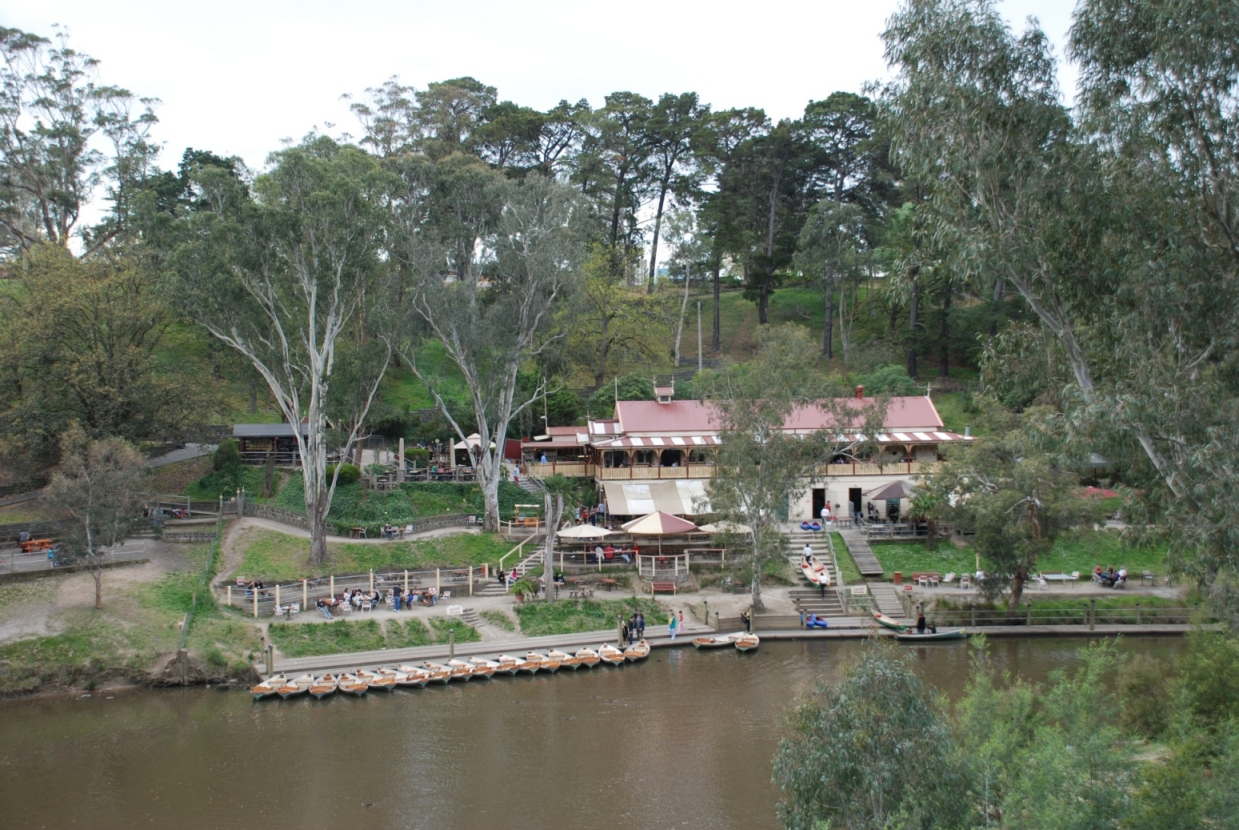
Fairfield boathouse

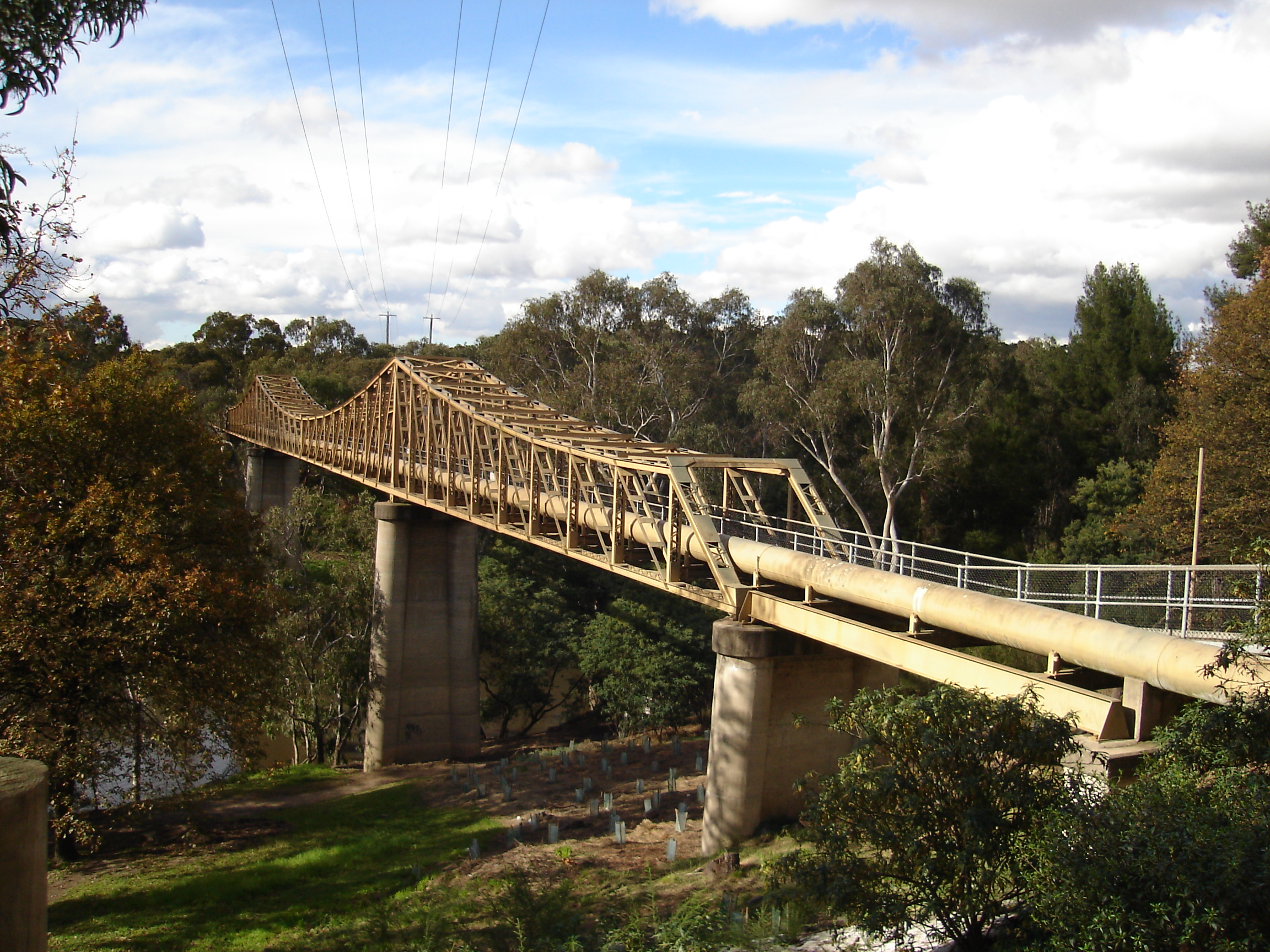
Fairfield Pipe Bridge in Yarra Park

A short way further the trail comes to Dights Falls. Here the Capital City Trail follows the Merri Creek Trail up the Merri Creek. The Yarra River Trail crosses the Merri Creek there, then passes under the Eastern Freeway. The trail commences a long gradual uphill climb to Melbourne Polytechnic, before crossing the Yarra River at the narrow pedestrian pipe bridge at the Fairfield boathouse. On the eastern side of the river, the path climbs steeply to Yarra Boulevard. From the top of the hill follow the Yarra Boulevard down to the Chandler Highway. A ramped connecting path leads under the main road and to the Yarra path, next to the National Guide Dog and Mobility Centre.

Next crossing upstream	Yarra River	Next crossing downstream
Johnston Street Bridge (vehicles)	Fairfield Pipe Bridge	Walmer Street Bridge (pedestrians; cyclists)

Proposed diversion

At this point, as of October 2025, as part of the North East Link and upgrade of the Eastern Freeway, from Hoddle Street to Springvale Road, the development of a new walking path was proposed. It was proposed that a new trail runs adjacent to the Eastern Freeway with a new bridge over the Yarra, and a new path underneath the Chandler Highway, located adjacent to the Eastern Freeway and rejoining the Main Yarra Trail a little further to the east.

Alternate option

An alternative to the main trail at Yarra Bend Park is to follow the Yarra Boulevard as it continues through the parkland of Yarra Bend following the river. It is a tourist drive with on-road cycling lanes, which provides access to the Studley Park boathouse, where row boats can be hired. After crossing the Eastern Freeway, the road climbs up a hill where it meets the Yarra Trail again.

Connection with the Anniversary Trail

The northern end of the Anniversary Outer Circle Trail is 600 metres (2,000 ft) from this point, on the south-eastern side of the Chandler Highway. The Anniversary Trail is across the bridge that crosses the Eastern Freeway. A safer alternative is to continue 1.5 kilometres (0.93 mi) along the Yarra River Trail from the Chandler Highway to Willsmere Park. At Willsmere Park there is a crossing under the Eastern Freeway to a traverse to the Anniversary Trail via Hyde Park.

The Yarra River Trail tracks along the northern edge of the Eastern Freeway with first the La Trobe Golf Club to the south over the river followed by the Kew Golf Club directly to the south. The Yarra River is rejoined near Burke Road. The trail crosses over a footbridge to the north side of the Yarra, just before the trail passes beneath the Burke Road bridge across the Yarra and Eastern Freeway. Straight ahead and to the right of the footbridge is the Koonung Creek Trail. From the footbridge, there is a hilly path, including a usually quiet on-road section (along The Boulevard, East Ivanhoe), to access the Sparks Reserve end of the Darebin Creek Trail.

=== Manningham section ===
Continuing the path travels along various natural features, including river flats, sporting ovals, market gardens, and paddocks with horses. There are many paths to explore as ride through Ivanhoe, Heidelberg, Lower Plenty and Templestowe to Westerfolds Park. On the way to Westerfolds Park, there are turnoffs to the River Gum Walk Trail, the Plenty River Trail and the Ruffey Creek Trail.

The southern section of the River Gum Walk Trail can easily be mistaken for the continuation of the Yarra River Trail. People coming from the south (from the City Centre) along the Yarra River Trail should turn right (east) 130m after crossing the canal at the end of Plymouth St, near the Banyule Tennis centre.

From the northeast corner of Westerfolds Park, the path continues up the Yarra River 1 km to Candlebark Park. Across the long footbridge at Candlebark Park gives access to the Diamond Creek Trail. This intersection is unsigned except for some instructions relating to the usage of the park.

The Yarra trail continues to follow the river past Petty's Orchards and finally ends at the confluence of the Mullum Mullum Creek and the Yarra River in Templestowe. A lookout surveys the spot. The Mullum Mullum Creek Trail starts here leading to points further afield. However, an extension to the Yarra Trail is currently being constructed, which will extend the path to Warrandyte, via Heidelberg-Warrandyte Road and Taroona Avenue.

== Trailheads ==
The Main Yarra Trail has the following connections or trailheads, from west to east:

Trailhead	Local government area	Location	Coordinates	Notes
Sandridge Trail	Melbourne	Port Melbourne	37°49′25″S 144°57′20″E	
Capital City Trail	Melbourne	Southbank	37°49′11″S 144°58′18″E	
Gardiners Creek Trail	Stonnington	Toorak	37°50′02″S 145°01′25″E	
Merri Creek Trail	Yarra City	Dights Falls	37°46′59″S 144°59′33″E	
Anniversary Trail (Note: Trailheads are approx. 600 metres (2,000 ft) apart, separated by the Eastern Freeway.)	Boroondara	Kew	37°47′32″S 145°01′49″E	
Darebin Creek Trail	Boroondara	Kew East	37°47′24″S 145°02′36″E	
Koonung Creek Trail	Boroondara	Balwyn North	37°48′15″S 145°12′16″E	
River Gum Walk Trail	Banyule	Rosanna	37°45′19″S 145°04′27″E	
Plenty River Trail	Banyule	Viewbank	37°45′00″S 145°05′34″E	
Ruffey Creek Trail	Banyule	Lower Plenty	37°45′09″S 145°07′03″E	
Diamond Creek Trail	Nillumbik Shire	Eltham	37°44′20″S 145°08′35″E	
Mullum Mullum Creek Trail	Manningham	Templestowe	37°44′24″S 145°09′45″E	

== See also ==
- Parklands adjoining the Yarra River
- Melbourne parks and gardens
