= Greensborough Bypass Trail =

Shared use path in Melbourne, Australia

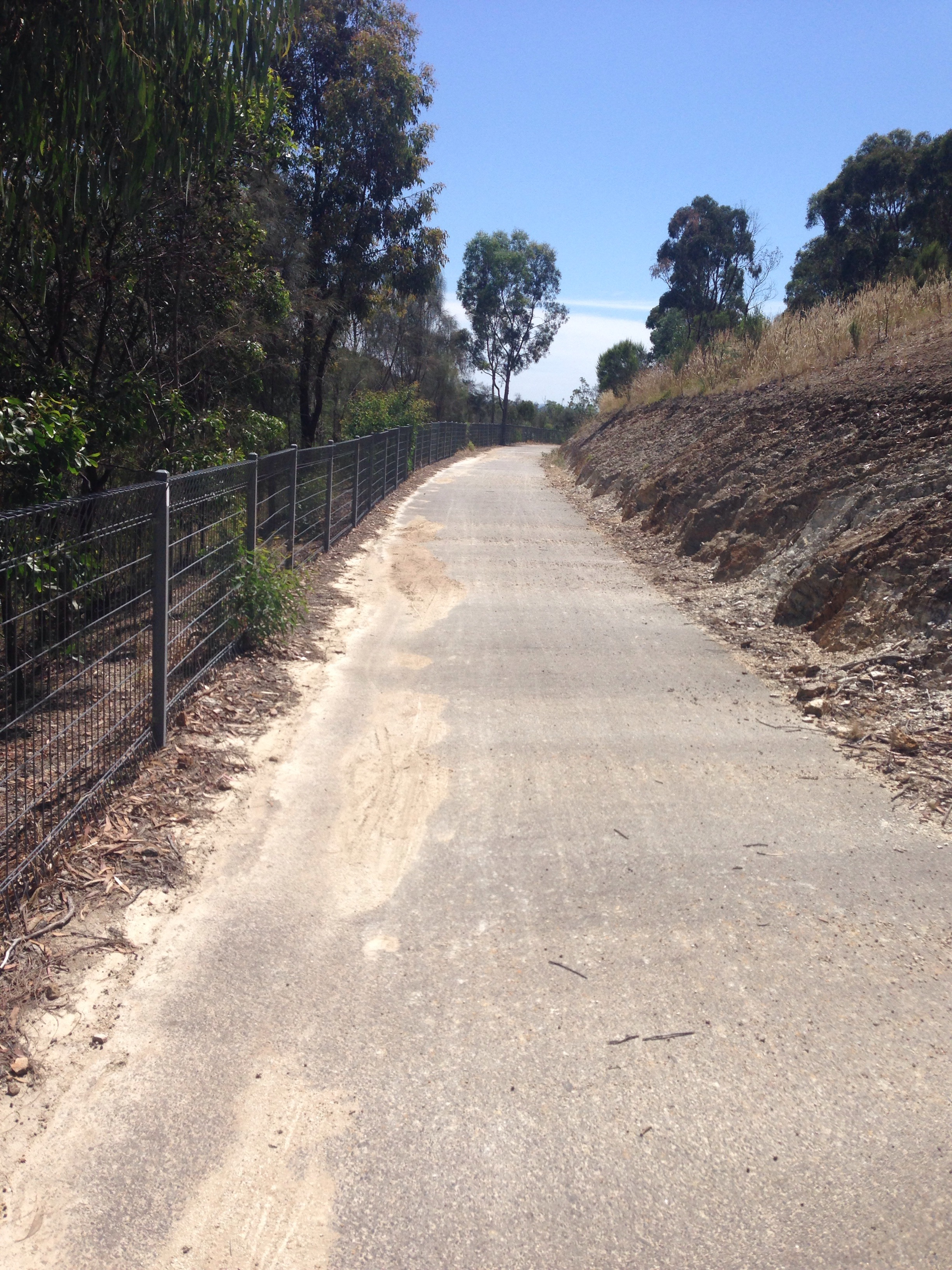
- The Trail passing through Watsonia North.
- Length: 4.1km
- Location: Melbourne, Victoria, Australia
- Difficulty: Easy
- Surface: Concrete and bitumen
- Hills: Some hilly sections
- Water: None
- Train: None

The Greensborough Bypass Trail is a shared use path for cyclists and pedestrians which follows the Greensborough Bypass through the north-eastern suburbs of Melbourne, Australia. It was built in 2006 as part of works to build the new road across around the suburbs of Greensborough and Watsonia North. The trail is managed by VicRoads.

== Following the path ==
The path starts at Grimshaw Street in Greensborough near the intersection with the Greensborough Bypass. It then follows the road north running along its eastern side. After crossing Kempston Street, which can be used to visit the Kalparrin Gardens, the path begins tending uphill.

After a gradual turn to the east and a moderately steep incline near Banfield Terrace, the path reaches the Plenty River and turns north underneath the Greensborough Bypass bridge to connect to the Western Ring Road Trail.

== Connections ==
The only connection to an existing off-road trail exists to the north where the path connects with the Western Ring Road Trail. No immediate connection exists to the south, however the River Gum Walk Trail is about 2 kilometres south, via suburban backstreets. While some lobbying by cyclists occurred to rectify this southern path in 2012, no progress has been made to date.
