= Johnston Street Bridge =

Bridge across the Yarra River in Melbourne, Australia

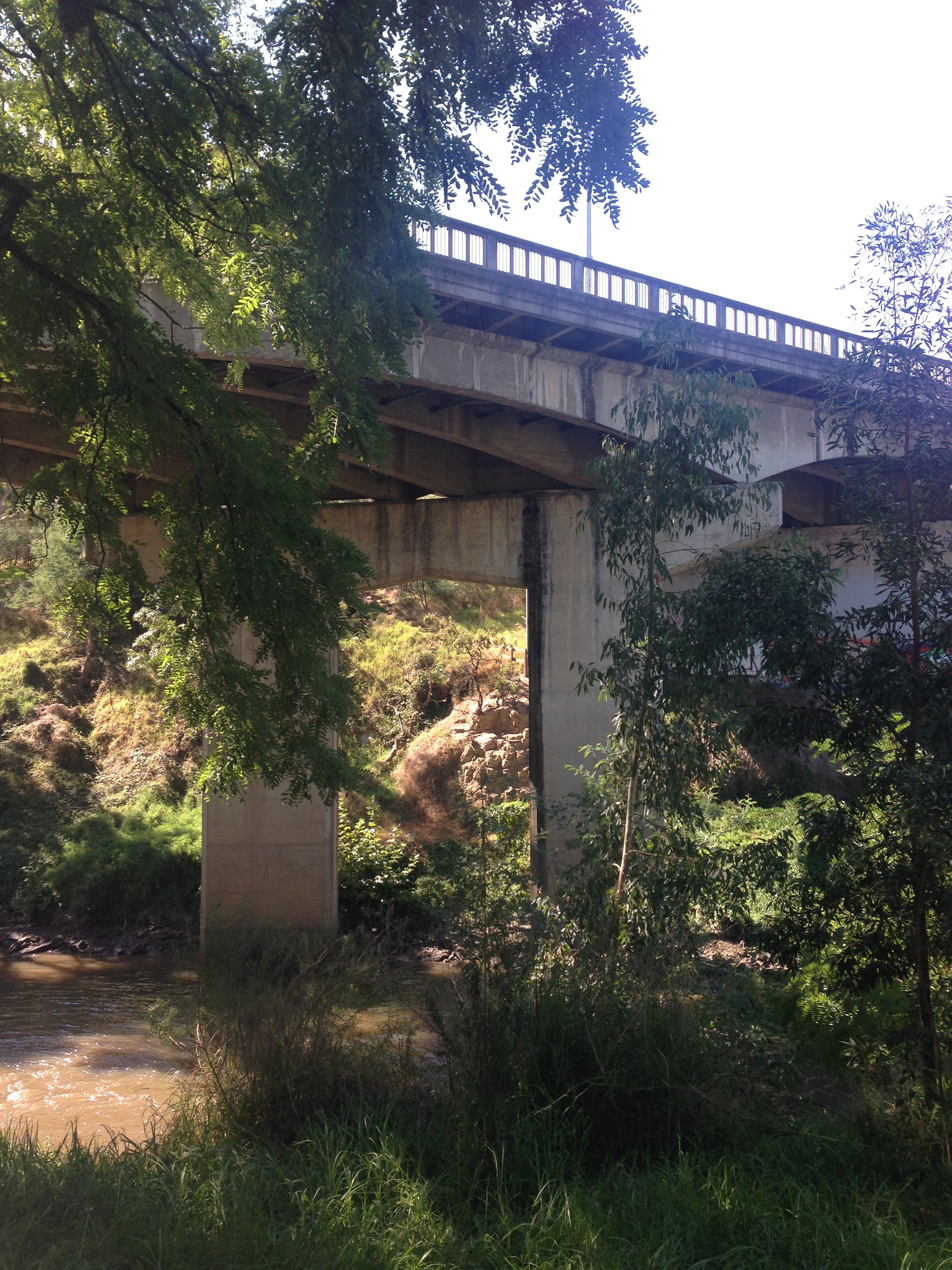
- Johnston Street bridge in April 2017
- Coordinates: 37°48′03″S 145°00′15″E
- Carries: Johnston Street, Studley Park Road
- Crosses: Yarra River
- Locale: Melbourne, Victoria, Australia
- Begins: Abbotsford (west)
- Ends: Kew (east)
- Other name: Studley Park Road bridge
- Owner: VicRoads
- Preceded by: Bushland Circuit Trail bridge
- Followed by: Fairfield Pipe Bridge

Characteristics
- Material: Reinforced concrete
- Total length: 30 m (98 ft)

History
- Designer: Bruce Watson
- Constructed by: Country Roads Board
- Opened: 1956; 70 years ago
- Replaces: Studley Park Road bridge (1876)

Location
- Interactive map of Johnston Street Bridge

The Johnston Street Bridge (also known as the Studley Park Road bridge) is a concrete road bridge across the Yarra River between Abbotsford and Kew, inner-eastern suburbs of Melbourne, in Victoria, Australia.

== History ==
Former bridge

The early 1837 survey for the Melbourne township established a preferred route to the east of the Yarra River along Johnston Street, which was confirmed in La Trobe's 1841 plan of proposed roads to outlying districts. This became one of the earliest road construction projects, with gangs of unemployed immigrants undertaking roadworks in 1842. Johnston Street was named after a Melbourne City Councillor in 1851 and a toll gate was installed soon after. The river could be forded nearby at Dight's Falls, but advocates for a bridge over the Yarra in 1855 debated over a preferred crossing at this site or near the end of Clarke Street or near the current Collins Footbridge. Another privately owned "Penny Bridge" was provided nearby at the end of Church Street in 1857.

The bridge is also known as the Studley Park Road bridge, with the first bridge having been built as a laminated timber arch with timber lattice truss spandrels in 1858 and was replaced with riveted wrought iron girders in 1876.

A section of the original riveted wrought iron lattice handrail survives as a fence across the surviving eastern bluestone abutment. The 1876 structure was built by W. A. Shand, father-in-law of prominent ironworker and engineer, Mephan Ferguson. The wrought iron spans were approximately 18 metres (59 ft) long, on the same alignment, adapting the original abutments. This was one of the first local bridges to employ cylindrical iron columns, which were filled with concrete to provide slender piers to reduce any impediment floodwaters.

Current bridge

The current bridge was constructed in 1954-56 by the Country Roads Board (CRB) using a design employing cast-in-place reinforced concrete curved T girders and an integral flat slab deck. The bridge was designed by Bruce Watson of the Country Roads Board. Watson went on to become later to become the CRB Chief Bridge Engineer. The bridge carries Metro Route 34.

The Abbotsford end of the bridge was the terminus of the Collingwood cable tramway line, with a car shed located nearby. The car shed was subsequently demolished. The line closed in 1939, and Kinetic Melbourne bus routes 200, 202 and 207 use the bridge.

== See also ==
- Crossings of the Yarra River

Next bridge upstream	Yarra River	Next bridge downstream
Bushland Circuit Trail bridge (pedestrians; cyclists)	Johnston Street Bridge	Fairfield Pipe Bridge (pedestrians; cyclists)
