= River Gum Walk Trail =

Shared use path in Melbourne, Australia

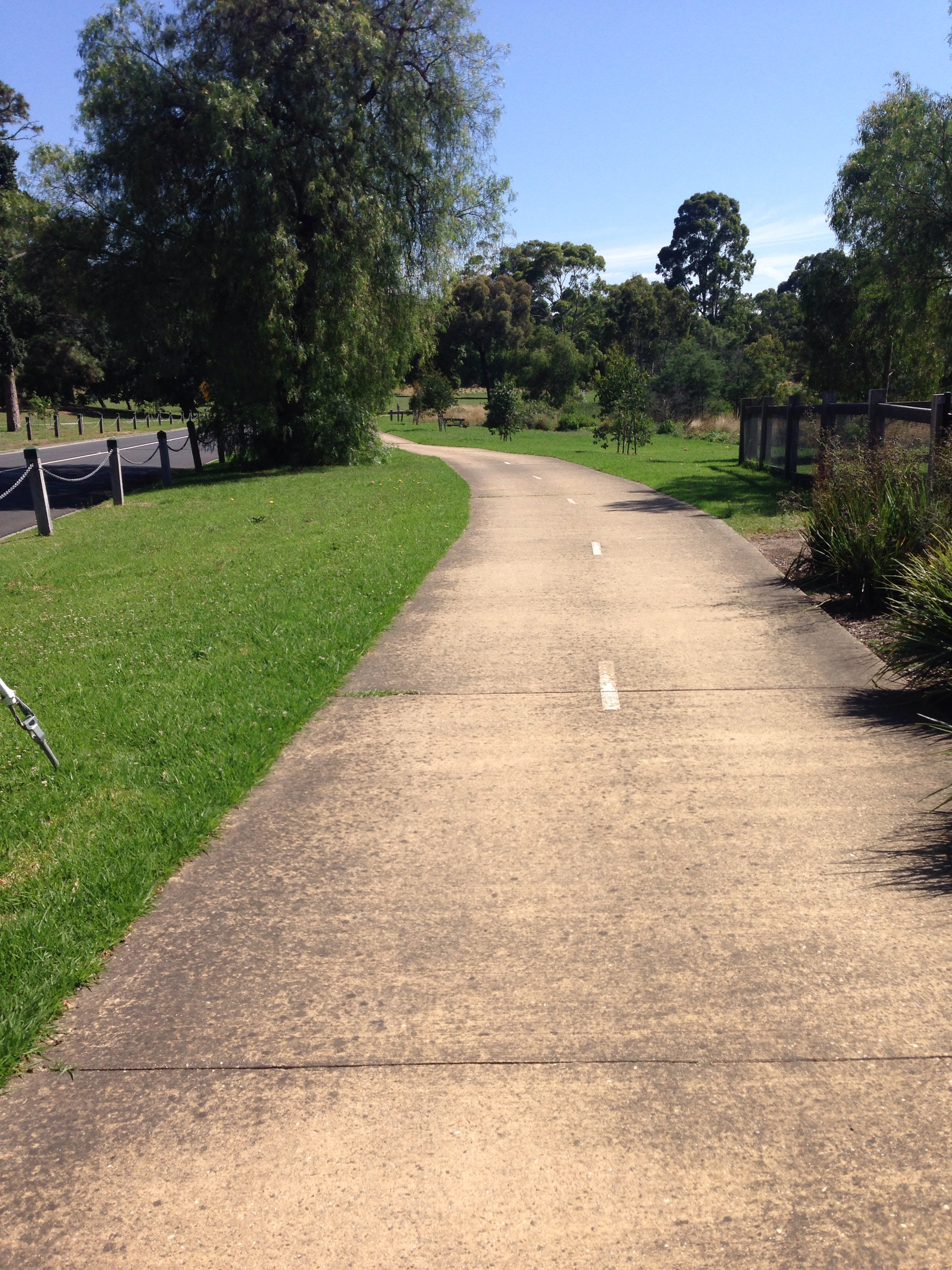
- River Gum Walk Trail near its intersection with the Yarra Trail.
- Length: 4.4km
- Location: Melbourne, Victoria, Australia
- Difficulty: Hard
- Surface: wide concrete
- Hills: steep in sections
- Water: none
- Train(s): Macleod station and Watsonia station

The River Gum Walk Trail is a shared use path for cyclists and pedestrians in the suburb of Rosanna, an inner northern suburb of Melbourne, Victoria, Australia.

== Following the path ==
The path starts in the north, at the northeast corner of Yallambie Road and Greensborough Highway. Heading south it passes by the west side of the Simpson Army Barracks in Watsonia, crosses Lower Plenty Road and then crosses Banyule Road and heads downhill past a stand of river red gums, crosses Buckingham Street and continues past Banyule Theatre (Viewbank College). Further along it passes Warringal Park on its west side and then intersects the Yarra River Trail.

The southerly section of the River Gum Walk Trail can easily be mistaken for the continuation of the Yarra River Trail. People coming from the south along the Yarra Trail should turn right (east) 130 m after crossing the canal at the end of Plymouth Street, near the Banyule Tennis centre.

== Connections ==
Dead end in the north. However, the Greensborough Bypass Trail, just 2 km to the north at Grimshaw Street, can be reached by travelling parallel and to the east of Greensborough Highway, using these quiet roads and the interlinking pathways: Yallambie Road, Watson Street, Service Road, Dennett Street and finally Greensborough Road.

Yarra Trail at the southern end. A quick diversion down Buckingham Street (250 m) also leads to the Yarra Trail.

North end at 37.71906°S 145.08138°E. South end at 37.75527°S 145.07422°E.
