= Westerfolds Park =

Park in Templestowe, Melbourne, Victoria, Australia

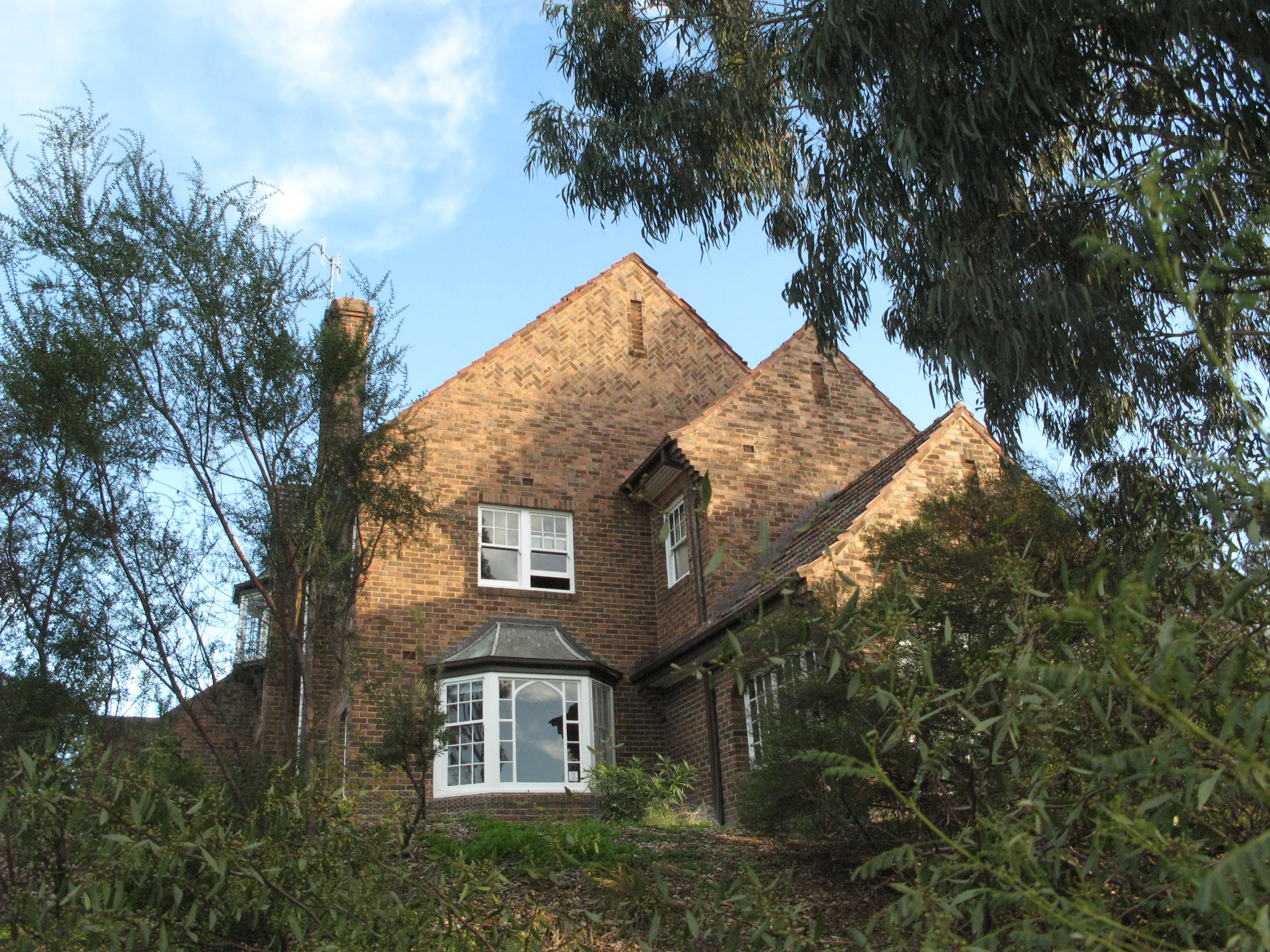
- The Manor House in Westerfolds Park

- Location within Melbourne
- Interactive map of Westerfolds Park
- Type: Urban park
- Location: Melbourne, Victoria, Australia
- Coordinates: 37°44′49″S 145°07′44″E
- Area: 123 ha (300 acres)
- Opened: 1977
- Operator: Parks Victoria
- Status: Open (6am-6pm; or 9pm AEDT)
- Paths: 5 km (3.1 mi): sealed and unsealed
- Terrain: Bushland and hills
- Water: Yarra River, Kestrel Creek
- Vegetation: Australian natives, grasslands
- Public transit: Bus
- Landmarks: Yarra River, Manor House
- Facilities: Toilets; barbecues; playground; canoe ramp

Westerfolds Park is an urban park, part of the Yarra Valley Parklands, situated in Templestowe, an eastern suburb of Melbourne, Victoria, Australia.

Westerfolds is classified as a metropolitan park and conserves riparian habitat within the Melbourne urban environment. The park nestles into a hilly bend in the Yarra River and has a network of bitumen and gravel paths, shelters, playgrounds, picnic tables and electric barbecues. It is a popular spot for picnics, and family gatherings on the weekend and public holidays. Other recreational pursuits include walking, cycling, rollerblading, walking the family dog, canoeing, horse riding and bird watching.

Near the centre of the park atop a large hill lies the Manor House which housed the Mia Mia Gallery and Cafe, Indigenous Australian cultural education programs and gallery exhibiting Indigenous Australian Art. Mia Mia closed in 2013 and is no longer situated at the Park. New business tenants are currently being sought with a view to further develop, refurbish and restore the manor.

== History ==
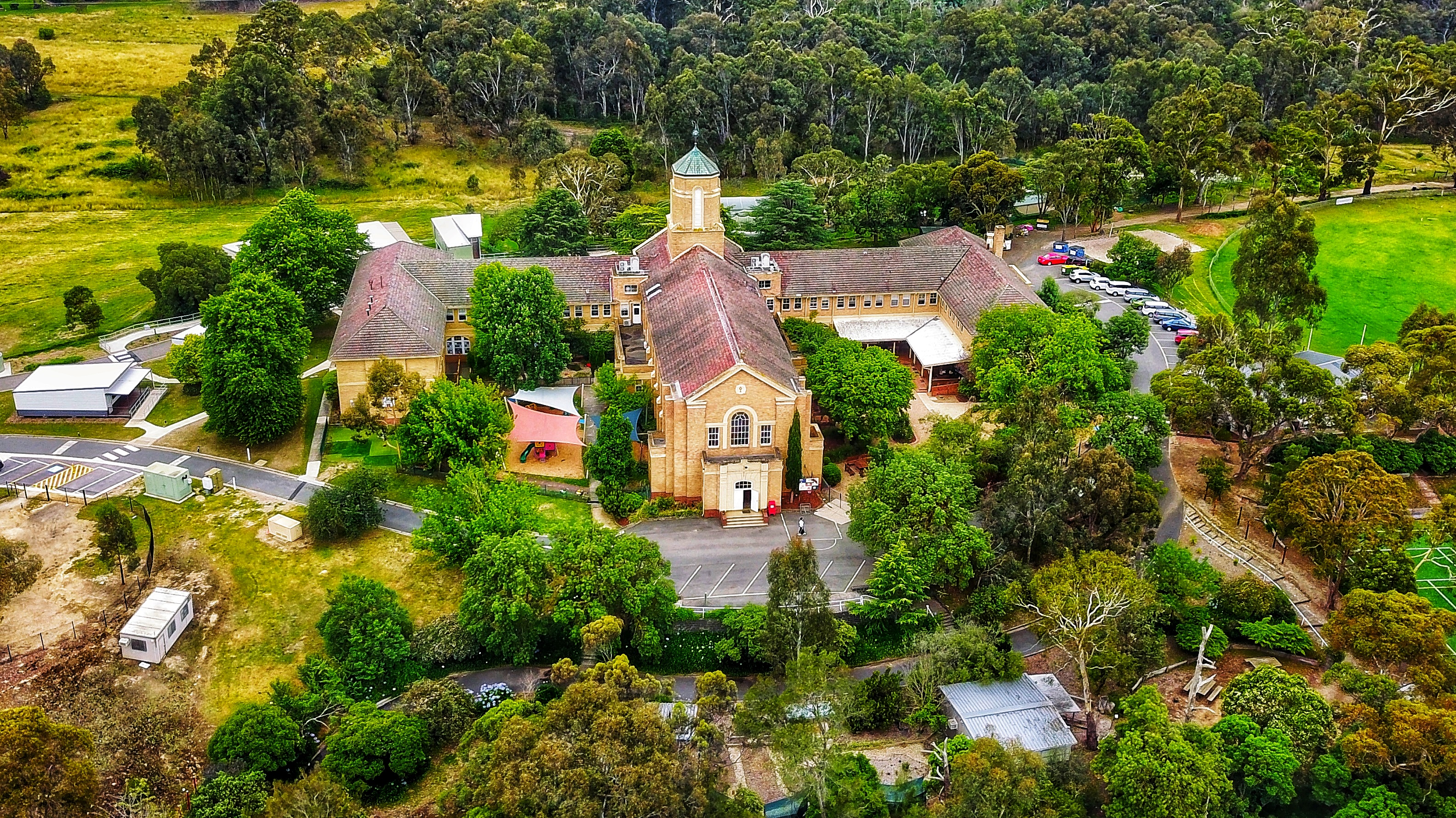
Aerial view of Odyssey House along the Yarra River Trail, right across Westerfolds Park, 2018

In 1846 the land was purchased from the Crown. In the early 1930s, the Turner family bought the property and built the Manor in 1936. After World War II many of the dairy farms and orchards in the surrounding area were subdivided for urban development. Because of flooding in the Yarra River, Westerfolds was not subdivided and was eventually added to the Yarra Valley Parklands in 1977. Parks Victoria (then known as Melbourne Parks and Waterways) took over the management and conservation of Westerfolds Park in 1978.

Revegetation and conservation programs are underway with the re-establishment of native grasslands and wetlands. Over 400 plant species native to the area can now be found including eucalypts, acacias, river red gums, and native grasses and shrubs. Visit in late winter and early spring to experience the wattle trees blooming throughout the park. Parrots, cockatoos, kookaburras, water and small bush birds can be seen, along with bats, platypus, wombats, koalas, possums, echidnas and, eastern grey kangaroos.

== Recreation ==
Westerfolds Park forms part of the main Yarra River Trail for cyclists and walkers to explore the Yarra river valley to the Melbourne CBD. Cyclists can access Westerfolds Park via the 4 km Diamond Creek Trail from Eltham station.

=== Cycling ===
The Yarra River Trail runs through the park. There is over 5 km of sealed pathways in very good condition, much of it is of generous width with a centre dividing line, gutters and drains. Many cyclists take the paths at high speed, particularly the through-route paths as cyclists travel through the park on longer journeys. Most pedestrians are considerate of cyclists and walk on the left hand side of pathways.

Off road, there are many obscure dirt or gravel pathways winding through the bush, most of it is very flat and mainly used by casual cyclists as alternative routes to the sealed pathways. Occasionally, small mountain bike events are held on the trail in the middle of the park that crosses Kestrel Creek several times over a series of narrow boardwalks. Pedestrians occasionally use these boardwalks and it can be dangerous taking them at high speed unless the area is taped off for an event.

=== Walking and Running ===
The 5 km of sealed pathways provides excellent conditions for runners and walkers, there are 4 or 5 drinking fountains evenly distributed throughout the park, roughly every kilometre, and seats and benches at similar intervals. Schools from the surrounding area hold annual fun run events in the park, this usually involves using 2 tracks, a short loop and a longer loop. Some small change rooms are available in the toilet facilities but these are infrequently kept. Snakes are rarely encountered unless pedestrians wander onto dirt and gravel paths. Pedestrians should always remain on the left hand side of pathways to enable safe shared use by cyclists and pedestrians. It is also the location for Westerfolds parkrun. A free, weekly, timed 5 km running event open to everybody.

== Facilities ==
- Manor House – toilets
- Toilets (3) – in the south and north-eastern areas
- Barbecues (2) – in the south and north-eastern areas
- Canoe Launching Ramp – in the north-eastern area, just downstream from Fitzsimons Lane Bridge
- Designated Picnic Areas (4) – in the south, south-east and north-eastern areas
- Information Boards (4) – located along the sealed pathways
- Viewing Platforms (2) – in the north-east and north-western areas, on the river banks overlooking rapids
- Car Parking – over 100 spaces available

== Access ==
The park is open every day, including weekends and public holidays, from 8:30 am to 5:00 pm, and during daylight saving time from 8:30 am to 8:00 pm, extending to 9:00 pm in peak summer periods. Access is via road through gates on Porter Street and Fitzsimons Lane, while pedestrian & cycling pathways remain open at all hours.

== Gallery ==
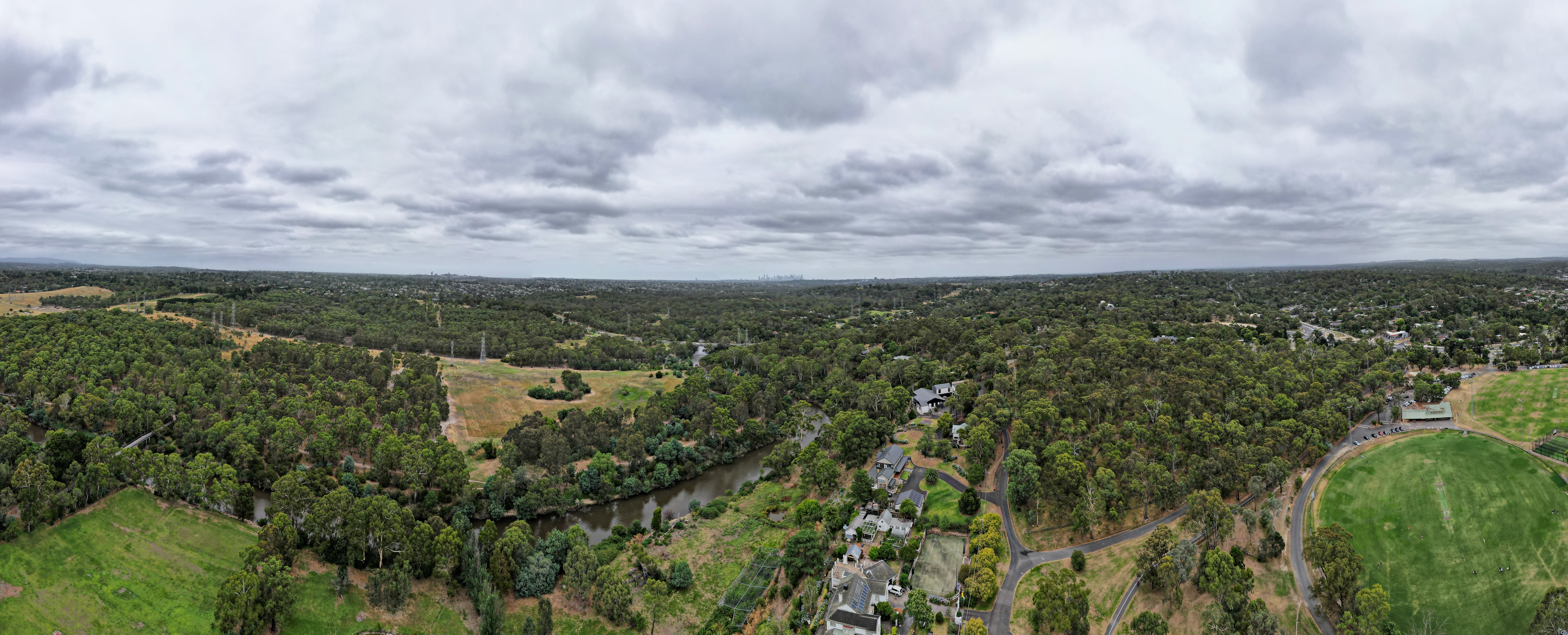
The park with the Melbourne city skyline on the horizon

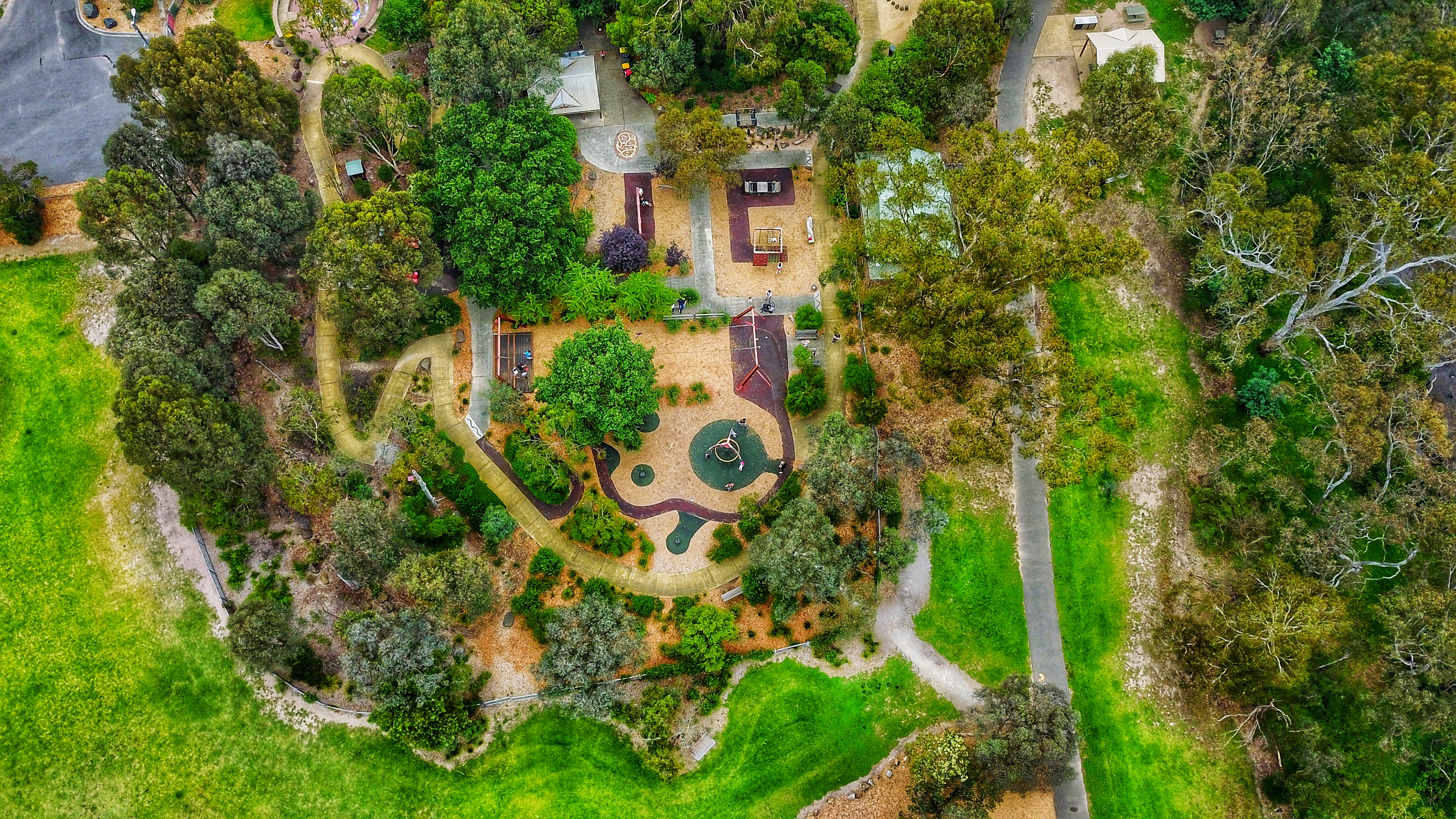
Aerial view of the nature playground at Wombat Bend Park, west of the park

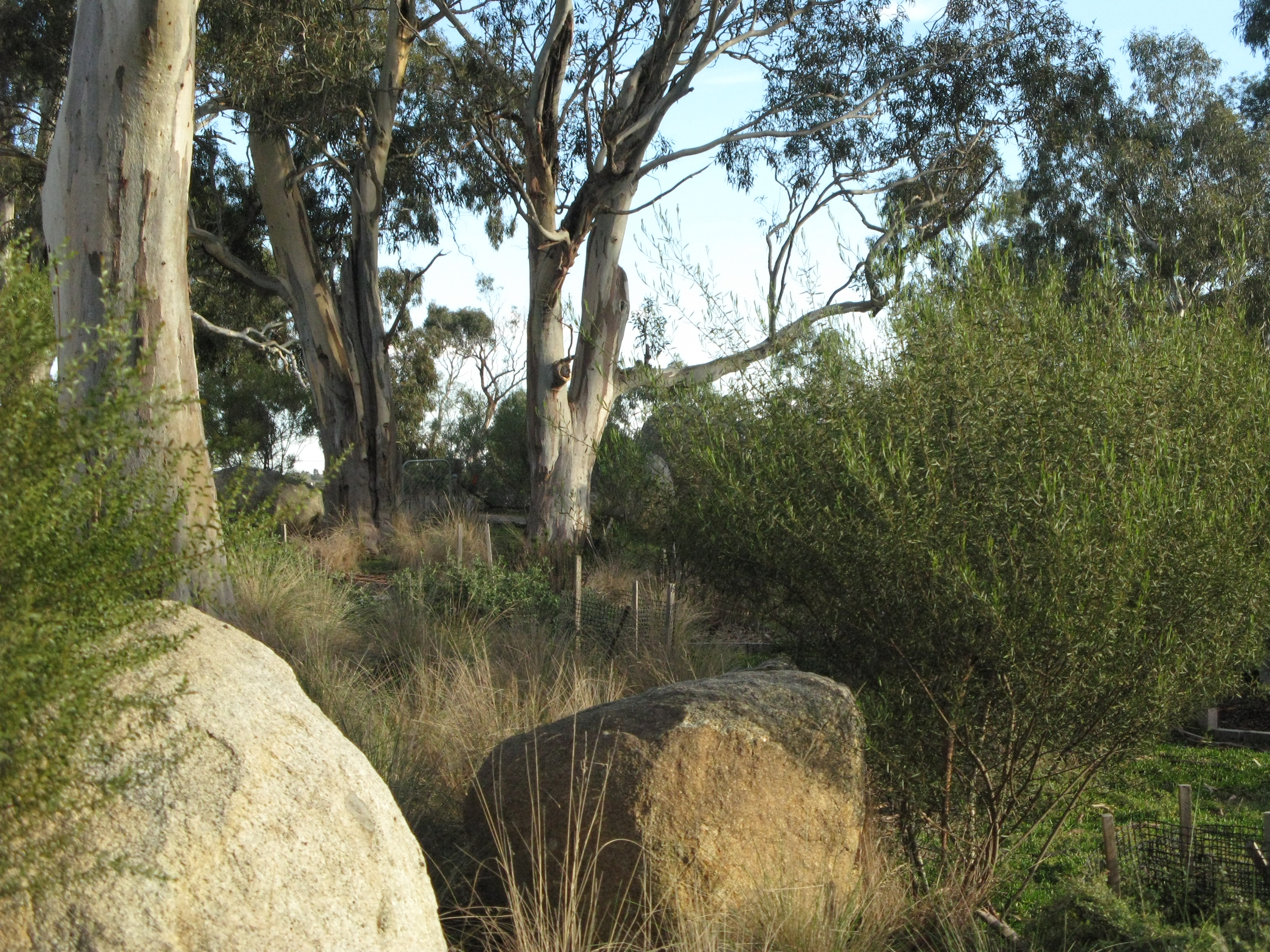
Revegetation in 2009, planted in 2004

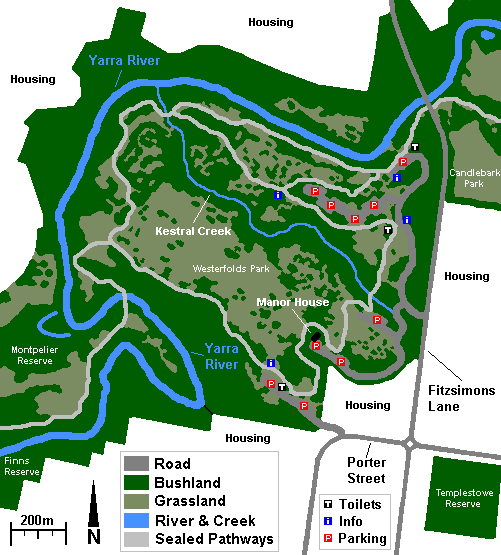
Map of the park

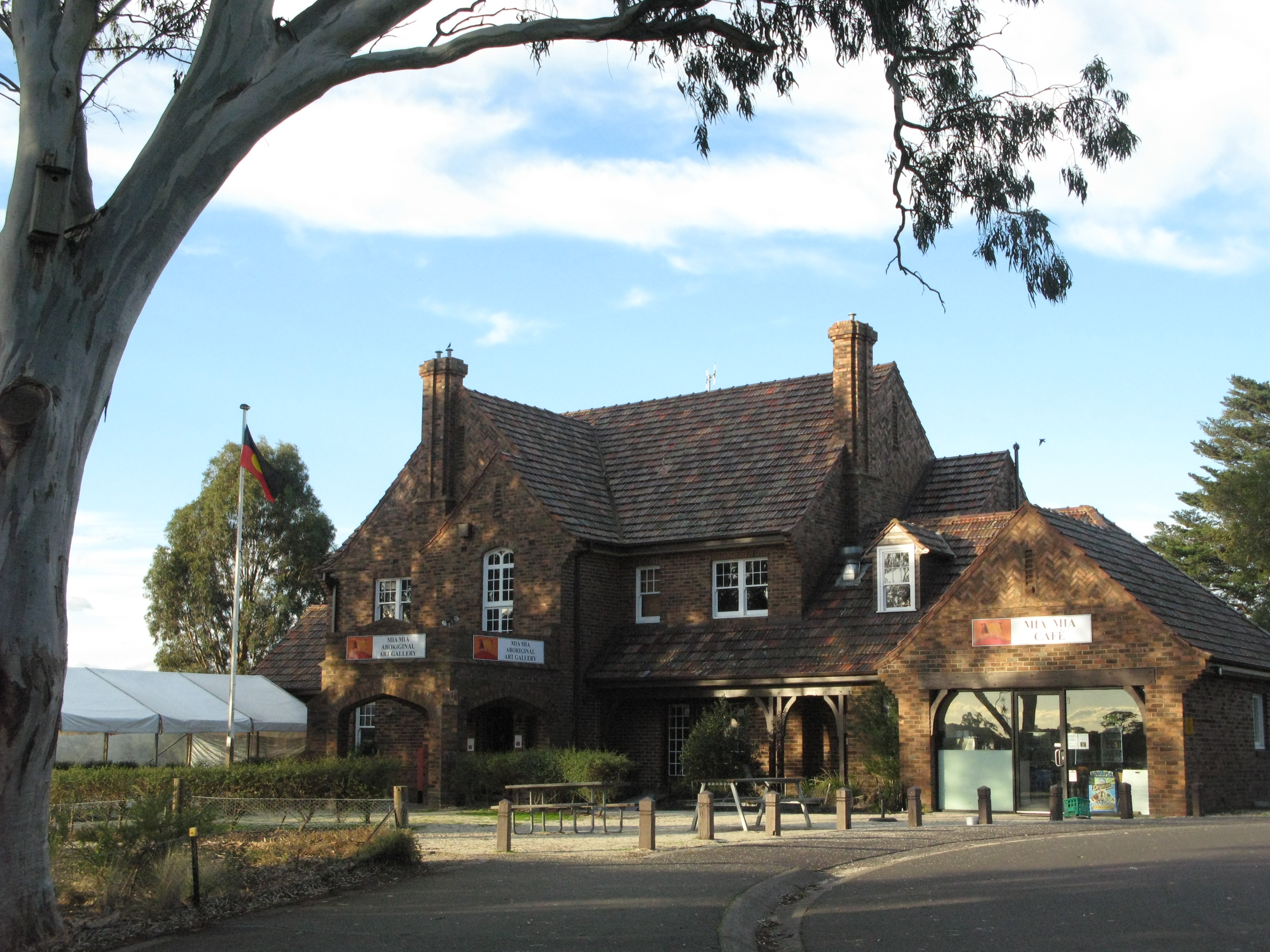
Manor House, main facade

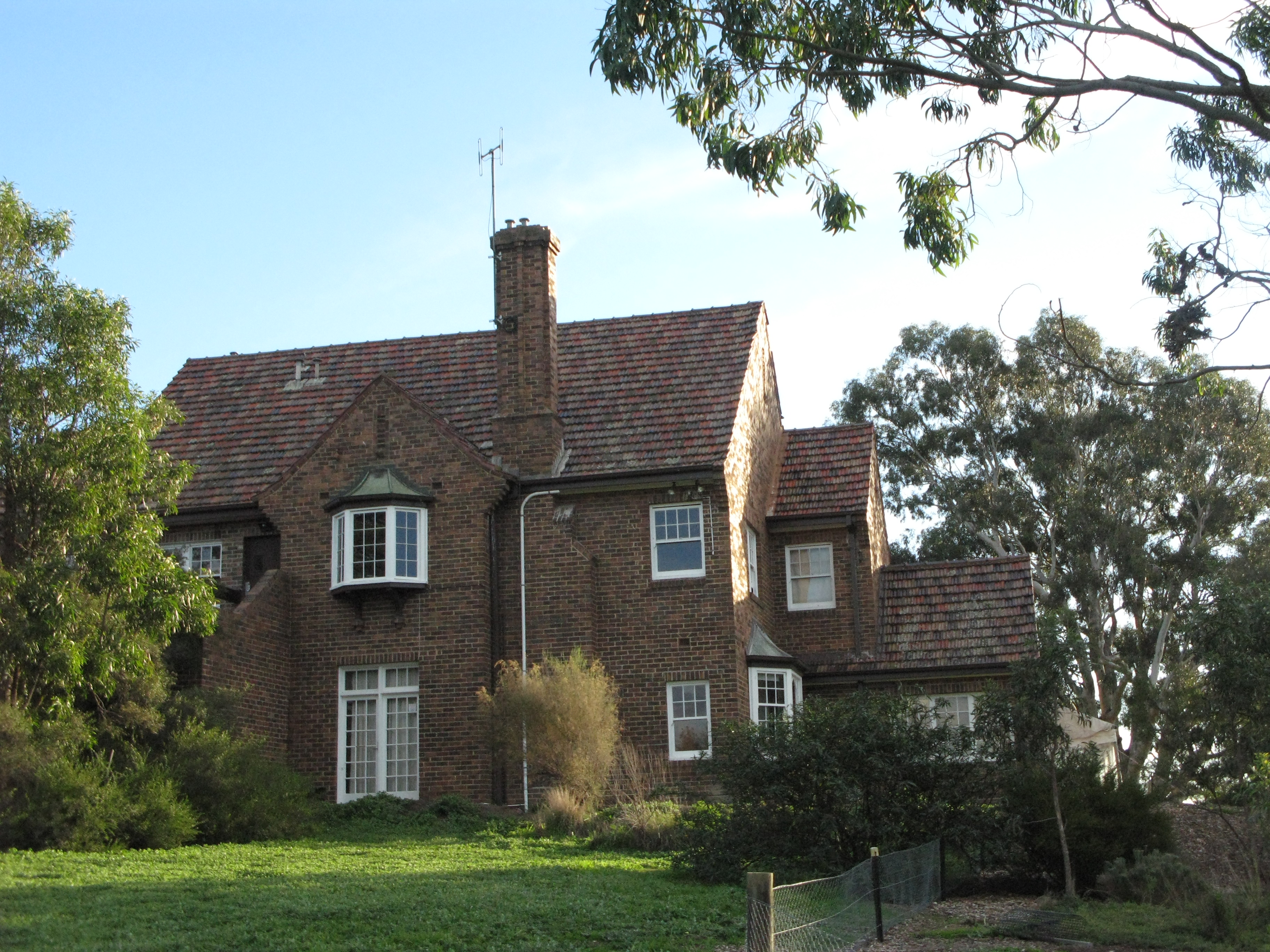
Manor House, from the east

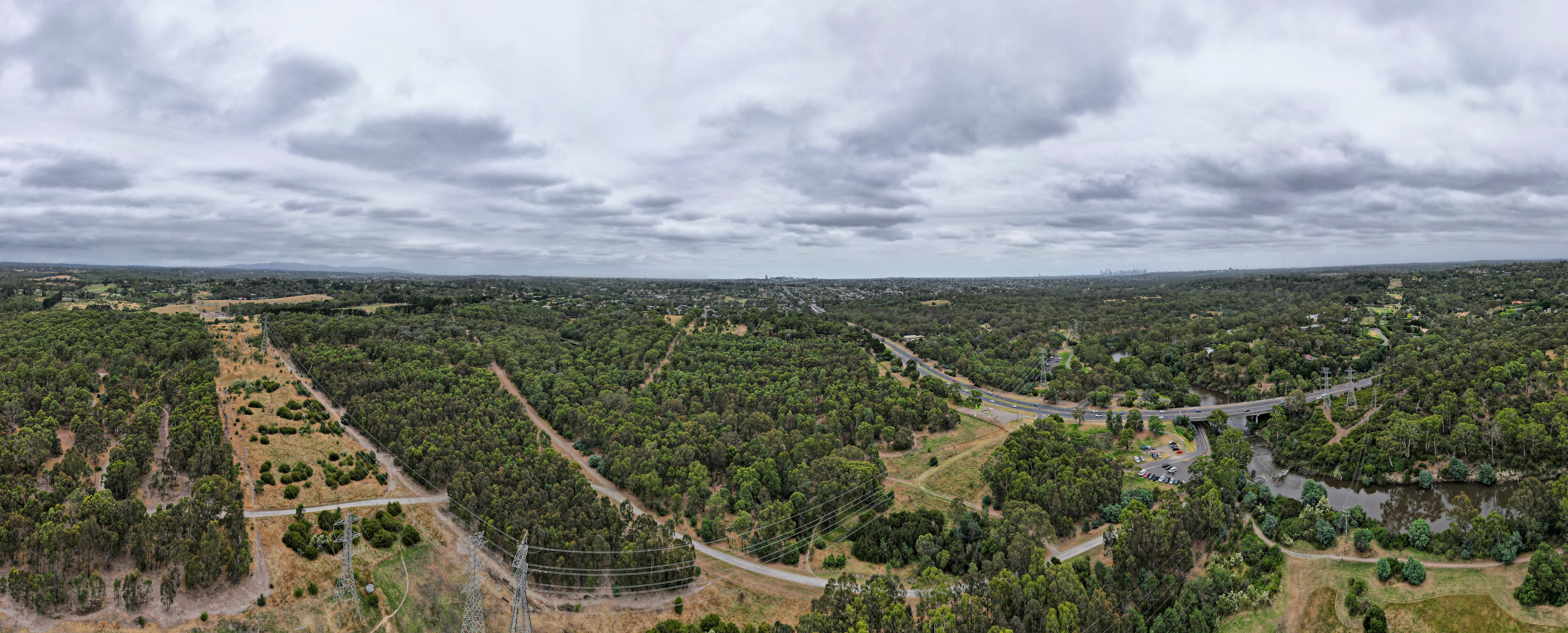
Aerial view of Candlebark Park alongside Fitzsimmons Reserve

== See also ==
- Parks and gardens of Melbourne
- Heritage gardens in Australia
- List of heritage-listed buildings in Melbourne
