= Lower Plenty, Victoria =

Lower Plenty Melbourne, Victoria
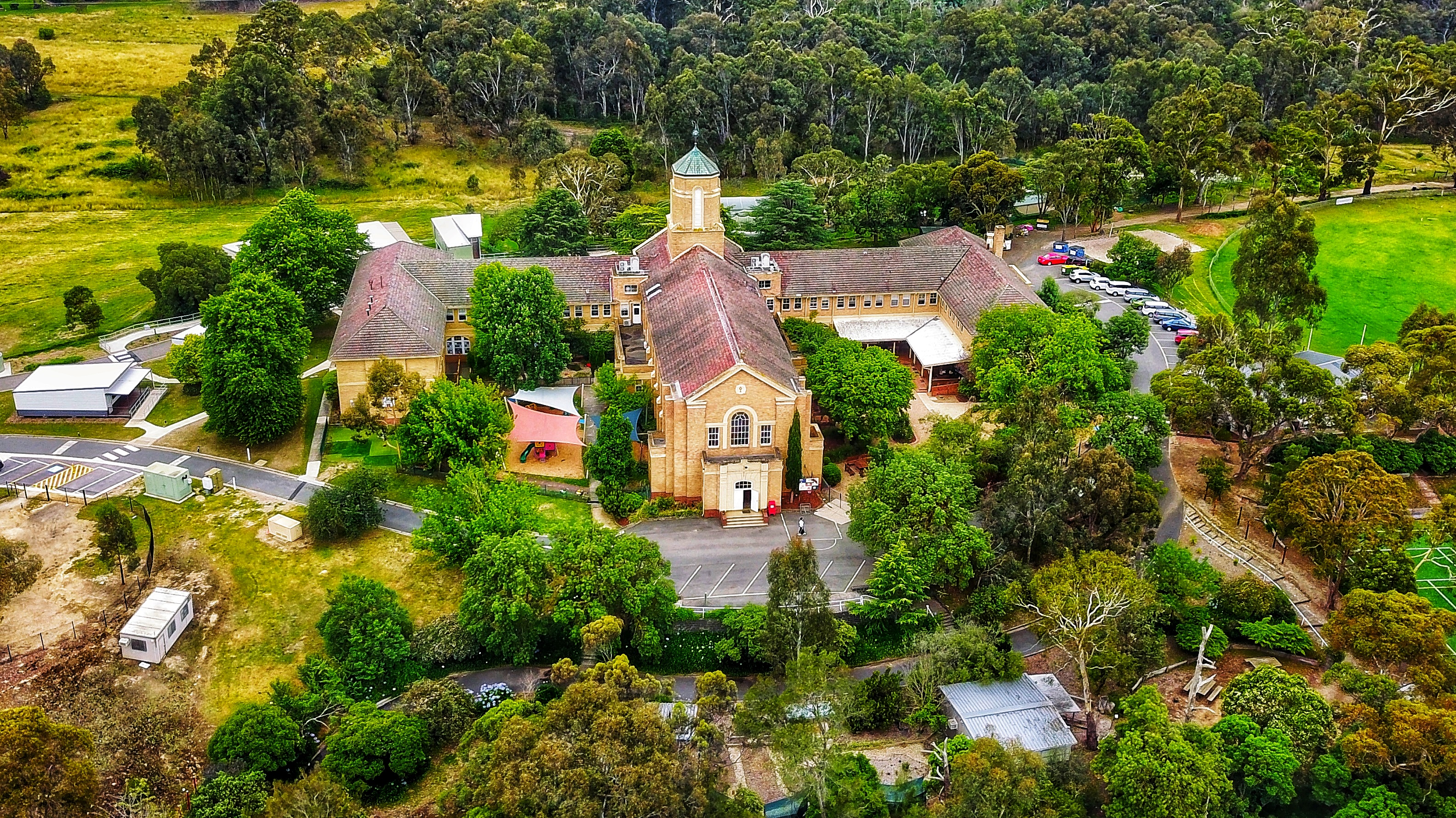
- Aerial view of Odyssey House at Lower Plenty along the Yarra Main Trail

- Coordinates: 37.734°S 145.116°E
- Population: 3,962 (2021 census)
  - Density: 574/km^{2} (1,487/sq mi)
- Postcode(s): 3093
- Area: 6.9 km^{2} (2.7 sq mi)
- Location: 21 km (13 mi) from Melbourne
- LGA(s): City of Banyule
- State electorate(s): Eltham
- Federal division(s): Jagajaga
Suburbs around Lower Plenty:
Yallambie	Montmorency	Eltham
Viewbank	Lower Plenty	Eltham
Templestowe Lower	Templestowe	Templestowe

Lower Plenty is a suburb of Melbourne, Victoria, Australia, 16 km north-east from Melbourne's Central Business District, located within the City of Banyule local government area. Lower Plenty recorded a population of 3,962 at the 2021 census.

Lower Plenty, in earlier times part of Eltham, almost certainly got its name from the Lower Plenty Toll Bridge, built in 1860 to collect tolls across the Plenty River. This bluestone bridge still stands as part of the Lower Plenty Trail. A report of a court case, in The Argus newspaper, dated 1 May 1879, reveals two lads, Corkhill and Hodgson, "broke the windows of the old tollhouse, Lower Plenty bridge", some 19 years after the bridge was built.

The suburb is bounded by the Plenty River in the west until it joins the Yarra River, which forms the southern boundary. Fitzsimons Lane forms the eastern boundary and Airlie Road north of Main Road (a continuation of Lower Plenty Road from the west) forms the northern boundary.

== History ==
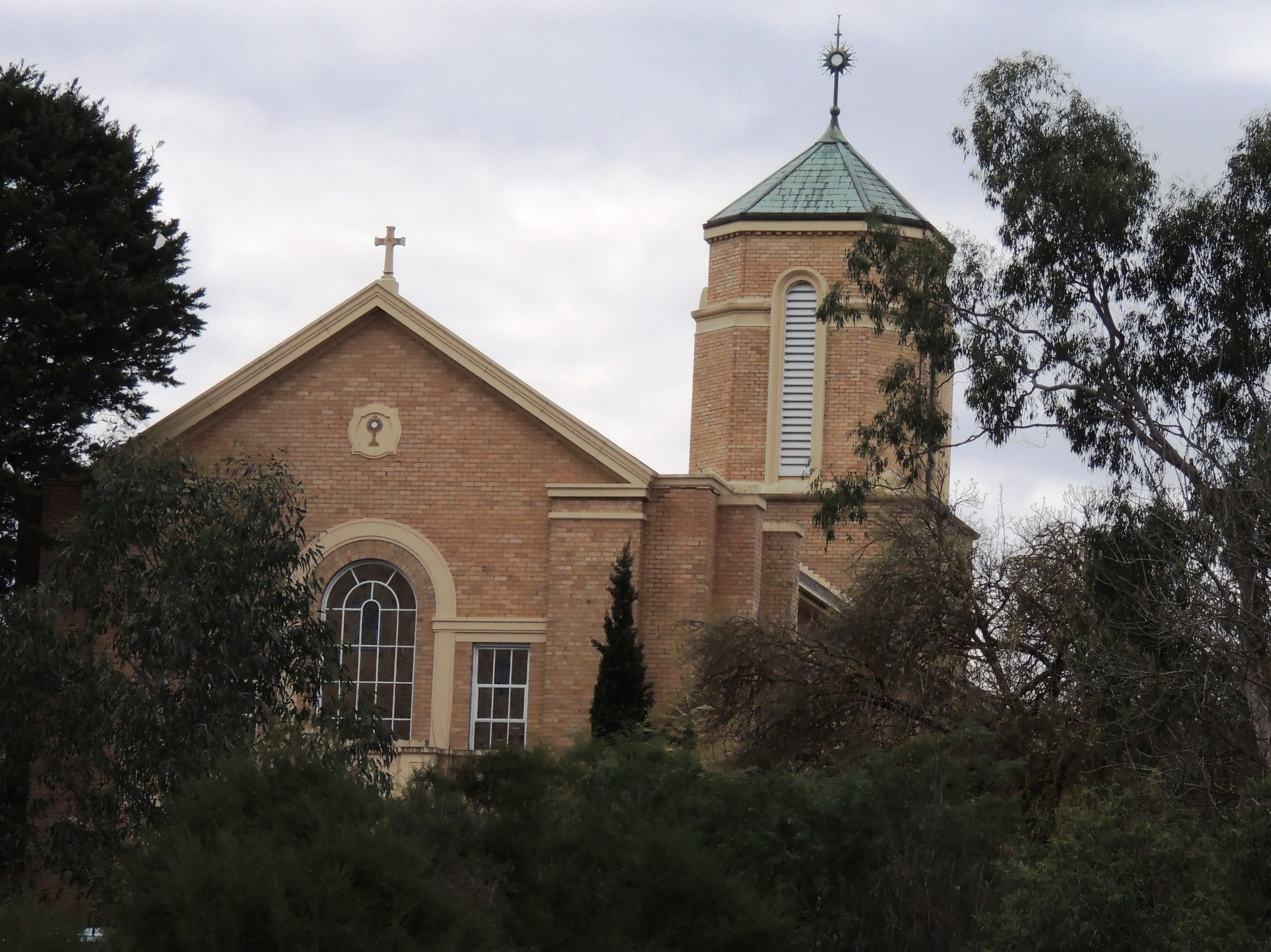
Odyssey house in Lower Plenty

In February 1855 Hungarian immigrant Sigismund Wekey purchased 211 acres (0.85 km^{2}) in what is now Lower Plenty, via The Victoria Vineyard and Garden Fruit Company of which he was manager, with a vision to start a wine industry in the new settlement of Melbourne.

In March 1855, Wekey held a meeting at the Bulleen Hotel and called for shareholders, each "according to his means", for a proposed toll bridge, the first bridge ever built over the Upper Yarra, joining Lower Plenty to Templestowe, and replacing a punt being operated by the company. The bridge would cut five kilometres off the trip from the Eltham township to Melbourne, it was claimed at the meeting.

A plan, backed by a group of Melbourne businessmen who would form the 'Templestowe Bridge Committee', attracted the necessary shareholders and the project was underway. Colonial Architect of the day, James Balmain did the design as a private commission, engineers and builders were Allott and Greenwood. The foundation stone, laid by John Hodgson M.L.C., on 18 August 1855, concealed a manuscript giving details of the ceremony.

The bridge would have a span of 43 metres and a width of eight metres. It would cost £2200 English Pounds (AU$450,000 in 2022 dollars). It would be located at the end of what is now Bonds Road, Lower Plenty, the land for this road being donated by local landowners John Seymour and David Bell, and the Central Road Board agreed to level the road to the bridge on the Templestowe side through the estate of Henry Stooke.

Meantime Wekey conceived a plan for another bridge at Studley Park to improve and shorten the trip to the city even further. By 21 September the plan for this second bridge was underway.

A stoppage in the works of the Templestowe Bridge was explained by Wekey on 22 September, as being a dispute between the Board and the contractors over payment when the foundation on the Lower Plenty side was found to be different from expected, causing a change in the design – the contractors were wanting more money to accommodate this.

Unfortunately in January 1856 the Victoria Vineyard and Garden Fruit Company was forced to sell its land. The sale was to Mr King for eight English Pounds an acre – the land had been acquired originally for £4.60 English Pounds an acre – but Wekey had been confident it would soon be worth £18-20 English Pounds per acre. The company was to be wound up shortly after.

It appears the Templestowe Bridge was operating by this time.

In March 1862, a deputation of Eltham residents approached the Commissioner of Railways and Roads, requesting the government to buy the Templestowe Bridge then give it back to the Eltham District Road Board, as while its toll earning capability was not as "remunerative" as had been hoped, the bridge was a "great public convenience". The request was denied.

In October 1863 there was a great flood causing the Yarra to rise 12 metres. It even flooded Elizabeth Street in Melbourne's Central Business District. A number of bridges were washed away.

In March 1865 another deputation this time of Templestowe residents to the Acting Commissioner of Roads and Bridges, offered £600 English Pounds raised by them towards a new bridge to replace the Templestowe Bridge and requested a government grant towards the cost. The Acting Commissioner "promised to give the matter further consideration" though he did not see "from what fund a sum of money could be granted to them".

A repair job was carried out in 1873 and 1874.

There were several more large floods, notably in October 1923, when the Templestowe Bridge, "a solid wooden structure on an iron girder, with stone supports" almost washed away again. The bridge also appears to have survived the significant December 1934 flood as it is mentioned in a news article in The Argus newspaper in February 1935. No other references have yet been discovered (regretfully no picture of Templestowe Bridge has been found and most residents don't even know a bridge was there).

The last 'bits' of the Templestowe Bridge, joining Bonds Road, Lower Plenty to Finns Reserve at Thompson's Road, Templestowe, finally washed away in the 1960s.

Around 1855 another bridge was built in what is now Lower Plenty but over the Plenty River. The Lower Plenty Toll Bridge, referred to above, bluestone blocks and steel, still stands today and is part of the Plenty River Trail, close to the Heidelberg Golf Club and the Lower Plenty Hotel. It is possible that the Templestowe Bridge was similar in appearance to this.

'The Lower Plenty School' opened in 1876. At the time this area was part of Eltham.

Lower Plenty Post Office opened around 1902.

== Today ==
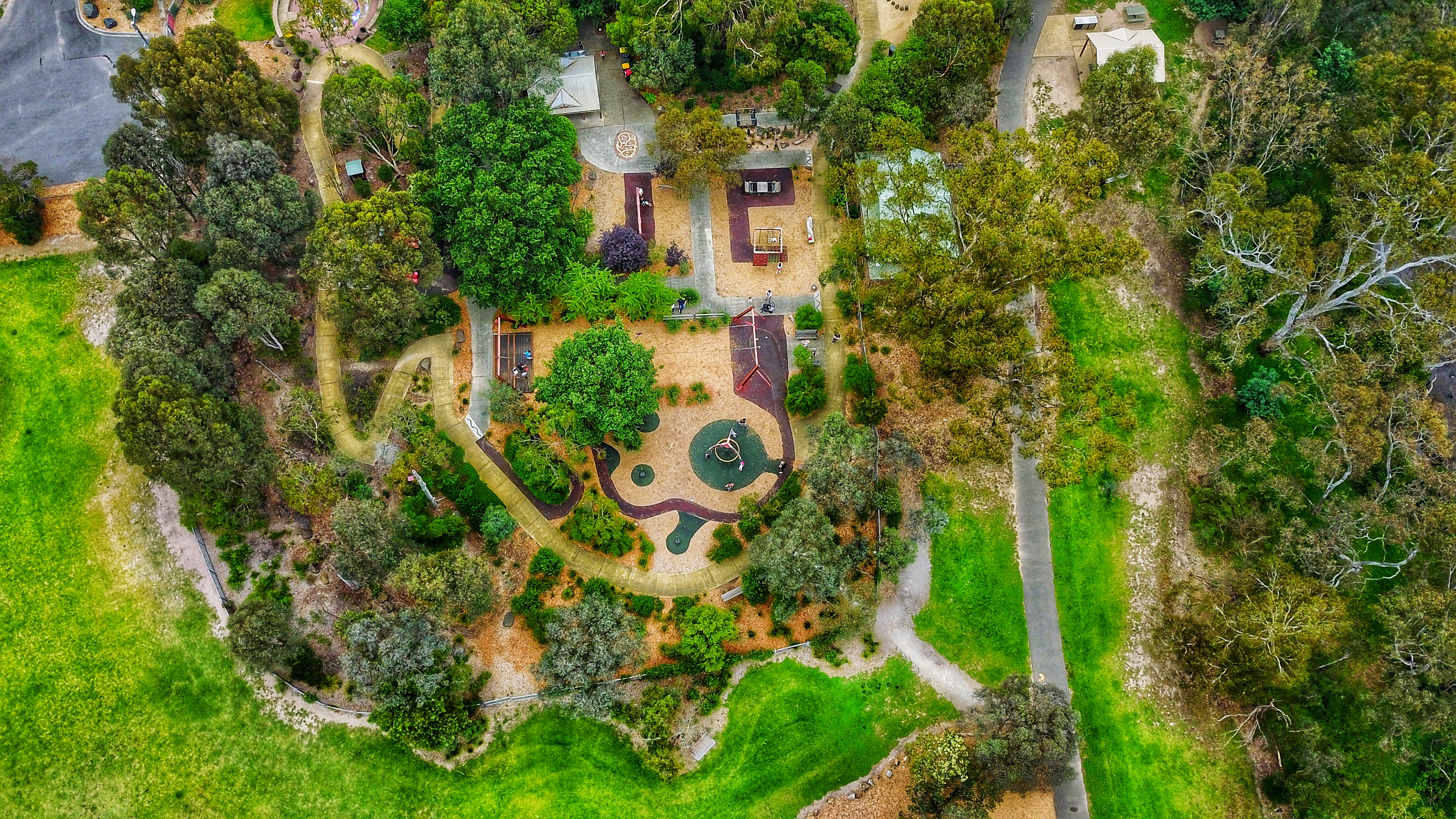
Topdown of the nature playground at Wombat Bend Park along the Yarra Main trail

Lower Plenty has a low density of urban dwellings compared to nearby suburbs, and is dominated by large homesteads that are built away from the main roads. These houses sharply contrast with the relatively undeveloped roads (some unsealed) and infrastructure of the area.

Outstanding natural features of Lower Plenty are the Yarra and Plenty Rivers. These are complemented by the Main Yarra Trail and the Plenty River Trail cycling and walking tracks, exposing the beauty of the rivers in a bushland setting, while joining Lower Plenty to the City and Docklands in one direction and in other directions to Greensborough and Montmorency, but also to Templestowe and Doncaster. Thus residents and visitors can enjoy the natural landscape of Lower Plenty knowing they also have offroad access via many lovely nature trails to all parts of the CBD and to the state public transport network. These natural features and bicycle/walking infrastructure are clearly shown in Banyule City's freely available Travel Map.

The built-up features of Lower Plenty are the Heidelberg Golf Club, the Lower Plenty Hotel, the distinctive radio masts that rise above Bonds Road, and the Christian Brothers "Amberley" Retreat Centre on Amberley Way, home of the Edmund Rice Camps.

Lower Plenty also has a primary school, on the main road as well as a scout hall along Para Road. Also a baseball club is located at Glenauburn reserve.

== Sport ==
The Lower Plenty Football and Cricket Clubs are located in nearby Montmorency, at Montmorency Park, on Para Road. Since 1995 the Lower Plenty Football Club (the Bears) have played in the Diamond Valley Football League (now the Northern Football League), after playing and winning a Premiership in the Panton Hill and District Football League during the 1980s. A victory after the siren in the 2018 Grand Final put Lower Plenty back into the Division 1 competition.

Golfers play at the course of the Rosanna Golf Club on Cleveland Avenue, or at the course of the Heidelberg Golf Club on Main Road.

== See also ==
- Shire of Eltham – Lower Plenty was previously within this former local government area.
