= Yarra Bend Park =

Park in Melbourne, Australia

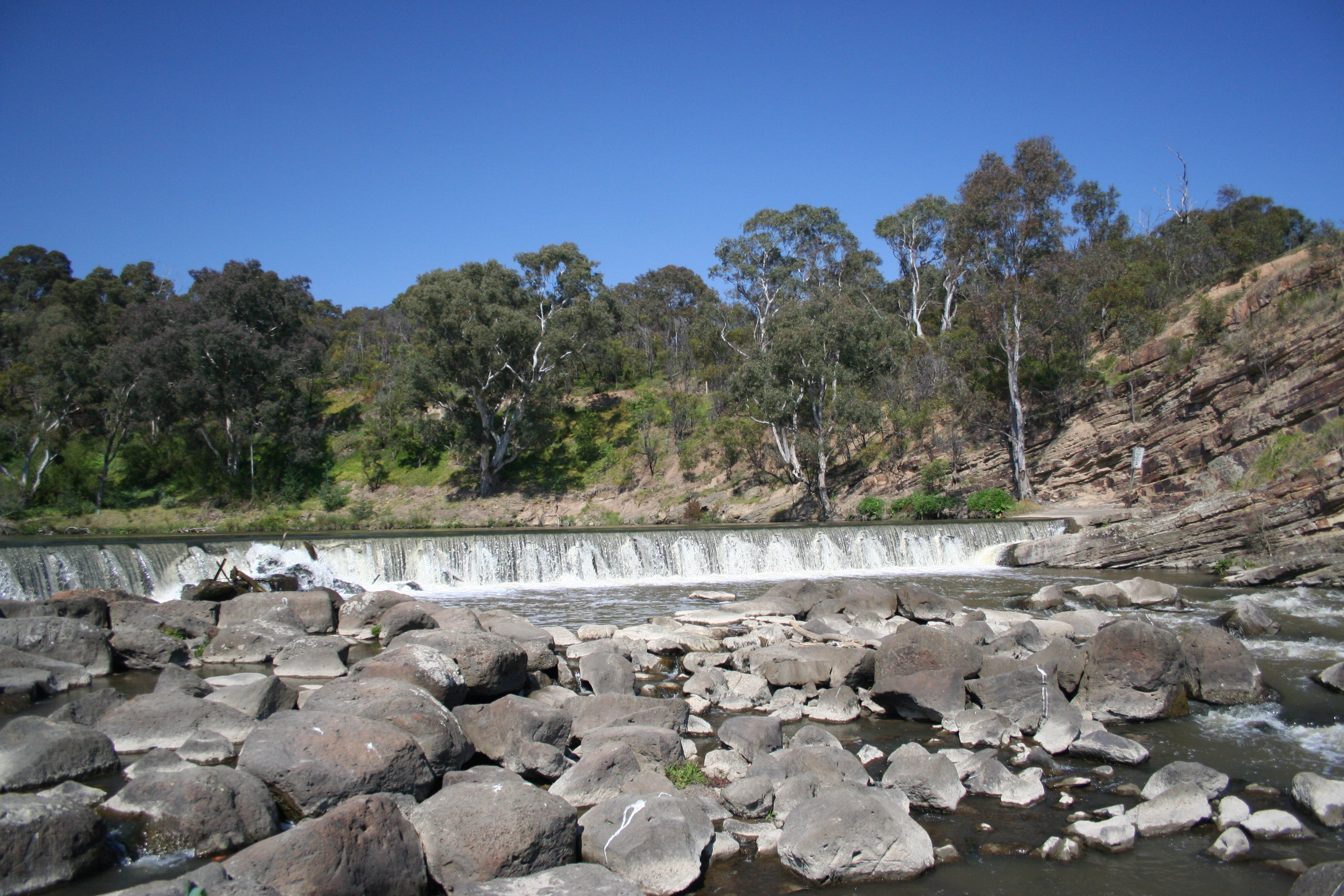
- Dights Falls, located in the park

- Location within Melbourne
- Interactive map of Yarra Bend Park
- Type: Metropolitan park
- Location: Kew and Fairfield, Melbourne, Victoria, Australia
- Coordinates: 37°47′43″S 145°00′43″E
- Area: 260 ha (640 acres)
- Created: 1877; 149 years ago
- Operator: Parks Victoria
- Visitors: 1.5 million
- Open: All year; 24 hours
- Status: Open
- Public transit: –; –; –; – Capital City Trail, Main Yarra Trail
- Landmarks: Dights Falls Mill; Walmer Street Bridge
- Facilities: Barbecues; fly-casting pool; picnic areas; sports grounds; toilets

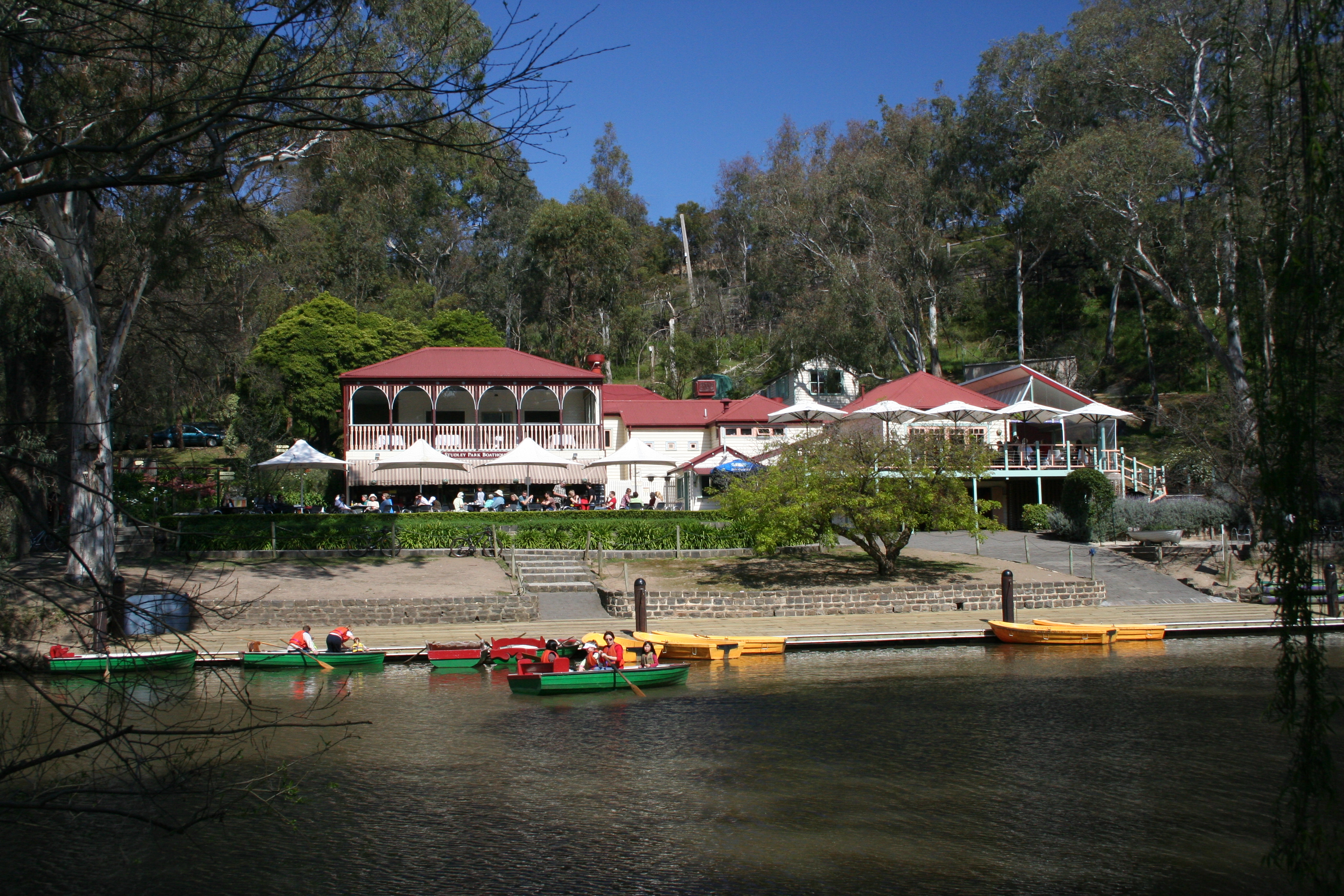
Studley Park Boathouse on the Yarra River

The Yarra Bend Park is a 260-hectare (640-acre) metropolitan park located in Kew and Fairfield, inner east suburbs of Melbourne, in Victoria, Australia. Situated 4 kilometres (2.5 mi) northeast of the city centre of Melbourne, the park is the largest area of remnant natural bushland in inner Melbourne.

The most notable feature of the park is the Yarra River which flows through the park for approximately 12 kilometres (7.5 mi). The park hosts two golf courses, two historic boathouses, sheds and a number of cycle and walking trails. Approximately 1.5 million people visit the park on an annual basis. The park is located on the traditional lands of the Wurundjeri.

Within the park are the Dights Falls, its associated mill site and the nearby Walmer Street Bridge, with the mill (1982) and the bridge (2021) added to the Victorian Heritage Register in recognition of their historical significance.

== History ==
The location of the park at the confluence of the Yarra River and Merri Creek. The area has traditionally been an important site for the Wurundjeri Indigenous people, commemorated by the Koori Garden on the western edge of the park, near Dights Falls. The park was officially reserved in 1877, and in 1929 it joined with Studley Park to the south to cover the whole of the area today. From 1848 until 1925 the park was home to Yarra Bend Lunatic Asylum, which took up most of the area of the park with buildings, vegetable gardens and a cemetery.

In 1904, the Queen's Memorial Infectious Diseases Hospital was established along Yarra Bend Road, Fairfield. Later simply known as "Fairfield Hospital", it closed in 1996. The southern portion of the site now accommodates the Thomas Embling Hospital, opened by the Victorian Institute of Forensic Mental Health in April 2000, with the majority of the buildings in the northern portion converted for use by NMIT Fairfield.

The Mission of St James and St John opened a Venereal Disease Clinic named "Fairhaven" in 1927 on the northern section of land previously occupied by the Yarra Bend Asylum, including the asylum's main buildings. The clinic closed in 1951 and the site was temporarily used by the adjacent Fairfield Hospital as staff quarters and storerooms.

In 1953, the former "Fairhaven" site was acquired by the Prisons Division for conversion into a female prison. HM Prison Fairlea was officially opened in 1956 and closed in August 1996.

In 1972 the Eastern Freeway was constructed through the middle of the park, crossing both the Merri Creek and the [arra River. Parts of the Yarra were relocated and the Deep Rock Basin was completely demolished. This was highly controversial at the time, heightened by the destruction of rich history of not only Wurundjeri origin but European as well.

== Features ==
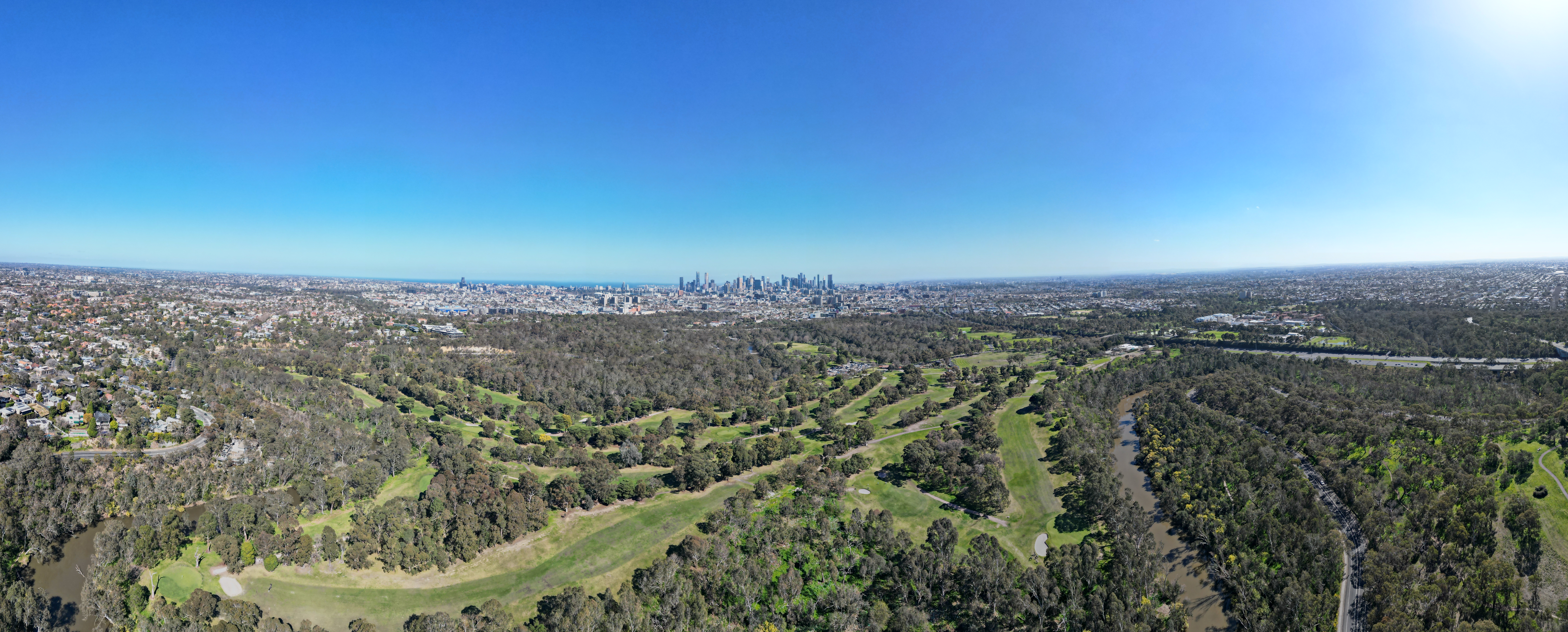
Aerial panorama of Yarra Bend Park facing Melbourne

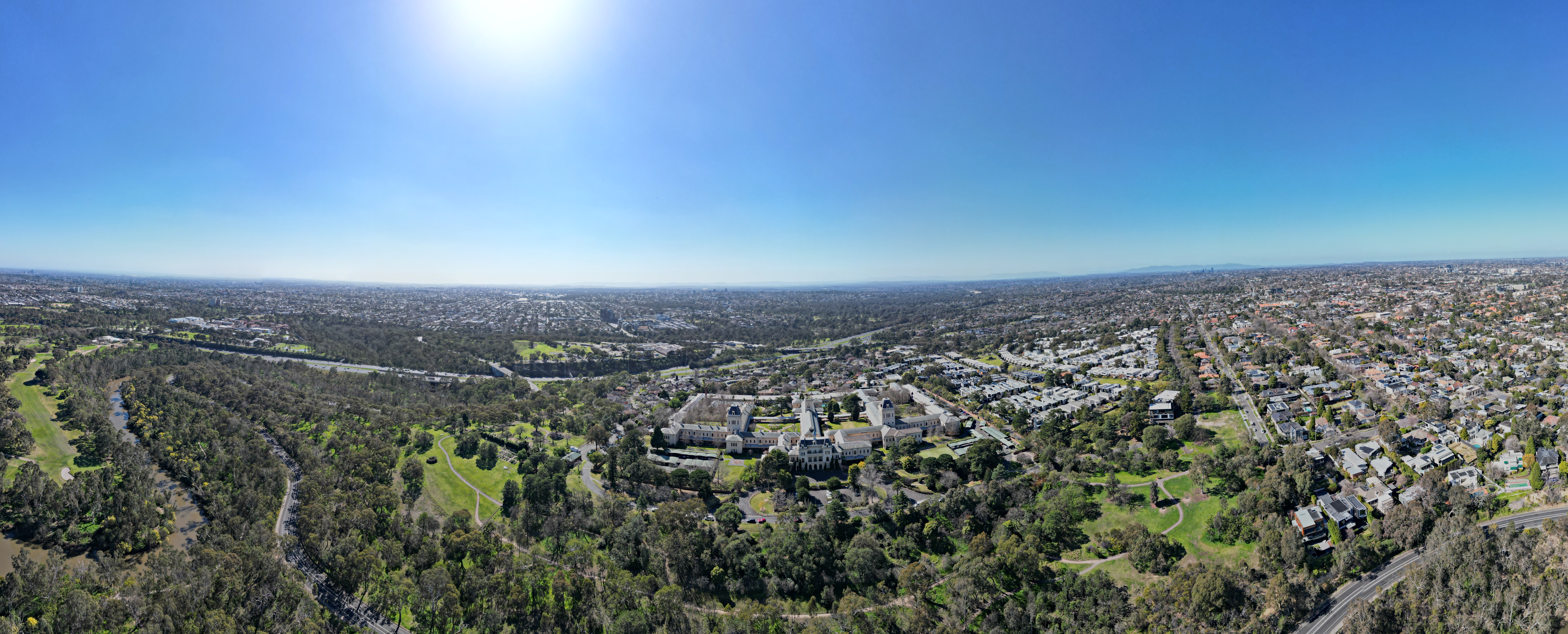
Aerial panorama of Yarra Bend Park facing the Willsmere

There are a number of shared use tracks for cyclists and pedestrians. The Capital City Trail and Yarra River Trail both pass through the park. Organised bushwalking and birdwatching tours are available and there is even a tour to the flying fox colony. Some areas of the park are designated dog exclusion zones, and dogs can be walked in on-lead and off-lead zones. Canoes and boats can be hired from the Studley Park Boathouse.

There are a number of sports grounds including the Corben Oval, W.T. Long Oval, Sir Herbert Olney Oval, Westfield South Oval and Westfield North Oval. The Fairlea West Oval, Fairlea East Oval and W.J. Cox Oval synthetic pitches can be hired for social matches.

There are several picnic areas with electric barbecues and toilets. Westfield, North Rotunda and South Rotunda shelters close to picnic facilities can be hired, as can the grassed picnic areas at Deep Rock and Loop Road. Studley Park and Bellbird picnic areas are also available for public use. Fishing is excluded within the flying fox colony zone at Bellbird picnic area.

In 1978, a world class fly-casting pool was installed beside the Fairlea East Oval. Regular fly casting tournaments, local and intrastate take place here particularly during the winter months.

Kane's Bridge and several other bridges are located in the park, spanning over the Yarra River.

The Studley parkrun has been conducted in the park every Saturday since 2016.

== Wildlife and flora ==
The park is home to many species of birds, bats and other mammals, reptiles (tiger snakes and blue tongued lizards are common) insects and fish (esp. carp and eels) also regularly found are rainbow lorikeets, red-rumped parrots and yellow-tailed black cockatoos, water rats and brush-tail and ringtail possums.

Yarra Bend Park is also home to a colony of federally and state listed vulnerable grey-headed flying foxes. The colony took up residence in the Royal Botanic Gardens in 1986 but were relocated to the more natural setting of Yarra Bend Park in 2003. The population is nomadic and migratory and varies in size from 3000 (winter) to 30,000 (summer). The protected bats pollinate and disperse the seeds of native trees. The colony roosts in native hardwoods and can easily be seen from the lookout at Bellbird Picnic Reserve. The evening flyout is a fascinating wildlife event.

In April 2020, local Victorian MP Tim Smith made a public call for the bat colony to be "moved away", because "people and bats don't mix" following the outbreak Coronavirus in Australia. The scientific basis for this claim remains unclear. In response, one of Australia's leading bat experts described calls for the colony to be relocated or culled as "ridiculous".

The Yarra Bend Park is Melbourne's largest natural bushland park and features river escarpments, grassy woodland and formal gardens and grounds. The critically endangered Eucalyptus ×studleyensis is a natural hybrid between Eucalyptus camaldulensis and Eucalyptus ovata and was named after the early specimens collected in the park.

== See also ==
- Protected areas of Victoria
- Dights Falls
