= Bike paths in Melbourne =

Cycling routes and cycling lanes in Melbourne, Australia

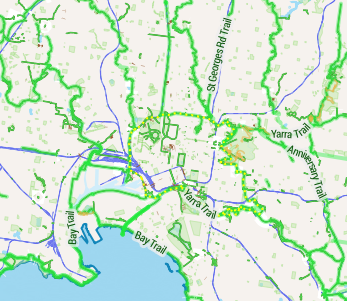
The innermost part of the Melbourne bike network.

Bicycle paths around Melbourne are off-road routes for use by people riding bicycles and walking. These have been developed over many decades and primarily follow current or former watercourses and major roads to traverse long distances and provide facilities for transport and recreation.

Paths within the metropolitan area are typically sealed surfaces but gravel or dirt sections are also present. Paths often connect together to provide continuous routes and can also sometimes accessed from railway stations.

Ongoing community campaigns, such as those of Bicycle Network, have resulted in some expansion and improvement of the network.

== History ==
Off-road bicycle paths have existed in Melbourne for many decades. The first designations as 'shared user paths' (SUPs) - or 'shared footways' - began in the 1970s following extensive lobbying by Bicycle Victoria and its founder Keith Dunstan.

What is today known as the Main Yarra Trail was built in the late 1970s as part of this work, although not to the full original plans. Its route ended at the MacRobertson Bridge rather than continue along the Yarra River to Hawthorn. Other suburban paths, such as the Blind Creek Trail and Maribyrnong River Trail, were built and subsequently expanded through to the 1980s by the Ministry of Transport under the State Bicycle Committee - a dedicated group to advocate for and plan for cycling in Victoria.

In 1976, the Ministry of Transport under Minister Brian Dixon developed Victoria's first statewide bicycle strategy. This later included the 'Melbourne Bikeway Plan' published in 1981 that planned for a network of bicycle paths and routes that mostly focused on off-road paths and trails. This Plan delivered sections of the:

- Main Yarra Trail
- Merri Creek Trail
- Gardiners Creek Trail
- Scotchmans Creek Trail
- Moonee Ponds Creek Trail
- Blind Creek Trail
- Bay Trail

The system set up in these plans continued a programme whereby the State Government would provide funding to local governments to design and construct new bicycle paths. Many new and upgraded trails were built in this period using this method.

In 1988, the State Bicycle Committee was abolished and subsequently absorbed into the newly created Victorian Roads Corporation.

== Usage ==
In 2006, VicRoads installed bicycle counters on the trails at 17 locations throughout inner Melbourne. These counters provide data on the usage of Melbourne's trails. For example, the Anniversary Outer Circle Trail at Cotham Rd, Kew, has about 20 cyclists per hour throughout the day, whereas the Yarra River Trail, on the north side of Morell Bridge, has a distinct peak hour rate of about 250/hr but only 50/hr in non-peak periods. This supports the observation that the former is used mainly for recreation and the latter for recreation and commuting.

== Bike paths along freeways ==
A number of freeways have been constructed with separate bicycle paths built alongside, including Eastlink, the Deer Park Bypass, and the Metropolitan Ring Road. However, the CityLink tollway system has no provision for cyclists along several sections, including the Bolte Bridge. Cyclists are also excluded from riding the West Gate Freeway over the West Gate Bridge, although exceptions are made for some special bicycle events like Around the Bay in a Day organised by Bicycle Network.

== Planning and maintenance ==
Responsibility for planning and maintenance is split between various State Government authorities and local councils. With the increased recognition from all levels of government of the benefits of cycling, Melbourne today has a network of shared bicycle trails which have developed over time along its river and creek systems and alongside freeways and railways.

== Future expansion ==
In December 2008, the Victorian State Government released their Victorian Transport Plan which budgeted $100 million for cycling over 12 years. In 2009, the Victorian Cycling Strategy was also released, however, the Victorian Auditor-General reviewed this Strategy in 2012 and found there had been almost no progress on the items in the plan, which included more cycle lanes and junction treatments, and that it had been sidelined by the new Liberal government. In 2012 there was opposition from cyclists following the cancellation of most cycling projects from the State budget, with protests organised by Bicycle Network Victoria.

The Parks Victoria recommends expanding the trails.

Development of the network is slowed by the number of agencies that may be involved when a new path is proposed. Such agencies could include VicRoads, VicTrack, Parks Victoria, Melbourne Water and the local Councils. The network is fragmented along Council boundaries. Some examples are:

- St Georges Rd Trail at the boundary of Darebin and Whittlesea
- Gardiners Creek gap at the boundary of Boroondara, Stonnington and Monash
- Termination of the East Malvern Station to Centre Rd Trail at the boundary of Monash and Kingston

== See also ==
- Cycling in Melbourne
- Cycling in Victoria
- Category:Bike paths in Melbourne
- Category:Rail trails in Australia
