= Upfield Bike Path =

Bike path along Upfield railway line

Upfield Rail Trail
- The Upfield Bike Path in Brunswick
- Length: Approx 8.6 km
- Location: Melbourne, Victoria, Australia
- Difficulty: Easy
- Hazards: Numerous Road crossings. People exiting stations. Forklifts.
- Surface: Bitumen path
- Hills: Flat
- Train: Upfield railway line

The Upfield Shared Path is a shared use path for cyclists and pedestrians, which follows Upfield railway line through the inner northern suburbs of Melbourne, Victoria, Australia.

It stretches from Princes Park, through Brunswick and Coburg, to the Western Ring Road Trail in Glenroy. It was originally opened in the late 1980s.

Missing links have been progressively filled with the work between Hope Street and Anstey railway station in Brunswick completed in August 2002. A section between Reynard and O'Hea Streets in Coburg with a signalled crossing at Bell Street was completed by 2006 by City of Moreland (now City of Merri-bek) Council and VicRoads. An extension to Box Forest Road was completed in September 2008. The path was further extended to meet the Western Ring Road Trail in October 2026.

An interactive map of the trail as well as others in the Melbourne area is available here.

== Following the path ==
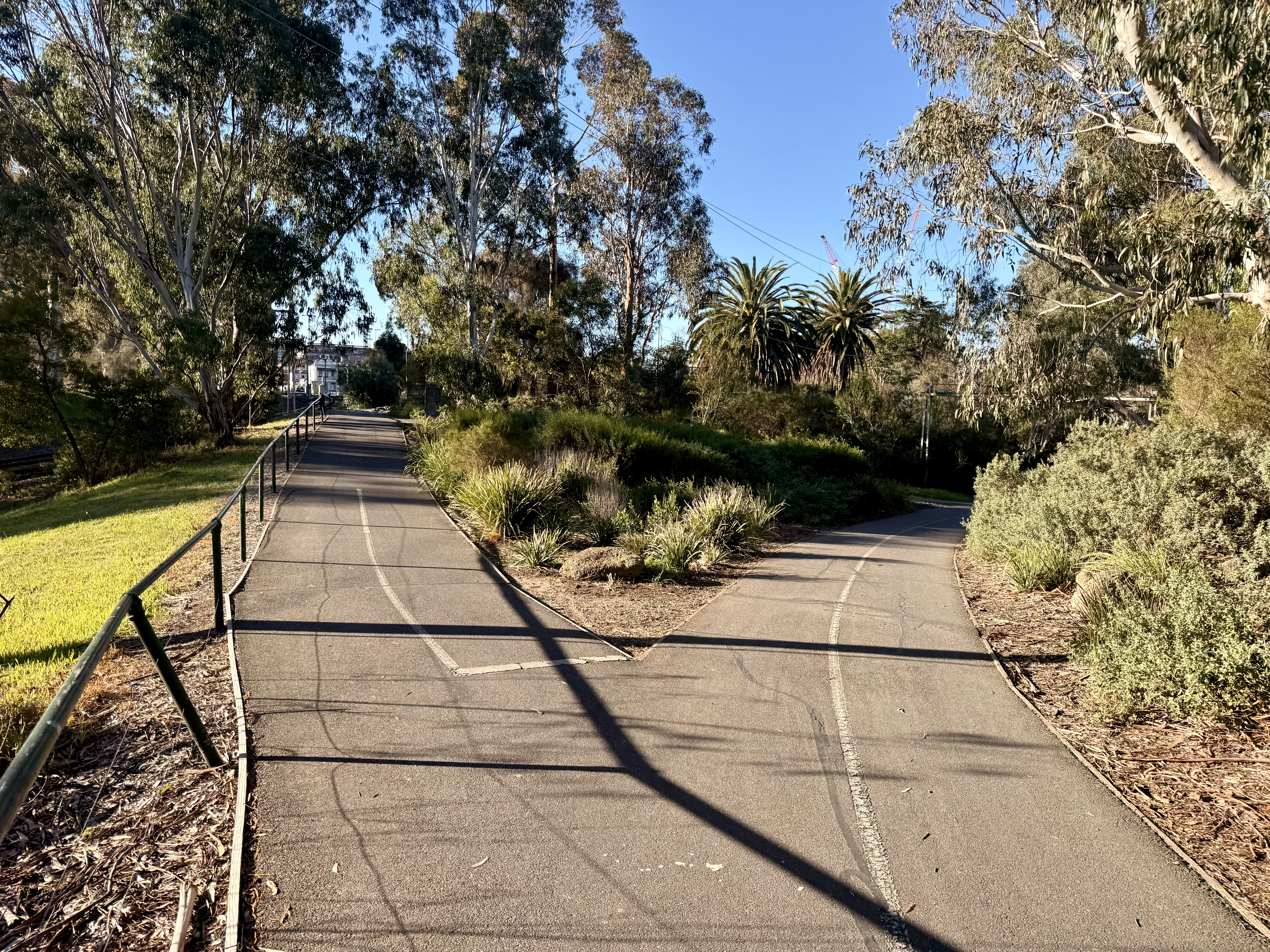
The southern end of the Upfield shared path to the left, branching off the Capital City Trail which continues to the right.

The southern end of the Upfield Bike Path connects to the Capital City Trail on the old Inner Circle railway line reservation which provides access to the Merri Creek Trail at Rushall railway station; and in the other direction it passes near the Melbourne Zoo before connecting with the Moonee Ponds Creek Trail.

Alternatively, at Park Street cyclists can join the Royal Parade bike path and on road bike lane which provides access to University of Melbourne main campus in Parkville.

City of Moreland Council has reported the number of people counted riding on the Upfield Bike Path and Sydney Road at Park Street has almost quadrupled from 1992 to 2003. The 24-hour weekday average was 804 in February 2008.

The Upfield path parallels Sydney Road shopping strip in Brunswick and Coburg, and is often used by pedestrians and cyclists for shopping, dog walking as well as commuter cycling.

Historic buildings along the path include the Brunswick Baths at Dawson Street and the Railway Hotel (now a Backpackers Hostel) at Albert Street, Brunswick.

== Landmarks ==
Upfield railway line, Melbourne Zoo.

== Solar lighting at Fawkner Cemetery ==
The section passing the Fawkner Cemetery was upgraded in February 2009 to include the world's first shared-pathway, solar lighting schema. Stonnington City Council introduced solar lighting on the Gardiners Creek Trail in May 2007. However they did not make use of a colour scheme as seen on the Upfield Bike path.

Previously the path was without lights and unfriendly to riders. The new array of red LED on the left and white LED on the right, creates a delineated "airport runway" style, visually stunning, lighting grid, providing up to 600 metres of visible pathway for riders, even at the darkest hours. Hazards are indicated using amber LED.

For safety, the lights are mounted flush with the ground where they absorb more than enough energy, stored in their environmentally friendly super capacitors during daylight, to provide up to 14 hours of continuous lighting.

== Connections ==
- The path starts at the Western Ring Road Trail in the north
- It meets the Capital City Trail in the south.

North end at 37.692418°S 144.956514°E. South end at 37.780251°S 144.957067°E.

== Cultural references ==
Upfield Bike Path is the name and subject matter of a song by Melbourne indie band Huon. The track appears on the compilation album Kraftworks.
