= Thomastown, Victoria =

Thomastown
- Suburb
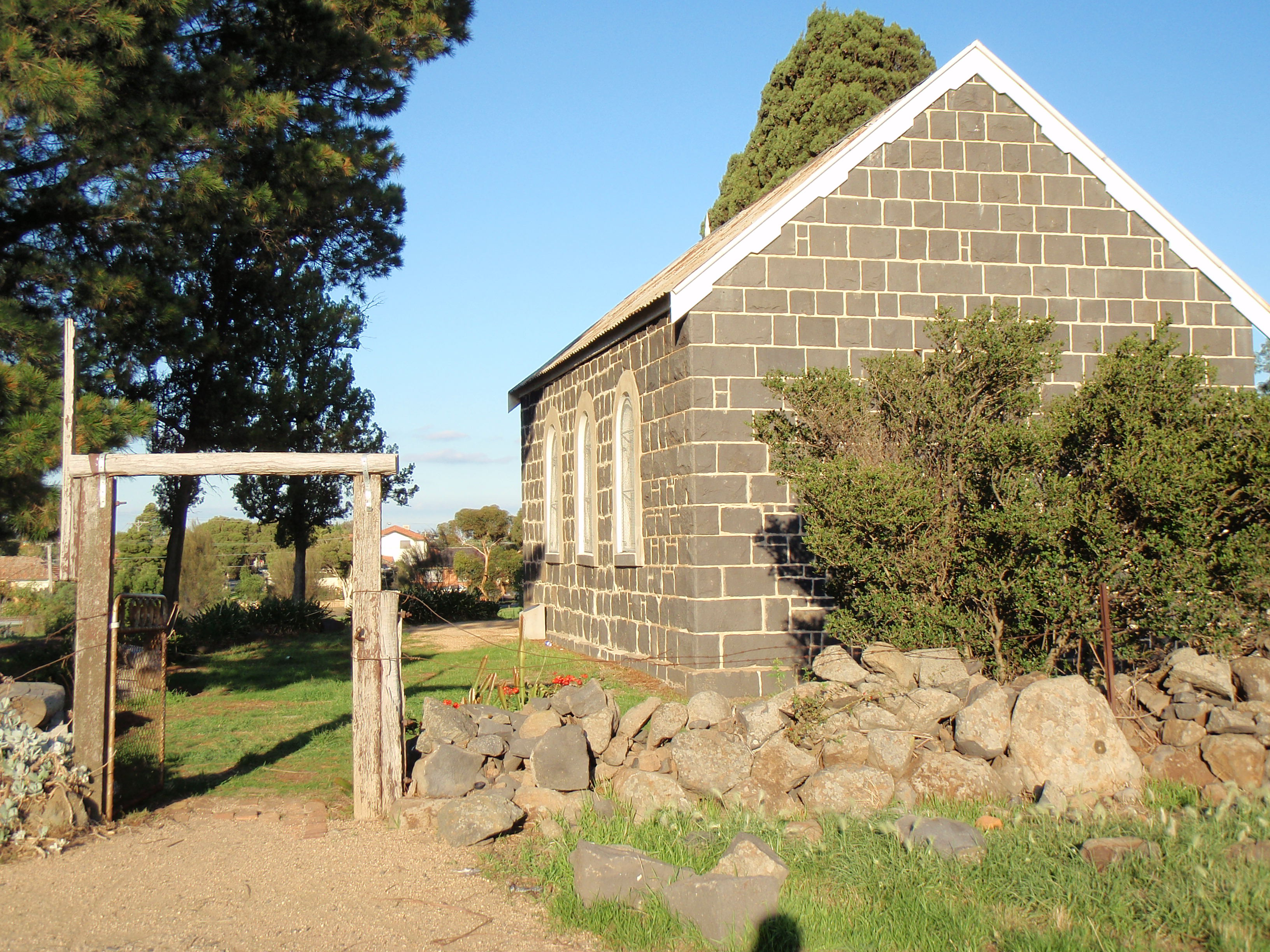
- Lutheran Church at heritage Westgarthtown precinct in Thomastown

- Interactive map of Thomastown
- Coordinates: 37.682°S 145.014°E
- Country: Australia
- State: Victoria
- City: Melbourne
- LGA: City of Whittlesea
- Location: 16 km (9.9 mi) from Melbourne

Government
  - State electorate: Thomastown
  - Federal division: Scullin

Area
  - Total: 14.7 km^{2} (5.7 sq mi)
- Elevation: 112 m (367 ft)

Population
  - Total: 14,234 (2021 census)
  - Density: 968/km^{2} (2,508/sq mi)
- Postcode: 3074
Suburbs around Thomastown
Campbellfield	Lalor	Mill Park
Campbellfield	Thomastown	Bundoora
Fawkner	Reservoir	Bundoora

Thomastown is a suburb of Melbourne, Victoria, Australia, 16 km driving distance (14km line of sight) approximately 30 minutes north of Melbourne's central business district, located within the City of Whittlesea local government area. Thomastown recorded a population of 14,234 at the 2021 census.

Thomastown is known for sharing its area with Westgarthtown, a historical settlement.

== History and development ==
Thomastown came into existence in 1848 when the John Honniball Thomas and Mary née Hartnell family bought 106 acres, the land north of Melbourne for market gardening. Two years later, William Westgarth bought land north of Thomas' holding, which he made way for German settlers. Thomastown Post Office opened on 9 June 1862. The Thomastown area attracted many farmers and much horse-racing until World War II. In 1889, the Epping railway line opened and milk production and distribution grew during the 1930s when a German dairying family formed the Pura Dairy, ultimately to expand into Preston and became Metropolitan Dairies Pty. Ltd. In 1947, a housing co-operative was formed 2 km. north in the suburb of Lalor. Soon, residential development began at Thomastown. While German settlers already call this area home, more settlers moved in, mostly Italians, Macedonians and Greeks. In 1961 St. Clare's Primary School opened, followed by Thomastown Secondary College and then Thomastown West Primary School.

== Modern Thomastown ==
Thomastown has a strip shopping centre in High Street parallel to the Thomastown Railway Station, a shopping centre corner of Edgars Road and Main Street and shops on Settlement Road and Dalton Road, plus various shopping strips east of the train station. Thomastown Secondary College is located on Main Street, adjacent to Thomastown West Primary School, Thomastown Recreational and Aquatic Centre (TRAC) and Thomastown Library which is managed by Yarra Plenty Regional Library. Thomastown East has a grid street configuration, predating the later configuration in Thomastown West which protects residential streets from through traffic. On the south of Thomastown there are numerous factories and an electricity terminal station, near the Metropolitan Ring Road / Northern Ring Road. There is also the Hume Freeway, which is west of Thomastown.

The Galada Tamboore Path to the west and the Metropolitan Ring Road Trail to the south provide facilities for recreational and commuting cyclists. Edgars Creek and the Edgars Creek Trail runs along a linear park which is next to a reserve with ovals.

Each year around March the community unite for the annual Whittlesea Community festival, a festival that showcases local culture through live entertainment, food stalls, hand made crafts and fireworks finale. The festival is held at the Barry Road parklands in Thomastown.

Thomastown is also the home to Select Harvests corporate offices and one of its two almond processing plants.

Thomastown Mosque was built (early 1990s) by the Turkish Australian community and is located opposite the train station.

== Thomastown railway station ==
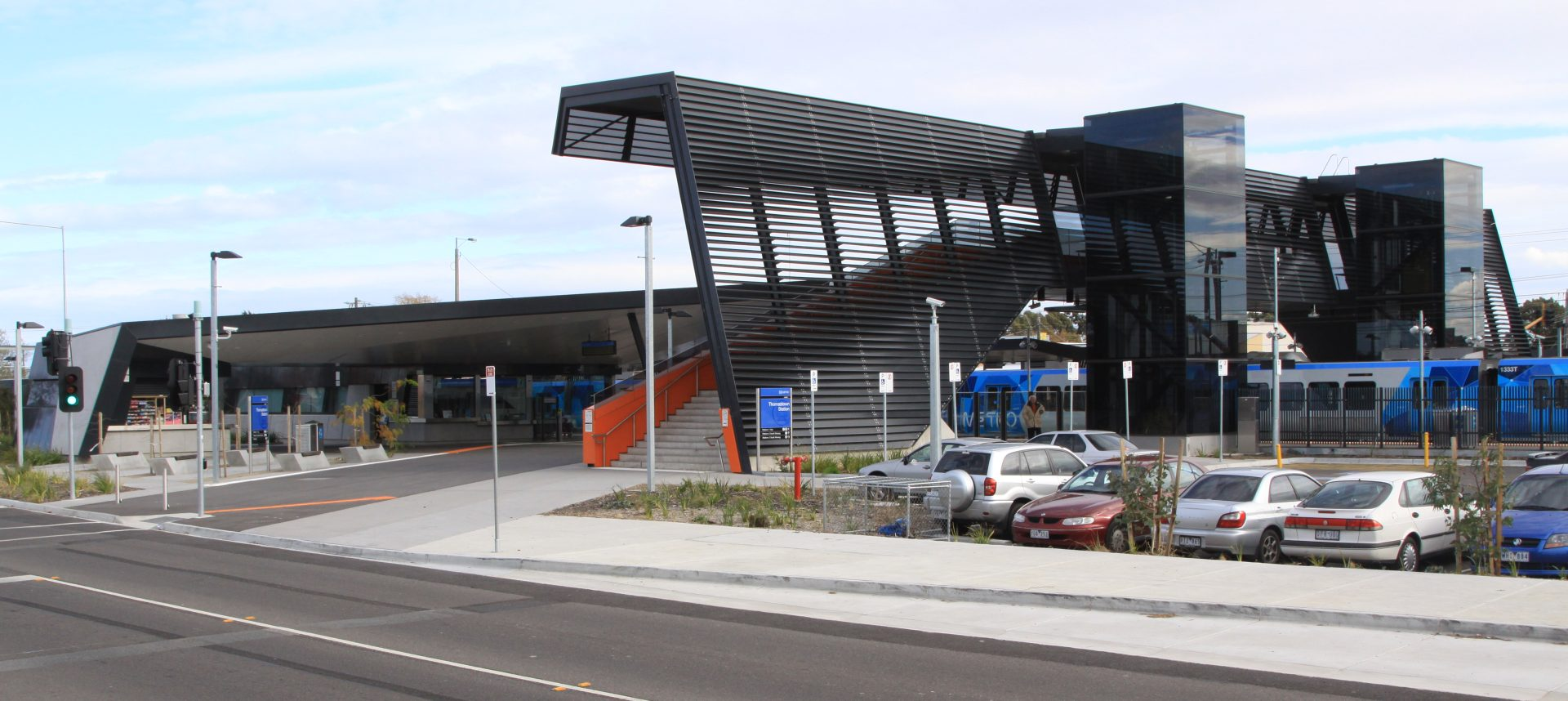
Eastern side of Thomastown railway station in June 2012

Thomastown railway station opened on 23 December 1889. It was originally a single platform railway station located on High Street between Main Street and Spring Street. Thomastown railway station is directly linked to the City via the Mernda line. In 2011, the station was upgraded. A second platform, 310 parking spaces for cars, and a pedestrian overpass to cross over to the second platform were all added as were lifts for the disabled and new Myki card systems which replaced the old ticket system.

== Sport ==
Thomastown has 5 sporting ovals scattered to each side of Thomastown. These include the Nick Ascenzo Park located off Boronia Street, Thomastown East Recreational Reserve located off Rowen Street, HR Uren Reserve located next to Victoria Drive, West RGC Cook Reserve located on Robinvale Avenue and Main Street Recreational Reserve which is located next to Edgars Creek and TRAC. There is also a Thomastown Football Club, an Australian rules football team, which competes in the Northern Football League.

== Notable people ==
- Kris Pavlidis – First Greek female Mayor of the City of Whittlesea, long-serving councillor, community advocate, speaker and social worker.

== Books on Thomastown ==
Jones, Michael Nature's Plenty: a history of the City of Whittlesea, Sydney, N.S.W. Allen & Unwin, 1992 ISBN 1863730761
