= Northern Pipe Trail =

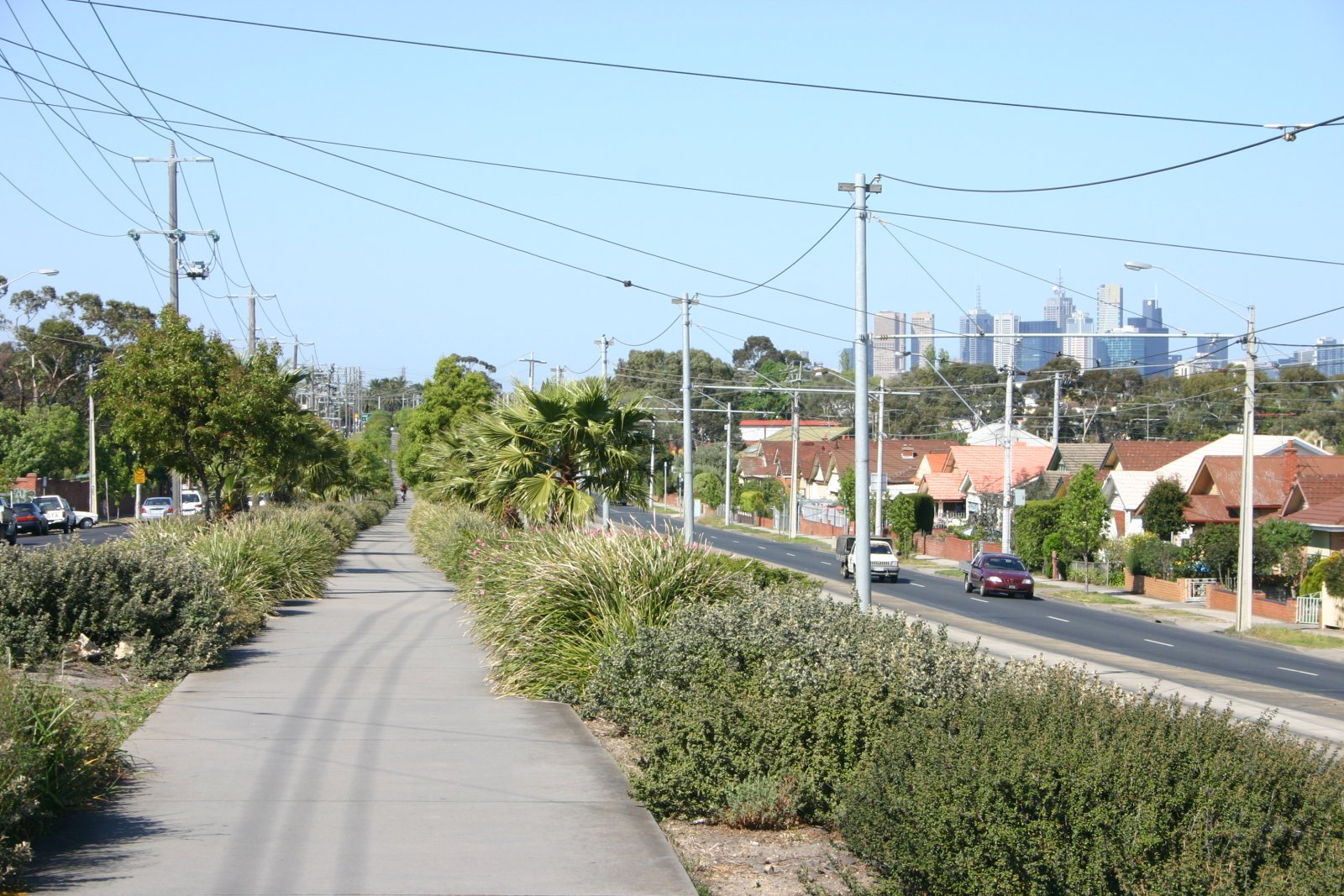
- The path looking towards Melbourne CBD
- Length: 9.6km
- Location: Melbourne, Victoria, Australia
- Difficulty: Easy
- Hazards: Cars
- Water: None
- Train: Stations along the Mernda line
- Tram: Route 11

The Northern Pipe Trail (previously known as the St Georges Road Trail), is a shared-use path for cyclists and pedestrians that follows Cheddar and St Georges Roads in the northern suburbs of Reservoir, Preston and Thornbury in Melbourne, Victoria, Australia.

The trail mostly runs up the centre of St Georges Road, making use of the wide median strip. It was originally developed as the St George's Road Trail in the mid 1990s. It received the current name after an upgrade related to replacing a major water main in 2019.

== Following the path ==
Leave the Western Ring Road Trail at Dalton Road. There are no signs to the St Georges Road Trail at this point. Dalton Road is unsuitable for cycling due to the heavy vehicles using the road. Using the footpath on the west side of Dalton Road, continue 400m south from the highway, to the start of a 600m low quality sandy shared path in the City of Whittlesea. It ends 160 metres north of the Keon Pde/Dalton Rd/Tunaley Pde intersection. Continue on the west side of Dalton Rd via the footpath to the intersection. Use the pedestrian crossing to cross to the east side of Dalton Rd and Tunaley Pde. The high quality trail in the City of Darebin, starts at Tunaley Pde, 1.4 km from the Metropolitan Ring Road and heads down the Yan Yean pipe reserve.

From there it follows Cheddar Road to a large intersection at the Reservoir shopping area and comes to a stop. Use the pedestrian crossings to cross SW to Reservoir railway station. The path restarts adjacent to the station car park. Continue between the reservoirs hiding behind the rows of trees lining the street on either side. The path continues diagonally in the GE Robinson reserve, beside the palms.

On the south side of the park the trail runs parallel to Robinson Road past Regent railway station. Follow the train line. 600m later, the path crosses the tracks and soon reaches St Georges Road and Murray Road.

Carefully cross over to the dividing strip going down the middle of St Georges Road. The path passes the Preston campus of Melbourne Polytechnic. The trail stays on the dividing strip the whole way, except for a 500m section, between Ray Braham Gardens and Miller Street by the tram corral.

The most southerly end of the trail is the junction of St Georges Road, Charles Street and Merri Parade. A roundabout was previously in the junction, but it was a blackspot for cyclists, and was removed in 2009. The Merri Creek Trail and Capital City Trail can be accessed by proceeding to the nearby Merri Parade.

== Connections ==
- Nearly reaches the Western Ring Road Trail in the north
- Connects to the Merri Creek Trail in the south.
- In April 2010 connections to the Capital City Trail were improved with the addition of a new bridge across Merri Creek, 160m south of the junction of Union Street and Merri Parade, not far from the St Georges Road trail.

North end at 37.696450°S 145.022673°E. South end at 37.776796°S 144.989642°E.
