= New Mecklenburg =

New Mecklenburg may refer to:

- Gomersal, South Australia, village in the Barossa Valley renamed in 1918
- Marysville, California, county seat of Yuba County
- New Ireland (island), large island in the state of Papua New Guinea, known as Neu Mecklenburg while under German colonial control from 1885 to 1914
- New Ireland Province, administrative division of Papua New Guinea
- Westgarthtown, Victoria was known as Neu Mecklenburg from establishment around 1850 until World War I when it was absorbed into Thomastown
