= Department of Infrastructure =

Department of Infrastructure may refer to:

- Department of Infrastructure (Isle of Man), an Isle of Man government department
- Department of Infrastructure (Manitoba), a Manitoba, Canada, government department
- Department for Infrastructure (Northern Ireland), a Northern Ireland government department
- Department of Infrastructure (Victoria), an Australian state government department
- Department of Infrastructure, Energy and Resources, a Tasmanian government department
- Department of Infrastructure and Regional Development, an Australian Public Service department
- Department of Infrastructure and Industrial Development, department of the Indian state of Uttar Pradesh
