= Edgars Creek Trail =

Shared use path in Melbourne, Australia

- Length: 2.2km
- Location: Melbourne, Victoria, Australia
- Difficulty: easy
- Hazards: goat track section
- Surface: 1/2 goat track, 1/2 concrete
- Hills: none
- Train: Thomastown station

The Edgars Creek Trail is a shared use path for cyclists and pedestrians in the suburb of Thomastown, an inner northern suburb of Melbourne, Victoria.

It leads to the historic village of Westgarthtown.

== Following the Path ==
The path is signed on the Western Ring Road Trail. Leaving the Western Ring Road Trail the trail immediately degenerates into a goat track beside Edgars Creek. On the north side of Spring St a private property blocks the path. Further to the north and about 1 km later, it returns to a decent concrete path.

== Connections ==
Dead end in the north at German Lane. Western Ring Road Trail in the south.

North end at 37.672869°S 145.005109°E. South end at 37.685968°S 145.008195°E.
