= Steele Creek Trail =

Trail in Melbourne, Victoria, Australia

- Length: 4.2 km
- Location: Melbourne, Victoria, Australia
- Difficulty: Easy
- Hills: Steep section at the most southern end
- Train: None
- Tram: None

The Steele Creek Trail is a shared use path for cyclists and pedestrians, which follows Steele Creek in the Outer North Western suburbs of Keilor Park, Keilor East, Tullamarine, Airport West, Melbourne Airport, Avondale heights, Essendon West and Niddrie in Melbourne.

The trail will make for a useful shortcut between the Western Ring Road Trail in the north and the Maribyrnong River Trail in the south, when the Valley Lake Estate housing development is completed.

== Following the Path ==
The trail has a large gap at the site of the Valley Lake Estate housing development, currently (2010) being built on an old quarry site in Niddrie. When completed (estimated as late 2010) the cyclist will be able to traverse the full length of the trail. While still not complete in Jan 2012, it is still possible to traverse this section with a little bit of ingenuity. There is a small but busy road section at Keilor Rd and Woorite Pl at the northern end i.e. the freeway off ramp. Other than that, navigation is straight forward.

The Victorian State Government financed a new underpass of Buckley St in 2009, creating a link to the Maribyrnong River Trail. Construction commenced in October 2009 and the underpass was opened to the public on 28 May 2010, with access to St Bernard's College and Rosehill Secondary College.

== Connections ==
- Meets the Western Ring Road Trail in the north
- And the Maribyrnong River Trail in the south. In 2010 an underpass passing under Buckley St was installed, linking the trail directly to the Maribyrnong River Trail just west of Lily St. While still a climb to the underpass on both sides, it finally negates having to cope with the fast traffic at Buckley St.

North end at 37.728836°S 144.862713°E. South end at 37.753238°S 144.882435°E.
