= Plenty River Trail =

Shared use path in Melbourne, Australia

- Length: 12.3km
- Location: Melbourne, Victoria, Australia
- Difficulty: Medium
- Surface: Gravel, concrete and bitumen
- Hills: Large hill between Yarra River Trail and the Plenty River
- Train: Greensborough station
- Tram: None
- Bus: Route 563 Bus

The Plenty River Trail is a shared use path for cyclists and pedestrians, which follows the Plenty River through the suburbs of Greensborough and Lower Plenty in Melbourne, Victoria, Australia.

The last major gap in the trail was eliminated by the completion of a footbridge across the river, south of the Heidelberg Golf Club, in March 2007. The trail now runs all the way from the Yarra River to the Greensborough Bypass and points further north.

== Route ==
Although there is a sign near the most northerly bend of Punkerri Circuit which declares this as the end of the Trail, the actual track starts further north off an easement, at the most northerly bend of Plenty River Drive, 120 m from Acworth Court. When the path reaches the signed end point, it is well-defined but somewhat rough, narrow and overgrown.

Not far down the path is a bus stop, which surprisingly can be found in this heavily treed area. Further along, past a pipe bridge and 1.6 km later, the Greensborough Bypass bridge spans the valley. On the east side of the road a path goes up to a goat track, which can be used to access the Western Ring Road Trail. The Western Ring Road Trail passes across the bridge on the bridge's north side.

Leaving the bridge behind, the path gradually improves and arrives 1 km later at a footbridge. Paths run off in all directions on both sides of the footbridge. Just continue across the footbridge and continue straight ahead across Kalparrin Ave and along the north side of the Whatmough Park oval.

On the far side of the oval is a suspension footbridge. There are no signs here. The rule in this case, is always to do a very sharp right turn immediately after crossing the bridge, regardless of from what direction one arrives. Do not go straight ahead.

The path goes under Main Street and 800 m later arrives at an apparent dead end at the end of a small street - Bicton Street. Turn right (west) and head along Bicton Street. The path resumes at its far end.

Continuing leads to an athletics track, complete with the characteristic red brick colored track. Skirt round the east side of the track and cross a small footbridge on its south side. 2 km later another footbridge appears (near Allima Court). There are no signs here and its possible to lose the trail; maintain a NE - SW direction.

Past a stand of large Monkey Puzzle trees and further on to the old Lower Plenty Road iron bridge, built on bluestone supports. Cross the bridge, turn right and go past the Heidelberg golf course and over the final and newest footbridge.

The trail moves into a more open area above the Plenty river where horses are kept. The trail goes up and up, past the large transmitter antenna, past the old grain silos in the distance and affords excellent views of the immediate area. It overlooks the ancient floodplain surrounding the confluence of the Plenty and Yarra Rivers.

Finally the trail drops about 30 m to the floor of the Yarra valley, to meet with the Yarra River Trail.

== Connections ==
Western Ring Road Trail in the north and Yarra River Trail in the south. The Plenty Gorge Mountain Biking Park can also be accessed from the northern end.

North end at 37.682318°S 145.112187°E. South end at 37.750189°S 145.092719°E.
