= Thomastown Mosque =

Turkish Islamic mosque in Australia

- Turkish: Thomastown Türk İslam Cemiyeti Camii
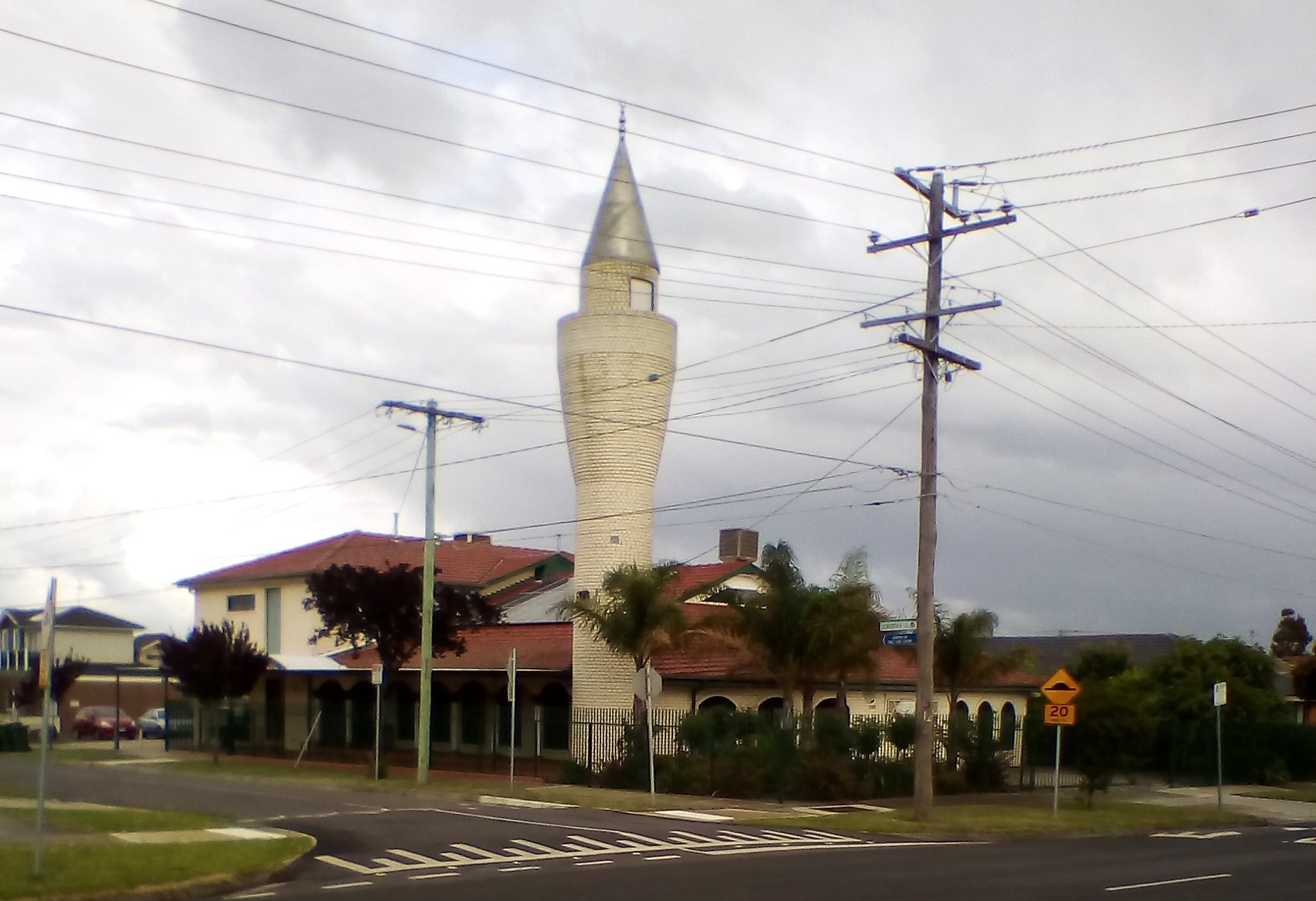

- Location in greater metropolitan Melbourne

Religion
- Affiliation: Sunni Islam
- Ecclesiastical or organizational status: Mosque
- Ownership: Thomastown Turkish Education and Islamic Society (Thomastown Türk Eğitim ve İslam Cemiyeti)
- Leadership: Hasan Öztürk (Imam)
- Status: Active

Location
- Location: 124-130 Station St, Thomastown 3074, Melbourne, Victoria
- Country: Australia
- Interactive map of Thomastown Mosque
- Coordinates: 37°40′53″S 145°00′54″E

Architecture
- Type: Mosque
- Completed: 1993
- Minaret: 1

Website
- Thomastown Turkish Islamic Society

The Thomastown Mosque (Turkish: Thomastown Türk İslam Cemiyeti Camii), is a mosque located in Thomastown, a northern suburb of Melbourne, Victoria, Australia. The mosque is situated opposite the railway line and Thomastown railway station. Associated with the Turkish Australian community, the mosque is owned by and the centre of the Thomastown Turkish Education and Islamic Society. The 8th and the current imam for Thomastown Mosque is Hasan Öztürk.

== History ==
Turkish immigrants from Turkey arrived and settled in Thomastown, a working class suburb that at the time was a remote part of Melbourne. Turks which settled were often young families seeking employment or to purchase a home in the area, whereas some sent remittances to Turkey. Due to their difficult economic plight, sentiments arose among the community that desired its religious needs to be addressed to cope with the situation.

In the early 1980s, the Muslims in Thomastown numbered some 30 people and the Turkish Islamic Society purchased a property to cater for its community regarding prayers. A neighbouring property was purchased to serve as a home for the imam. By 1991, the Muslims numbered 2,574 and there was community need to have a mosque. The Thomastown Turkish Education and Islamic Society was granted a permit, subject to various restrictions and conditions, to have a community centre by Whittlesea Council in February 1983. Some of those included having no more than 15 people present on the premises and an annual renewal of the permit, undertaken by Whittlesea Council between 1984-1986. In 1987, no renewal was attempted. Whittlesea Council rejected multiple applications from the Islamic Society for the property to be used for worship. Instead, the Whittlesea Council suggested was that he Islamic Society submit an application for a community centre. Misunderstandings of Whittlesea Council actions led the Islamic Society to view the Muslim community as recipients of discrimination.

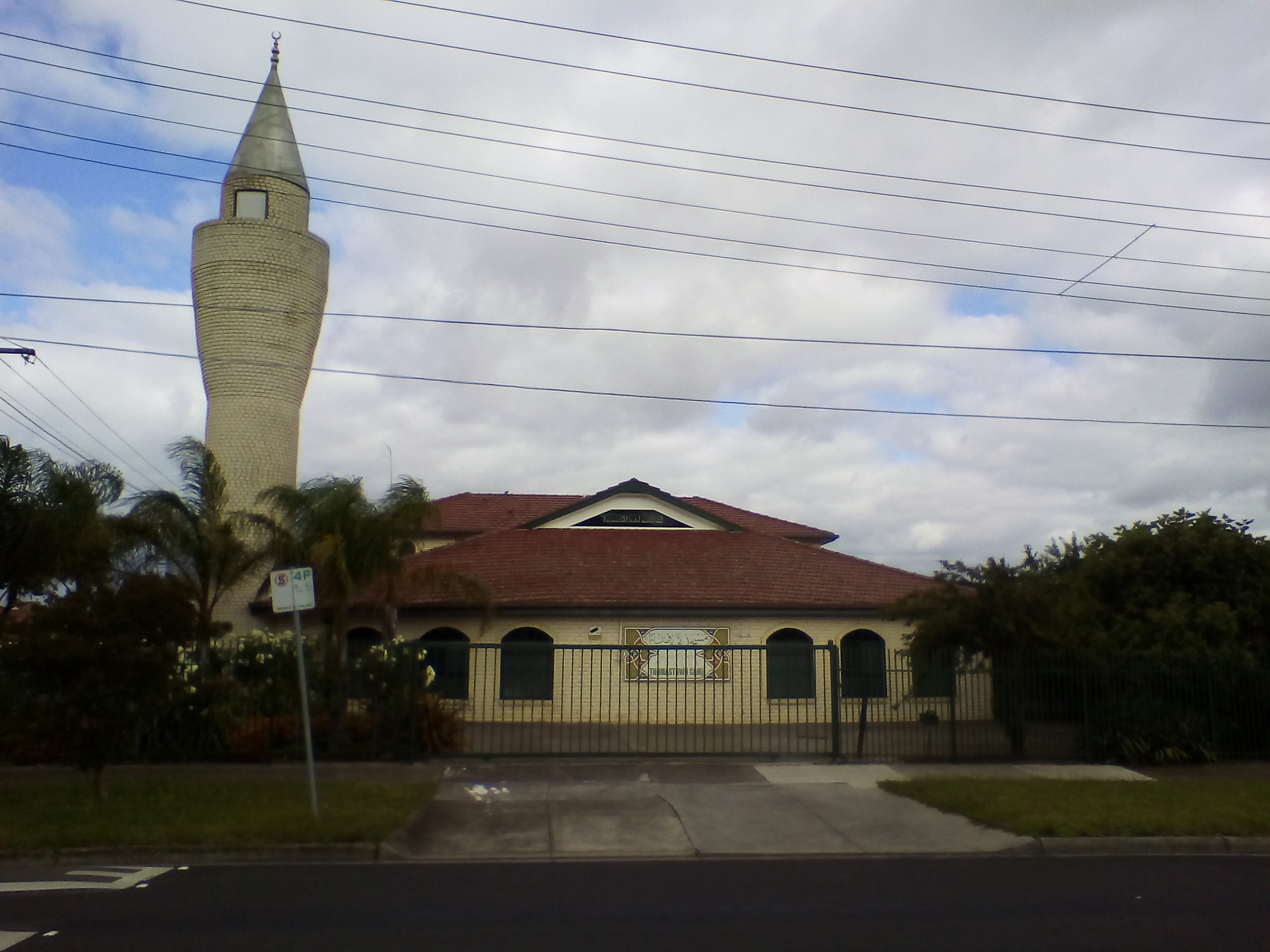
View of mosque from Station St

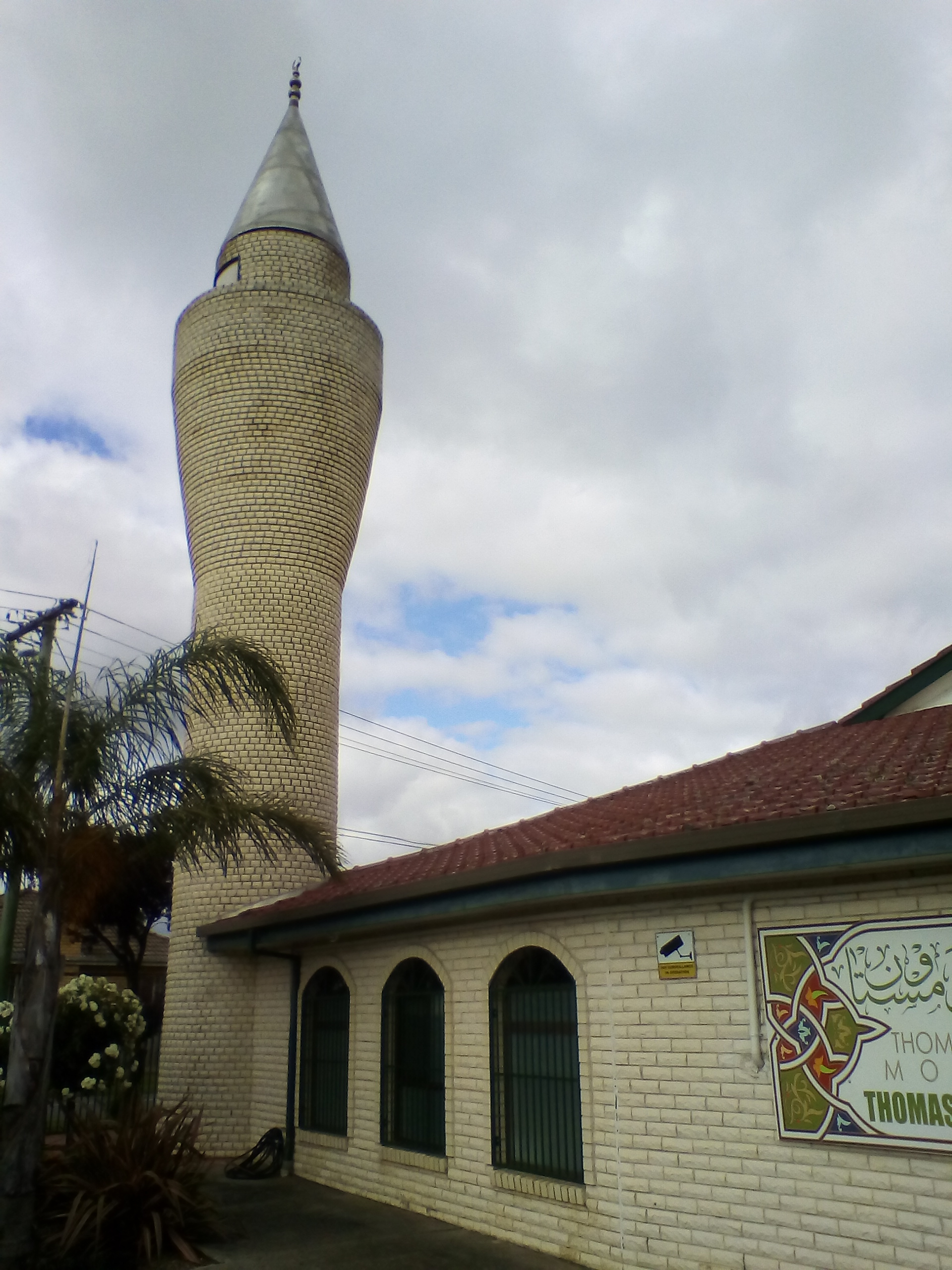
Mosque minaret

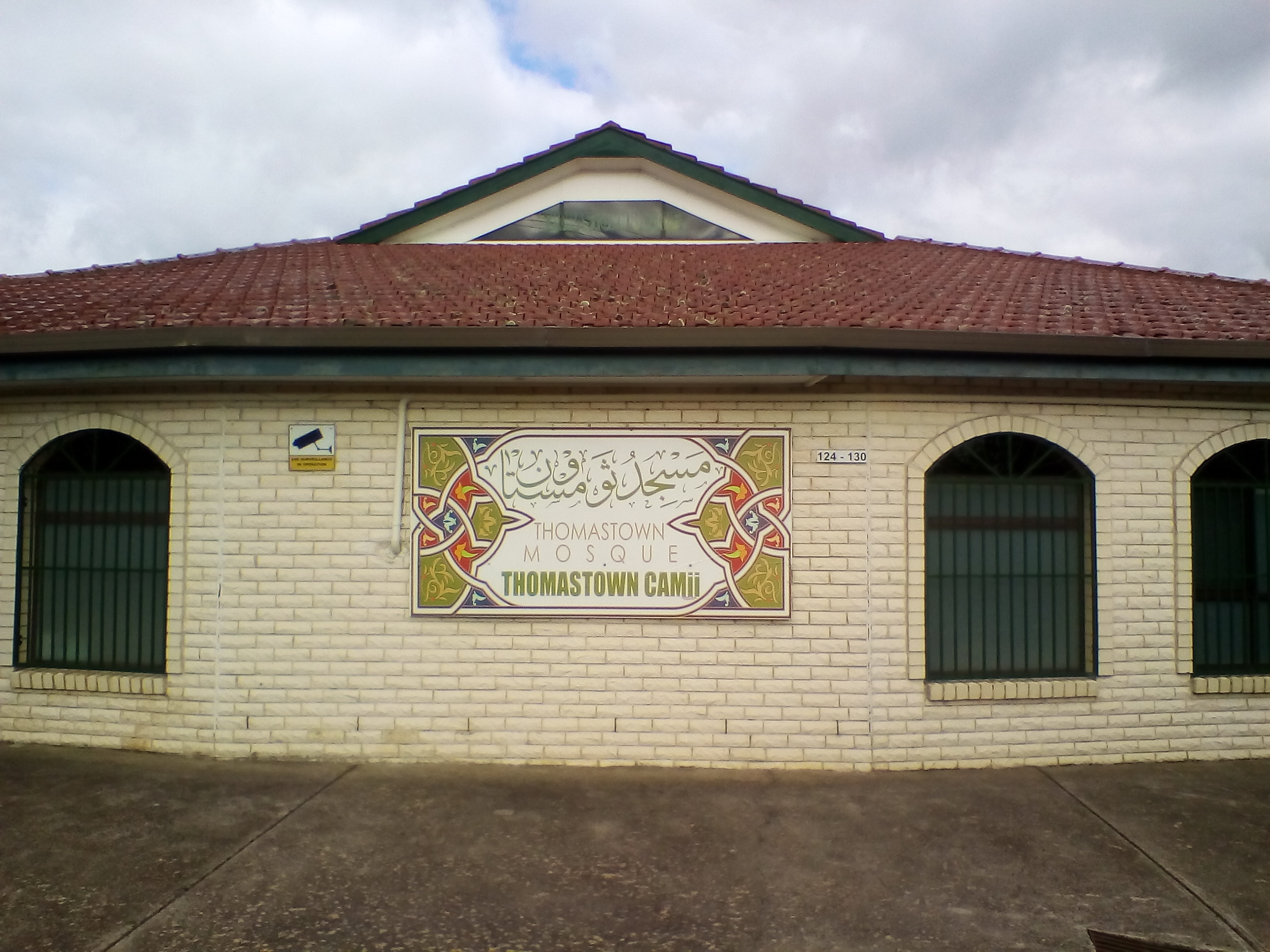
Mosque plaque

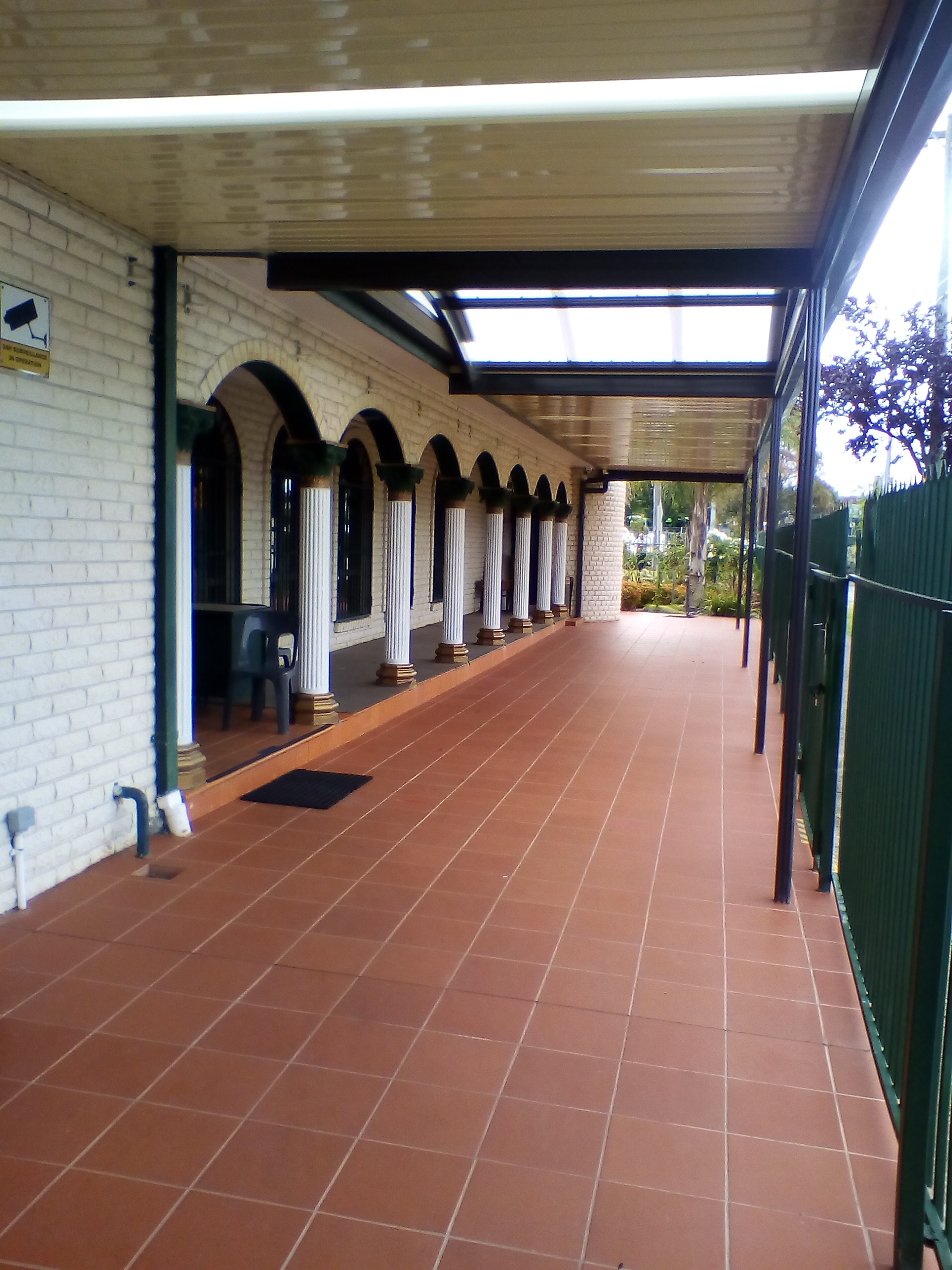
Covered portico and mosque entrance

The Islamic Society was informed by Whittlesea Council (May 1987) that the permit expired and the property could not be used as a community centre. An application was lodged with Whittlesea Council for a planning permit for a mosque and community centre. Four locals, after being informed through an advertisement, were opposed to the plans. By November 1987, deliberation by Whittlesea Council of the application resulted in a Refusal Notice. Three reasons were given, that congestive parking would affect the residential area, increased noise, in particular at night, and funeral ceremonies conducted on the property perceived as detrimental. Whittlesea Council also stated that the neighbouring Islamic Society premises could only be used for residential purposes and a fence should be reinstalled between both properties. Another application was put forward by the Islamic Society in January 1988, later withdrawn after talks with Whittlesea Council. In February, a new application was submitted for a community centre and the Islamic Society was told that no religious activities could take place and the fence needed to be reinstalled. During 1988, Whittlesea Council permission was given for 20 people to be present at any given time at the community centre.

The restrictions from the Whittlesea Council motivated the Islamic Society to submit an appeal at the Administrative Appeals Tribunal. During July 1988, the Tribunal extended the permit until March 1990 and allowed for a mosque to be built. The Islamic Society held discrimination toward them as a reason for the difficulties it encountered. Identified as such by the Islamic Society were Whittlesea Council actions like its recommendation that the word "Islamic" or "Islam" on signs not be displayed in return for assistance, opposing parking over traffic concerns and having gone to court 10 times, or giving a church funds for repairs, but not them.

== See also ==
- Islam in Australia
- List of mosques in Oceania
