= Sandridge Trail =

Shared-use path for cyclists in Melbourne, Victoria, Australia

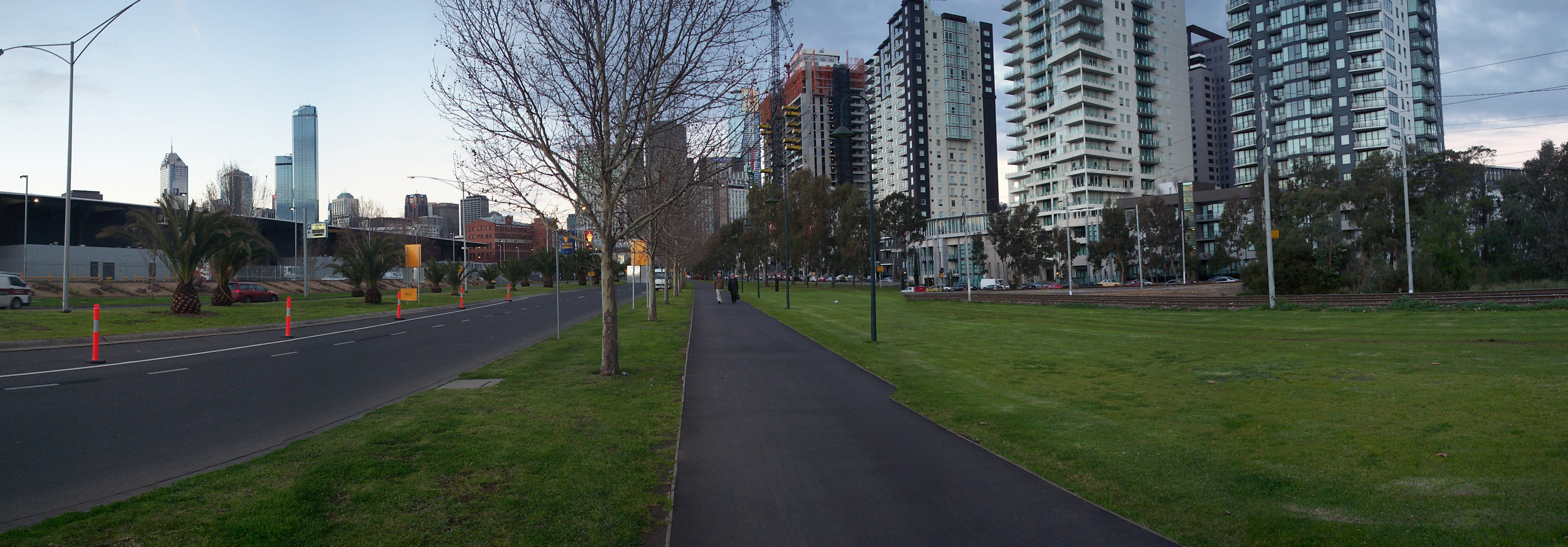
- Sandridge Trail, looking towards Melbourne.
- Length: 3.0 km
- Location: Melbourne, Victoria, Australia
- Difficulty: Easy
- Hazards: Trams at the tram corral
- Hills: None
- Water: None
- Train: Flinders Street station
- Tram: Route 109

The Sandridge Trail is a shared-use path for cyclists and pedestrians located in the inner southern suburb of Port Melbourne in Melbourne, Victoria, Australia.

It follows the former Port Melbourne railway line, now the 109 tram route. The trail is also known as the 109 tram trail, which is a misnomer since the tram goes to Box Hill, while the trail only goes to the CBD.

The trail is significant as it follows the path many new immigrants to Australia took when they first entered the country to begin a new life. See also Sandridge Bridge.

As of 2007, the Melbourne Convention Centre area is being developed further. The development is to maintain a link between the Sandridge Trail and Capital City Trail.

== Following the path ==
At Melbourne Convention & Exhibition Centre leave the Capital City Trail by the Yarra River and head south down Clarendon Street to where the Restaurant Trams start their run at Normandy Road. The off-road trail starts here and heads west along Normandy Road soon arriving at the tram corral.

== Connections ==
The Sandridge Trail connects with the Bayside Trail in the west. Heading north leads to West Gate Bridge and the Yarra River punt. Heading south leads to St Kilda. The Capital City Trail is located at the east end and runs into the Melbourne city centre.

- West end at 37.841276°S 144.932568°E
- East end at 37.823744°S 144.955654°E

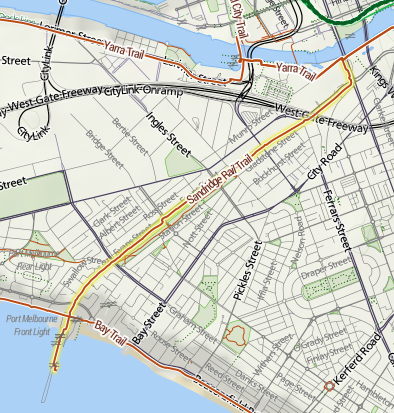
Map of the rail trail
