= Wellness Trail =

Bike path in Melbourne

- Length: 9km
- Location: Melbourne, Victoria, Australia
- Difficulty: Easy
- Hazards: None
- Surface: Concrete
- Hills: None
- Water: None
- Trains: Sunshine station via Kororoit Creek Trail, Ginifer station via Western Ring Road Trail

The Wellness Trail is a shared use path for cyclists and pedestrians running alongside the Deer Park Bypass in the western suburbs of Melbourne, Victoria, Australia.

The trail is named the Wellness Trail and is signed as such, once only, at its most easterly end. Regardless of this naming, the trail is signed as the Western Fwy Path from one end to the other. Adding to the confusion is that it connects to the Western Ring Road Trail.

== Following the path ==
The path meets the Western Ring Road Trail on the south side of the bypass at Fitzgerald Rd. It crosses to the north side at Mt Derrimut Rd, crosses Robinsons Rd, turns north to cross Riding Boundary Rd and finishes at the Western Highway at Caroline Springs. The trail features six rest stops with thirty mosaics on the subject of mental health, created by patients at Sunshine Hospital.

== Connections ==
Path to Caroline Springs at the Western Highway in the north and the Western Ring Road Trail in the south east.

North end at 37.756453°S 144.739813°E. South east end at 37.797388°S 144.789783°E.
