= Craigieburn Bypass Trail =

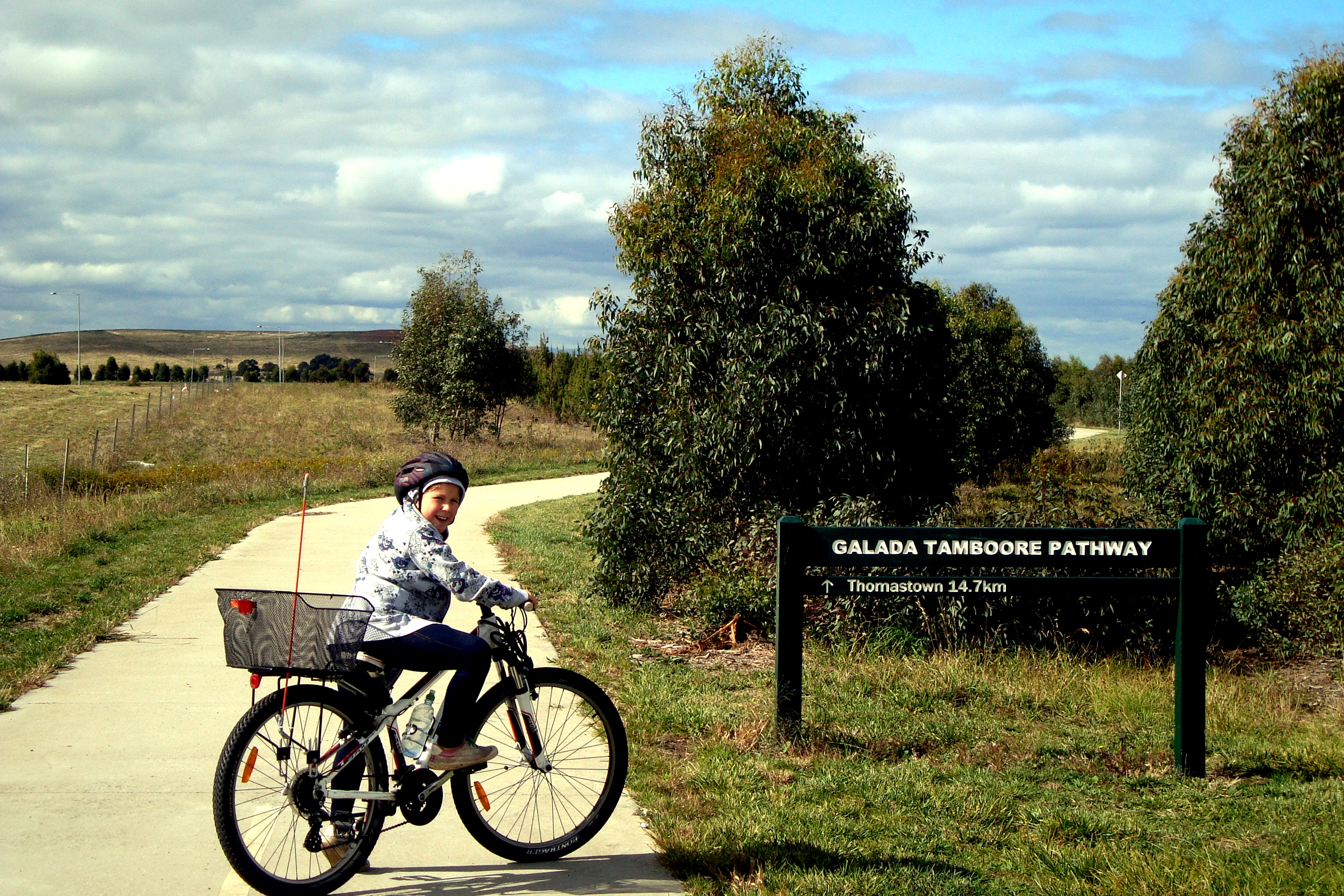
- Sign at Craigieburn at the start of the trail
- Length: 15.5km
- Location: Melbourne, Victoria, Australia
- Difficulty: Easy
- Surface: Wide concrete
- Hills: Nothing serious
- Water: None
- Train: Craigieburn station
- Tram: None

The Craigieburn Bypass Trail (also known as the Galada Tamboore Pathway), is a shared use path for cyclists and pedestrians in the outer northern suburbs of Melbourne, Victoria, Australia. In 2008 it was given the local name of the Galada Tamboore Pathway - Wurundjeri for "creek waterhole" or "stream waterhole" - as it goes past the Craigieburn, Cooper street and Galada Tamboore grasslands which are all nationally significant for their plains grassland and riparian habitat for endangered and vulnerable native fauna and flora, including the critically endangered Golden Sun Moth.

While in Craigieburn consider a side trip to Mount Ridley or a return trip via the Broadmeadows Valley Trail.

An interactive map of the trail as well as others in the Melbourne area is available from the 'External links' section in this article.

== Following the path ==
The north end of the trail starts at the intersection of Grand Blvd and the Hume Highway. If starting from Craigieburn railway station, it would be more convenient to access the trail via Craigieburn Road.

The path has some interesting features including the Northern lights and the Barry Road (Whittlesea Gardens) footbridge - see the Craigieburn Bypass.

The trail finally makes a sharp turn to the east and meets up with the Western Ring Road Trail near a footbridge over the Western Ring Road. If going east on the Western Ring Road Trail just continue onwards. If heading west along the Western Ring Road Trail cross the footbridge to the southern side of the highway.

Whittlesea Gardens Footbridge

A rust-red coloured footbridge at the Whittlesea Gardens in Lalor provides views of the Hume Freeway with the Melbourne CBD skyline on the horizon. The footbridge is jocularly referred to as the Ned Kelly Bridge because its features resemble the bushranger's helmet. The footbridge leads into an unsealed track through the Galada Tamboore grasslands and over Merri Creek. The track becomes sealed on the east side of the bridge to Merri Concourse and follows the Creek south along the west bank as far as Somerset Road, Campbellfield, with sweeping views across the creek valley to the Galada Tamboore grasslands and the Hume Freeway on the horizon.

== Connections ==
The electrified railway service to Craigieburn station was opened on 30 September 2007 together with a new station at Roxburgh Park at Somerton Road - Roxburgh Park railway station. The Craigieburn service was previously by Sprinter Railcars.

North end at 37.584216°S 144.940926°E South end at 37.687985°S 144.993985°E.
