= Moonee Ponds Creek Trail =

Shared use path in Melbourne, Australia

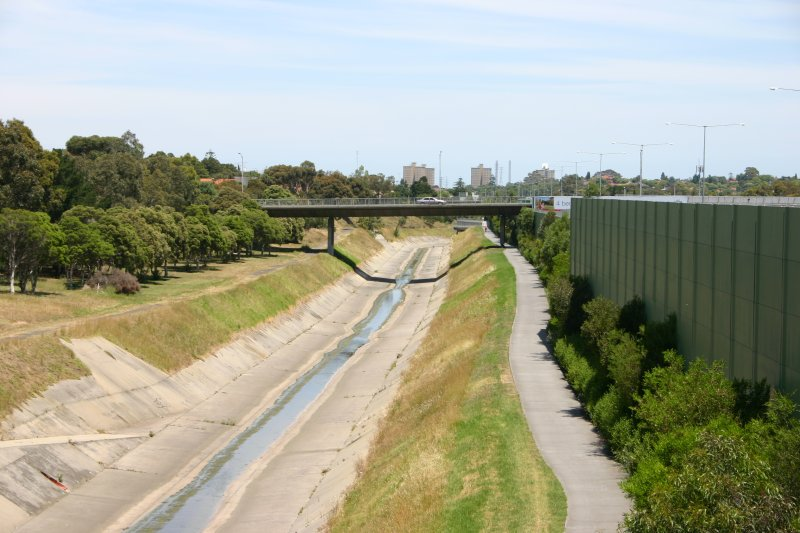
- Moonee Ponds Creek Trail running alongside Citylink
- Length: Approx 25 km
- Location: Melbourne, Victoria, Australia
- Difficulty: Easy
- Hazards: Blind corners, steep drop into creek. There is a gravel bank near Flemington Bridge Station where it is easy to slip
- Surface: Bitumen path, purpose built wooden decking in spots
- Hills: Flat
- Trains: Jacana, Pascoe Vale and Flemington Bridge stations

The Moonee Ponds Creek Trail is a shared use path for cyclists and pedestrians, which follows the Moonee Ponds Creek through the northern suburbs of Melbourne, Victoria, Australia.

== History ==
A public meeting called by State Member of Parliament for Pascoe Vale, Kelvin Thompson in 1989 to discuss Moonee Ponds Creek's future, was attended by more than 50 people and indicated active community investment in its protection and improvement. The meeting formed the Moonee Ponds Creek Association as a coordinating body for five municipal councils and three Government departments. Melbourne Water managed the plan. In 1991 a twenty kilometre bike path had already developed when these proposals to restore Moonee Ponds Creek were raised, and provisions to run the path beside the Tullamarine Freeway were announced by Thompson.

== Following the path ==
The path commences in Melbourne Docklands on Footscray Road near where the creek enters the Yarra River. The lower reaches of the path are also the route of the Capital City Trail.

The path then follows the creek, snaking under and around the Tullamarine Freeway for several kilometres. There is a short on road section through Essendon along Vanberg Road. After Bell Street it leaves the Tullamarine Freeway and heads north on the east side of Essendon Airport through a series of parks, including Boeing and Kingsford Smith Ulm reserves. Passing under the large rail trestle bridge, the trail soon arrives at the Western Ring Road and the Western Ring Road Trail.

1.3 km along to the north is Jacana Reserve, near Johnstone Street. The south end of the Broadmeadows Valley and the south end of the Broadmeadows Valley Trail are reached by crossing a small footbridge here.

Continuing on, the Moonee Ponds Creek Trail leads to Willowbrook Reserve near Mickleham Road, in Westmeadows. West of Willowbrook Reserve, the path continues along the fence line of the Woodlands Historic Park, home of Living Legends.

The north-most section in the Woodlands Historic Park is unsealed.

== Landmarks ==
- Tullamarine Freeway
- Moonee Ponds Creek
- Melbourne Docklands
- Melbourne Airport

== Connections ==
The trail intersects the Broadmeadows Valley Trail in the north. Nearby it also intersects the Western Ring Road Trail and meets the Capital City Trail in the south.

Heading east 1 km along the Western Ring Road Trail is Jacana station and further to the Merri Creek Trail at Fawkner. Heading west along the Western Ring Road Trail is Brimbank Park and the Maribyrnong River Trail.

North end at approximately 37.665319°S 144.869263°E. South end at 37.787553°S 144.939947°E.

Open Street Maps and Google Maps both state that the north end is located at a street called Marker Rd. However the official Woodlands Historic Park Visitor's Guide states that the end is near the Woodlands Homestead within the Historic Park. The Historical Park has emergency markers placed throughout. The north end of the trail, according to the visitors guide, is near the emergency Marker WHP 103. In contrast, the north end, according to the above-mentioned websites, is located just south of WHP 507.
