= Capital City Trail =

Public trail in Melbourne, Australia

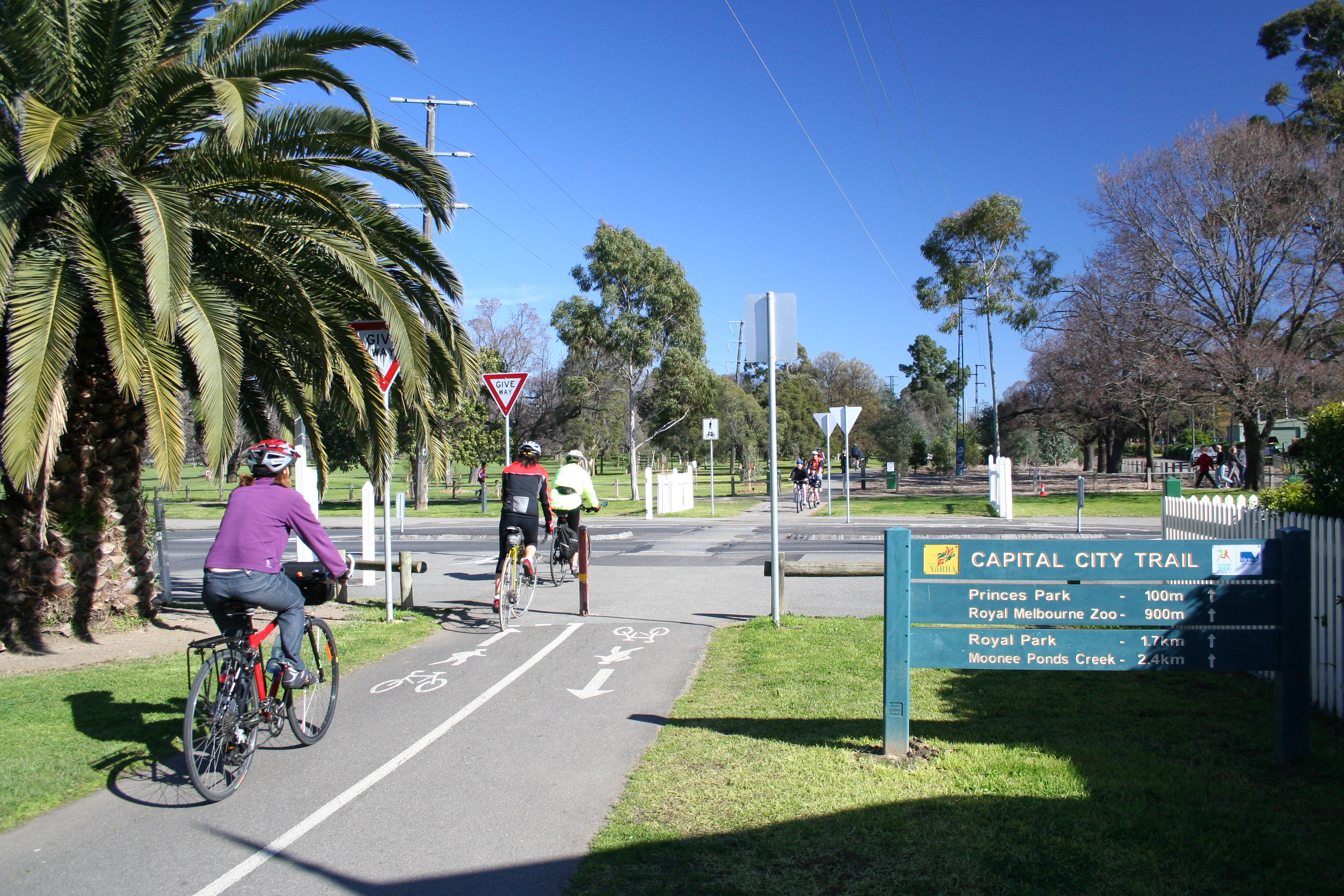
- Capital City Trail at Princes Park looking west
- Length: Approx 29 km
- Location: Melbourne, Victoria, Australia
- Difficulty: Easy
- Surface: Shared use concrete or bitumen
- Hills: Minor hill at Rushall Station
- Water: Drinking fountains every 2km approx
- Train(s): Going clockwise: Flinders Street, Southern Cross, Flemington Bridge, Rushall and Heyington stations

The Capital City Trail is a shared use path in Melbourne, Victoria, Australia, which circles the city centre and some inner eastern and northern suburbs. It is 29 km in length, and mostly consists of sections of other trails, such as the Merri Creek Trail, Main Yarra Trail, Moonee Ponds Creek Trail and Inner Circle Rail Trail.

A popular starting point for the trail is at Princes Bridge near Flinders Street station. The rider can head off in an easterly or westerly direction. If heading off in the westerly, either side of the river can be used, but the south side tends to be more popular, particularly amongst walkers and runners.

The Capital City Trail uses the same path as the Main Yarra Trail up to Dights Falls, where it continues, using the same path as the Merri Creek Trail, as part of its loop around the city.

== Following the path ==
The trail follows the Yarra River to Yarra Bend Park on the Yarra River Trail and meets Merri Creek at Dights Falls. It follows the Merri Creek Trail up the Merri Creek to Rushall Station, where it follows the former Inner Circle rail reserve and Royal Park. It then meets the Moonee Ponds Creek Trail, which continues back to Docklands and Southbank. At its farthest, the trail is 5 kilometres from the centre of Melbourne.

=== Construction ===
Recently completed improvements to the trail include a footbridge crossing Manningham Street in Parkville (which removes a flight of stairs and a road crossing), and re-paving of the path and landscaping on the section that passes under the Hurstbridge railway line. Lobby group Bicycle Network continues to advocate for improvements to the trail, notably the removal of a staircase that interrupts the path at Gipps Street in Abbotsford.

== Landmarks ==
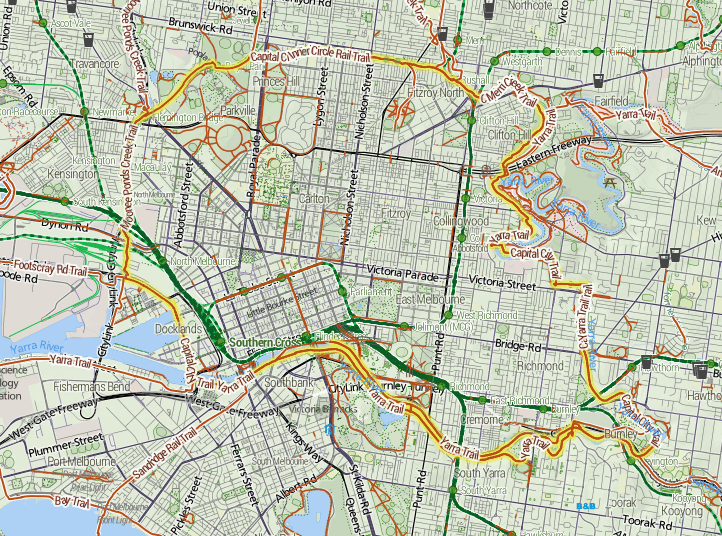
Map of the Capital City Trail, highlighted in yellow.

The trail passes by the following attractions and landmarks:

- Southbank
- Alexandra Gardens and Royal Botanic Gardens
- Melbourne Park and Melbourne Cricket Ground
- Yarra River
- Yarra Bend Park
- Collingwood Children's Farm
- Hardy Gallagher Reserve
- Merri Creek
- Rushall Garden, a community garden in North Fitzroy.
- Princes Park, location of the Ikon Park football stadium
- Royal Park
- Melbourne Zoo
- Moonee Ponds Creek
- Marvel Stadium
- Docklands

== Connections ==
The trail acts as central hub and has many spokes. Starting in the north and going clockwise there is the Upfield Rail Trail, Merri Creek Trail, Yarra River Trail, Gardiners Creek Trail, Sandridge Trail, Maribyrnong River Trail & Hobsons Bay Coastal Trail (via the Footscray Road path at Docklands) and finally the Moonee Ponds Creek Trail.

The Princes Bridge starting point is at 37.819744°S 144.968516°E.
