= Department of Infrastructure (Victoria) =

Former department in the government of Victoria, Australia

Department overview
- Formed: 3 April 1996
- Preceding agencies: Department of Planning and Development; Department of Transport I
- Dissolved: 30 April 2008
- Superseding department: Department of Transport II
- Type: Department
- Employees: 1,049 (June 2007)
- Annual budget: $4.0 billion (FY 2006–2007)
- Agency ID: PROV VA 3971

The Department of Infrastructure (DOI) was a department of the Government of Victoria, Australia. Created in significant changes to the public service enacted by Jeff Kennett after he was returned as Premier of Victoria at the 1996 state election, the DOI oversaw a variety of functions until its abolition in 2008. It was responsible for transport policy during its entire existence, and consequently played a major role in the related reforms and projects initiated by Kennett and his successors. At different times, it also had responsibility for planning, major projects, local government, energy, communications, and mining.

== Kennett government ==
The Department was created in machinery of government changes following the re-election of the Kennett government in 1996. As well as absorbing all the functions of the Department of Planning and Development and the Department of Transport, the DOI also assumed responsibility for local government.

The Kennett government's program of major transport reforms, which included privatisation of the public transport network, a new partially-automated ticketing system, and construction of Melbourne's first privately-owned toll road, caused significant tension between the DOI and the Transport Reform Unit (TRU) within the Department of Treasury and Finance. DOI staff expressed concerns that the TRU was effectively running the state's transport network and delegating only minor operational concerns to the DOI and its agencies.

The model adopted by the TRU for the transport privatisation saw the Public Transport Corporation divided into five corporate business units: two each covering the metropolitan tram and train networks, and one for the V/Line country passenger and freight businesses. The metropolitan operations were transferred to private control by a franchise arrangement with the state retaining ownership of the assets. Although the TRU had intended a similar approach for V/Line, it altered the arrangements under pressure from potential bidders by vertically and horizontally disaggregating the system, and sold the freight operations and non-fixed assets outright with a long-term lease on the track and infrastructure to the Freight Victoria consortium, while franchising the passenger operations separately. The residual functions of the PTC, including monitoring of the contracts, were transferred to the Director of Public Transport, a new statutory office within the DOI.

The Office of Local Government was merged into the Strategic Planning unit of the DOI late in 1998 following complaints from municipal councils that the state government's negotiations with them had been "patronising". The head of the Office was also removed from his role, although the DOI secretary denied the change was a demotion.

== Bracks and Brumby governments ==
During the campaign for the 1999 state election, opposition leader Steve Bracks said he would merge the DOI with the Department of State Development to create a Department of State and Regional Development. Following the election of the Bracks government, however, the merger did not take place, although Bracks immediately removed Kennett's DOI secretary; the Department of State Development was renamed as Bracks had promised but without substantial change to its functions. When it was abolished in March 2002, its major projects responsibility was transferred to the DOI.

The DOI played a major role in delivery of the Bracks' government's transport projects, such as the Regional Fast Rail project (RFR), and redevelopment of Spencer Street railway station. Because privatisation had left the DOI with little experience of major project procurement, it allowed companies tendering for the RFR works packages considerable freedom in determining how to meet travel time targets set by the state government, and used the expertise of external consultants to assess the suitability of bids. The DOI and its Rail Projects group were later heavily criticised for this approach, both for the costs of employing external consultants and for engineering solutions which proved to be poorly understood.

The Victorian Ombudsman began a major investigation into DOI staff and processes in 2002 after a series of requests for documents made by the Opposition and journalists under freedom of information laws were delayed or denied. Ministerial advisers and senior officers of the Department overturn previously approved releases of information. Several DOI projects commenced under the Bracks government were criticised by the Auditor-General in a 2004 report, which found the Department had planned and managed them poorly, leading to significant cost blowouts.

Although the Bracks government had come to power in 1999 promising significant public transport investment, the structure of the DOI continued to reflect an ingrained dependence on roads in the transport portfolio. VicRoads, although nominally under the control of the Department, was the only transport agency reporting directly to the minister, and the road corporation also maintained significant informal influence at all levels of government. The Director of Public Transport, on the other hand, sat deep within the DOI, with little power to advocate for major projects or carry out long-term planning. By 2005, transport experts had begun to call for reform of the DOI to bring public transport onto a "more even footing" with road construction. In contrast to the original aims of the DOI, land use planning had also been transferred to the Department of Sustainability and Environment, leaving the transport systems isolated from urban structure planning.

After the 2006 state election, energy policy was transferred from the DOI to the Department of Primary Industries.

In 2007, after a significant rise in metropolitan rail patronage went unmatched by service increases, the Department's complex structure without obvious accountability for public transport was again criticised. Moreover, transport experts argued a "negative and defeatist culture" within the bureaucracy was preventing it from being able to plan and deliver even simple projects.

On 28 April 2008, Premier John Brumby announced the DOI would be abolished, with its transport functions taken over by a new Department of Transport and its major project function transferred to the Department of Innovation, Industry and Regional Development.
