= Ministry of Transport (Victoria) =

Former ministry in the government of Victoria, Australia

Ministry of Transport Department of Transport
Department overview
- Formed: 1951
- Dissolved: 1996
- Superseding department: Department of Infrastructure
- Type: Ministry
- Key documents: Transport Act 1951; Ministry of Transport Act 1958; Transport Act 1983
- Agency ID: PROV VA 673

The Ministry of Transport, later known as the Department of Transport, was a statutory ministry that acted as the chief transport agency of the Government of Victoria between 1958 and 1996. Originally established by the Transport Act 1951 and strengthened by the Transport Act 1983, the Ministry took on a variety of roles, coordinating the state's other transport operations and reporting to a number of Ministers throughout its history.

== Background ==
The earliest transport authorities in Victoria operated under the purview of the Board of Land and Works, an innovative structure created to administer public service departments and authorities with some independence from government. Although these departments continued to be responsible to ministers in Parliament, they were effectively controlled by the Board in their day-to-day operations. Later, other statutory authorities such as the Victorian Railways (VR), Melbourne and Metropolitan Tramways Board (MMTB) and Country Roads Board (CRB) were established independently from the Board of Land and Works, but remained at arm's length from the elected government well into the 20th century.

However, in the early decades of the 20th century the fragmented nature of the transport administration became apparent. One of the symptoms was private bus services, which competed with the state railway system for passengers on lightly trafficked routes and hindered the financial viability of many railway lines. In 1928, the government of Premier Edmond Hogan proposed heavy regulation of road transport services by a new Ministry of Transport, to be jointly overseen by the chairmen of the VR, MMTB and CRB. The policy was strongly opposed by motor industry groups, and The Age and The Argus argued that the remit and structure of the proposed Ministry was so vague it would not be able to efficiently resolve the clashes between sectors. Hogan struggled throughout 1929 and 1930 to win political support for a bill to constitute the Ministry, and parliamentary committees heard requests for substantial amendments from railway and road interests. Eventually, in December 1931, Hogan conceded the bill was too controversial to pass, and it was withdrawn.

As motor traffic continued to grow, the problems Hogan had foreseen worsened without coordination of transport policy. The Age editorialised in favour of a centralised Ministry of Transport in 1937, arguing that it would be "one of the first steps towards the proper handling of the problems of traffic and transport". By 1938, similar ministries had been established in other states and territories, as well as New Zealand, and the concept gained political support in Victoria.

Following the Second World War, the need for improved coordination of transport services became more apparent. Rail and road services were stretched to capacity in some areas after a lack of wartime investment, but in others, services operated by different agencies competed for passengers and goods.

== Initial establishment ==
In 1951, the government of Premier John McDonald introduced a bill to the Parliament to establish a Ministry of Transport to coordinate the various semi-autonomous authorities which controlled aspects of transport policy at the time. The bill established an office of Co-ordinator of Transport responsible to the Minister. The Co-ordinator was empowered to employ his own staff or to take charge of staff of any of the existing transport authorities. At the establishment of the Ministry, the authorities for which it was responsible included the Victorian Railways, the Railway Construction Branch of the Board of Land and Works, the Transport Regulation Board, the Country Roads Board, the Melbourne & Metropolitan Tramways Board, and the State Electricity Commission of Victoria, which operated several railway and road facilities. The bill also regulated interstate air traffic for the first time, since air transport had previously not fallen within the responsibility of any of the transport authorities.

Although the government had initially considered merging the transport authorities into a single operating organisation within the Ministry, such a structure was considered too complex and the eventual bill provided for a Ministry focused merely on coordination of services. Commissioners of the various authorities retained significant autonomy in their operations.

Minister of Transport Herbert Hyland, in his second reading speech introducing the bill, said:

[T]he Government has reached the conclusion that the essential first step towards obtaining more satisfactory governmental control [over transport] must be to bring all statutes and administrative authorities concerned with these matters under one Minister. This has then led to the conclusion that an over-all administrative authority is necessary to advise and assist the Minister in developing progressive policies over transport as a whole. Transport is a vital factor in our economy and community life. The very growth of the modern economy has throughout been a question of transportation, so that to-day possibly the prime factor in world economy, as in the economy of any particular community, is the efficiency with which goods, materials and persons can be moved from place to place in accordance with economic demand.

The bill was passed and proclaimed as the Transport Act 1951. Hyland was knighted in 1952 on the recommendation of McDonald, largely due to his efforts in conceiving and establishing the Ministry.

The Ministry's responsibilities were consolidated by the Ministry of Transport Act 1958. The title of Co-ordinator was also later changed to that of Director of Transport.

Other transport agencies which reported to the Ministry over the following years included the Railway Construction Board, from the abolition of the Board of Land and Works in 1965; the Melbourne Underground Rail Loop Authority; and the West Gate Bridge Authority.

In 1981, the Ministry gained responsibility for traffic management and vehicle registration, which had previously been under the Ministry for Police and Emergency Services.

== Re-establishment and strengthening ==
The passage of the Transport Act 1983 resulted in significant changes to government transport organisations. All of the Ministry's authorities were abolished and reconstituted into four new agencies: the Metropolitan Transit Authority and State Transport Authority assumed responsibility for Melbourne and regional public transport services respectively; and the Road Traffic Authority and Road Construction Authority were placed in charge of road management and infrastructure. At the same time, the Ministry became the lead planning and coordinating agency, as well as the administrator of all transport-related property, and the name of its head was altered to Director-General.

In 1984, the Ministry began to brand itself and its programs as Victoria Transport, and, in May 1985, it moved to new headquarters at Transport House in Collins Street.

Another substantial change to the Ministry's functions occurred in 1989 when the MTA and STA were merged into the Public Transport Corporation, and the RCA and RTA were merged into the Roads Corporation. The merged authorities reported directly to the Director-General of Transport instead of to the Minister, strengthening the role of the Ministry in coordinating their functions.

== Kennett government changes ==
After the election of a government led by Premier Jeff Kennett at the 1992 state election, the Ministry was renamed the Department of Transport. It also assumed responsibility for ports from the abolished Department of Manufacturing and Industry Development.

== Abolition ==
The Department was abolished in 1996 in further machinery of government changes following the re-election of the Kennett government. Its functions were absorbed by the newly created Department of Infrastructure. The changes took place at the same time as the government released its major transport strategy, intended to integrate land-use planning with transport functions.
