= Broadmeadows Valley Trail =

Shared use path in Melbourne, Australia

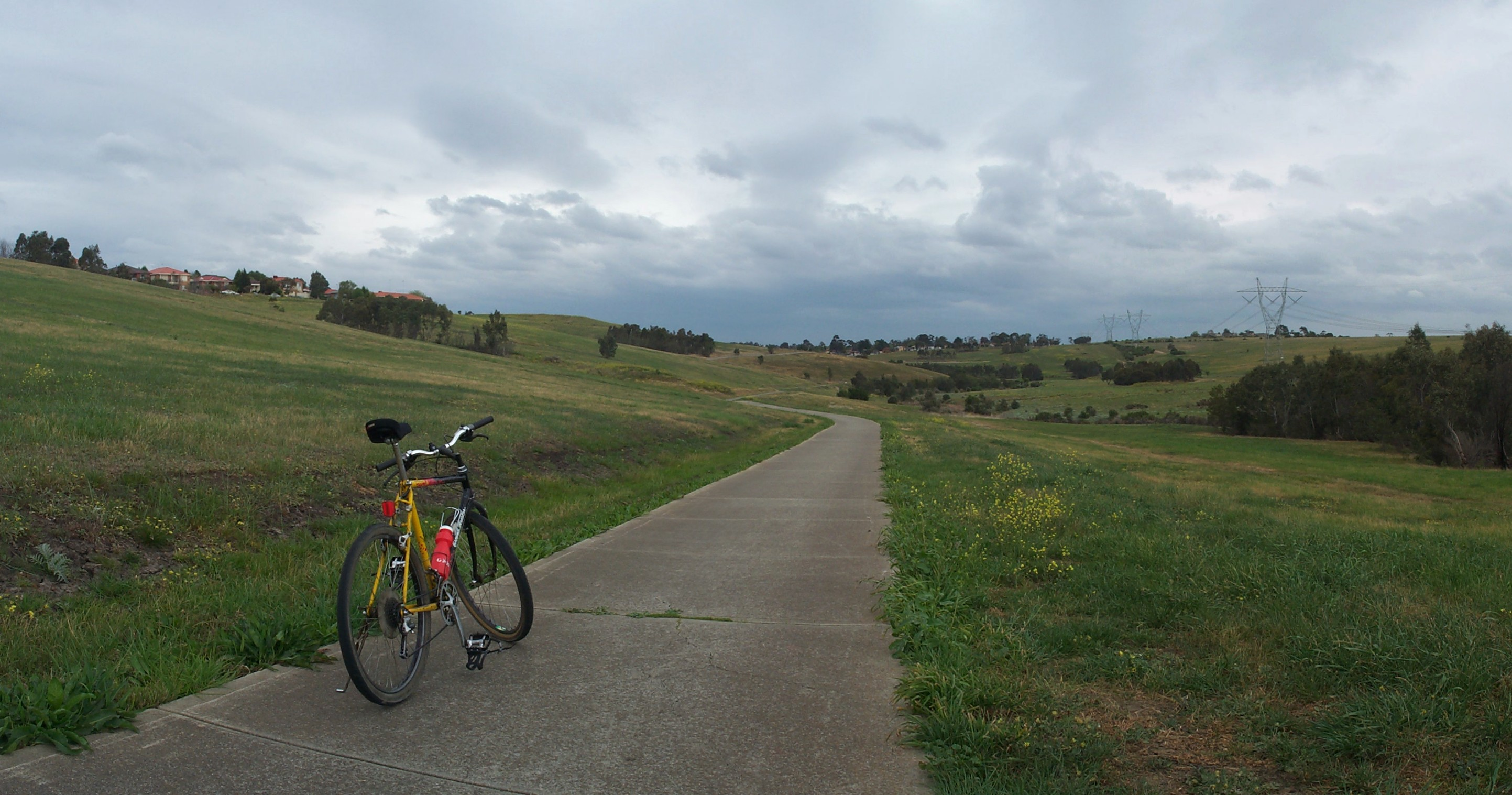
- A view looking down the valley to the south.
- Length: 14.3 km
- Location: Melbourne, Victoria, Australia
- Difficulty: Medium
- Hills: Some uphill work when heading north
- Train: Craigieburn line

The Broadmeadows Valley Trail is a shared use path for cyclists and pedestrians in the outer northern suburbs of Melbourne, Victoria, Australia.

== Route ==
The northern end of the trail is most easily accessed from Craigieburn railway station. It begins at the intersection of Stockton Street and Aitken Creek near the station.

Aitken Creek runs 1.8 km, reaching the back entrance gate of the Craigieburn Public Golf Course, heading south via Axminster Drive which becomes a path created from the ends of a series of cul-de-sacs. Approximately 1 km from Aitken Creek, a small wetland is encountered. A large solitary palm can be visible. The path heads towards the palm, then continues along a short goat track on its far side, which crosses a narrow easement.

In Roxburgh Park, the path winds around some streets, crosses an open area, and then runs between contemporary terrace-style houses. It enters an open park area, where the path forms a figure of eight. At the south end of the park, the path passes through a distinct line of trees running east to west and crosses a large power transmission line easement. Avoid heading east at this point and continue south.

The path then runs for another 8 km through a navigable section and reaches Johnstone Street in Westmeadows. Passing a couple of ovals on the left, the path arrives at a footbridge about 0.4 km from Johnstone Street. Cross the bridge to join the Moonee Ponds Creek Trail.

== Connections ==
- The electrified railway service to Craigieburn railway station commenced on 30 September 2007, along with a new station at Roxburgh Park on Somerton Road - Roxburgh Park railway station.
- The route terminates to the north at Stockton Street.
- It continues west as the Aitken Creek Trail, passing through the Craigieburn Public Golf Course.
- To the south, it intersects with the Yuroke Creek Trail near Cassinia Crescent in Meadow Heights.
- Further south, it connects with the Moonee Ponds Creek Trail.
- The northern end is located at 37.606234°S 144.941659°E.
- The southern end is located at 37.683859°S 144.903064°E.
