= M80 Trail =

Shared use path in Melbourne, Australia

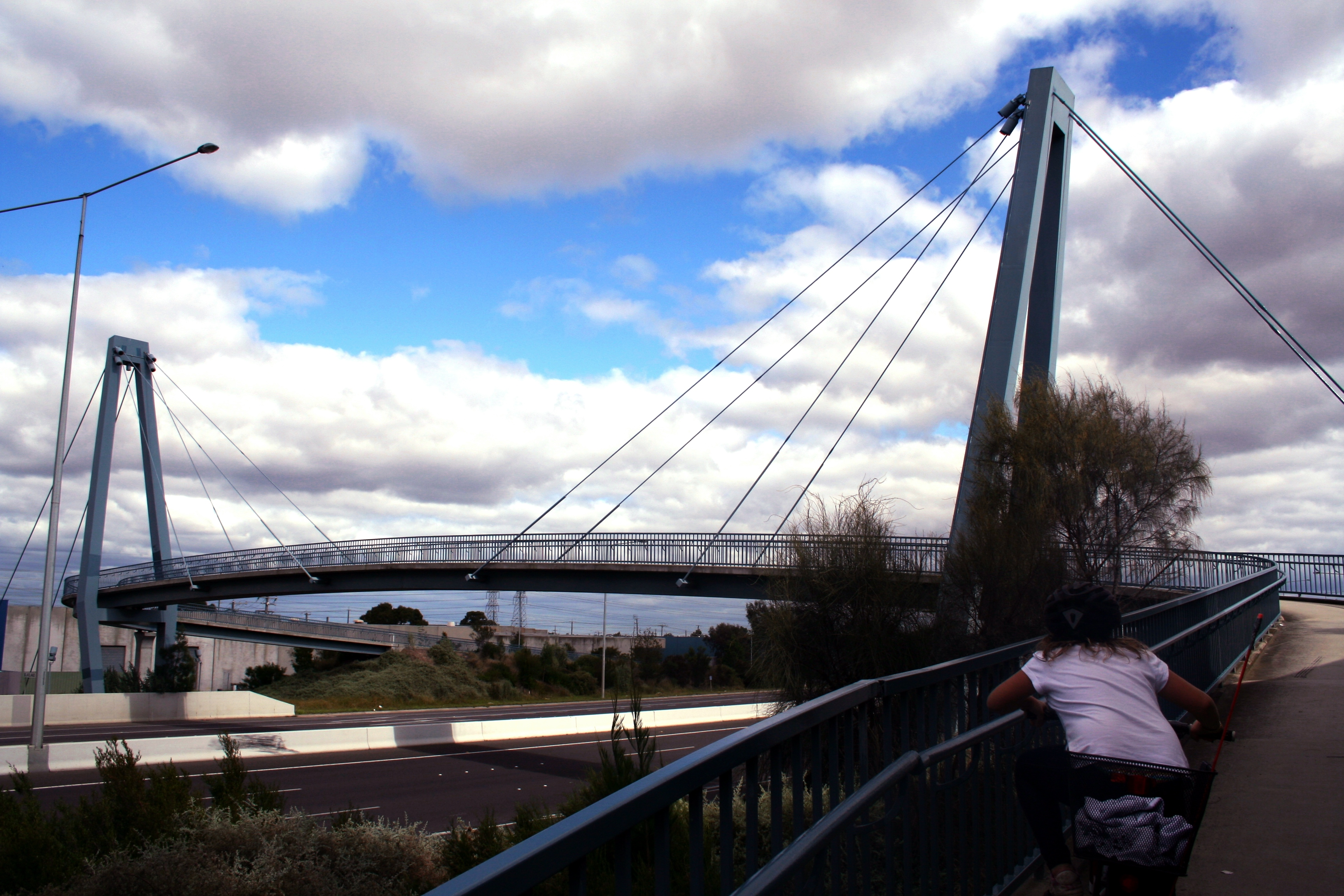
- M80 Trail footbridge located in Thomastown
- Length: 43km
- Location: Melbourne, Victoria, Australia
- Difficulty: Easy
- Hazards: Broken glass, magpies during breeding season
- Surface: Bitumen and concrete
- Hills: Occasional small hilly sections, large hill (heading west) in Greensborough
- Trains: Ginifer, Jacana, Thomastown, Greensborough

The M80 Trail (previously known as the Western Ring Road Trail) is a shared-use path for cyclists and pedestrians that bridges the northern suburbs and follows the Western Ring Road/Metropolitan Ring Road (M80) freeway in Melbourne, Australia.

== Route ==
The western end of the path begins at the end of Merino Street in Sunshine West, branching off from the Federation Trail.

The path then runs approximately parallel to the Western Ring Road. The path's route passes Keilor Park Drive, Malvern and Coventry Streets, and Jacana Railway Station. There are also intersections with Moonee Ponds Creek Trail and Craigieburn Bypass Trail.

The eastern end of the path begins at the roundabout intersection of Diamond Creek Road, the Greensborough Bypass and Civic Drive in Greensborough, 1.2km east of the Plenty River Trail turnoff.

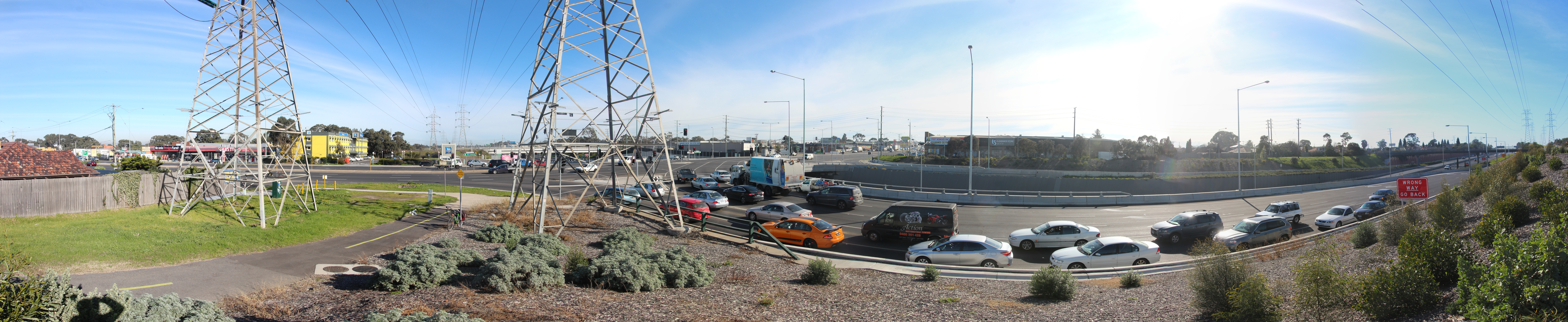
A panorama of the Western Ring Road Trail where it crosses Sydney Road at Fawkner. Photo by John Englart

== Connections ==
Going from West to East: Federation Trail, Wellness Trail, Kororoit Creek Trail, Maribyrnong River Trail, Steele Creek Trail, Moonee Ponds Creek Trail, Merri Creek Trail, Craigieburn Bypass Trail, Edgars Creek Trail, St Georges Rd Trail, Darebin Creek Trail north then Darebin Creek Trail south, Greensborough Bypass Trail and Plenty River Trail.

West end is at 37.825027°S 144.809997°E. East end is at 37.689338°S 145.112656°E.
