= Jacana railway station =

Railway station in Glenroy, Melbourne, Victoria, Australia

Jacana
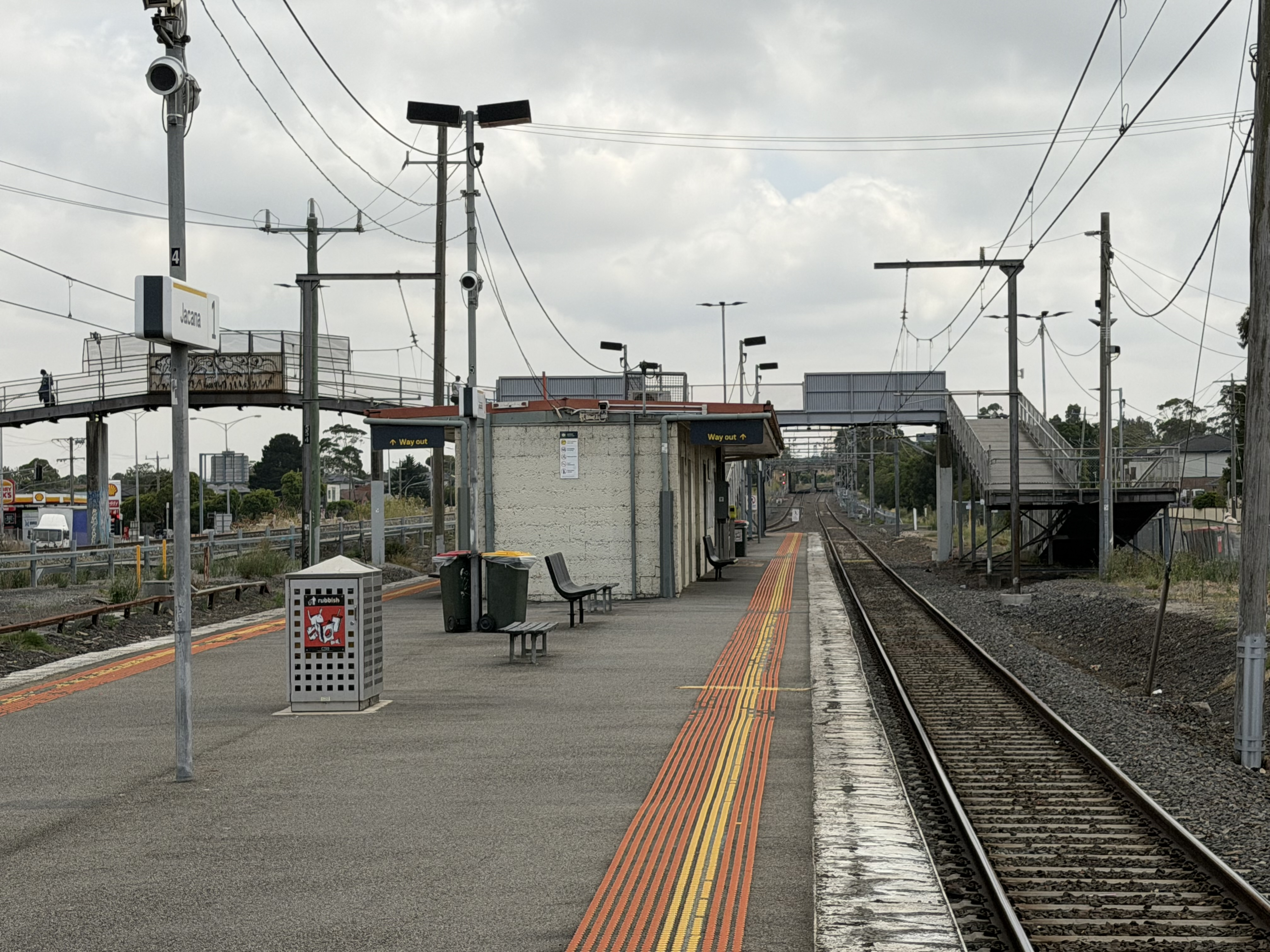
- Northbound view from Platform 1, January 2026

General information
- Location: Pascoe Vale Road, Glenroy, Victoria 3046; City of Merri-bek; Australia
- Coordinates: 37°41′42″S 144°54′57″E
- System: PTV commuter rail station
- Owner: VicTrack
- Operator: Metro Trains
- Line: Craigieburn
- Distance: 15.43 kilometres from Southern Cross
- Platforms: 2 (1 island)
- Tracks: 2

Construction
- Structure type: Ground
- Accessible: No – steep ramp

Other information
- Status: Operational, unstaffed
- Station code: JAC
- Fare zone: Myki zone 2
- Website: Public Transport Victoria

History
- Opened: 15 February 1959; 67 years ago
- Electrified: September 1921 (1500 V DC overhead)

Passengers
2005–2018 numbers
2005–2006	84,247
2006–2007	91,548 ▲8.66%
2007–2008	96,753 ▲5.68%
2008–2009	137,596 ▲42.21%
2009–2010	148,646 ▲8.03%
2010–2011	145,636 ▼2.02%
2011–2012	123,092 ▼15.48%
2012–2013	Not measured
2013–2014	80,120 ▼34.91%
2014–2015	104,141 ▲29.98%
2015–2016	139,307 ▲33.76%
2016–2017	160,140 ▲14.95%
2017–2018	197,118 ▲23.09%
- 2018–2019: 226,809 ▲15.06%
- 2019–2020: 221,650 ▼2.27%
- 2020–2021: 129,500 ▼41.57%
- 2021–2022: 133,250 ▲2.89%
- 2022–2023: 176,700 ▲32.61%
- 2023–2024: 215,600 ▲22.01%

Services
Preceding station	Metro Trains	Following station
Glenroy towards Flinders Street	Craigieburn line	Broadmeadows towards Craigieburn
Track layout
Location

Jacana station is a railway station operated by Metro Trains Melbourne on the Craigieburn line, part of the Melbourne rail network. It serves the northern suburb of Glenroy in Melbourne, Victoria, Australia. Jacana is a ground-level unstaffed station, featuring an island platform with two faces. It opened on 15 February 1959.

The North East standard gauge line is located to the west of the station, crossing the broad gauge suburban lines via a flyover at the Craigieburn (down) end of the station. The Albion-Jacana freight line joins the main suburban line after the flyover, and the Western Ring Road passes under the station via a short tunnel.

== History ==
Jacana station opened on 15 February 1959, a number of years before the Housing Commission started construction of its nearby Jacana estate. The station, like the suburb itself, appears to get its name from a nearby street in neighbouring Broadmeadows.

The railway past the site of Jacana originally opened in 1872, as part of the North East line to School House Lane. In July 1958, construction of the station began, with the slewing of the down line occurring on 13 September of that year to make room for the island platform, as well as the flyover for the standard gauge line, which was under construction at the same time.

On 17 December 1972, the station was damaged by fire. Three days later, on 20 December, 10 wagons on a Sydney-bound freight train on the standard gauge line derailed immediately west of the station. The pedestrian overpass at the station was damaged during the derailment, but was repaired by 24 December. Much of the debris resulting from the derailment was also cleared by that date.

In 1975, the current overpass on Pascoe Vale Road, to the west of the station, was provided, replacing an earlier overpass.

On 14 November 1996, two Comeng train sets collided between Broadmeadows and Jacana, injuring 13 people. A city-bound train collided with a stationary Broadmeadows-bound train, and two carriages derailed.

== Platforms and services ==
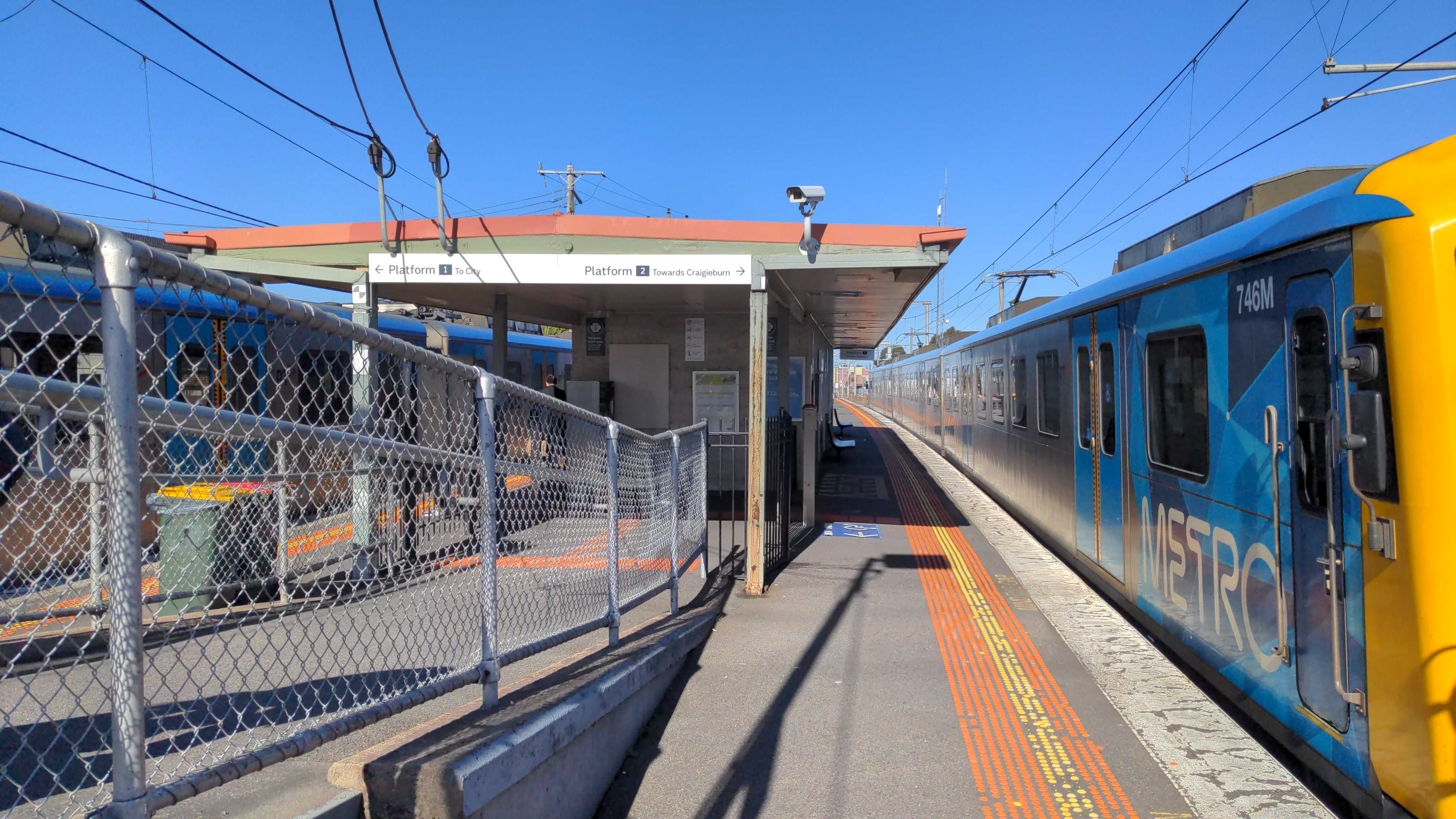
Southbound view from Platform 2, with two Siemens Nexas trains on Craigieburn and City services occupying both platforms, December 2023

Jacana has one island platform with two faces. It is served by Craigieburn line trains.

Jacana platform arrangement
Platform	Line	Destination	Via	Service Type	Notes	Source
1	Craigieburn line	Flinders Street	City Loop	All stations	See City Loop for operating patterns	
2	Craigieburn line	Craigieburn		All stations		
