= Westgarthtown, Victoria =

Coordinates: 37°40′18″S 145°0′31″E

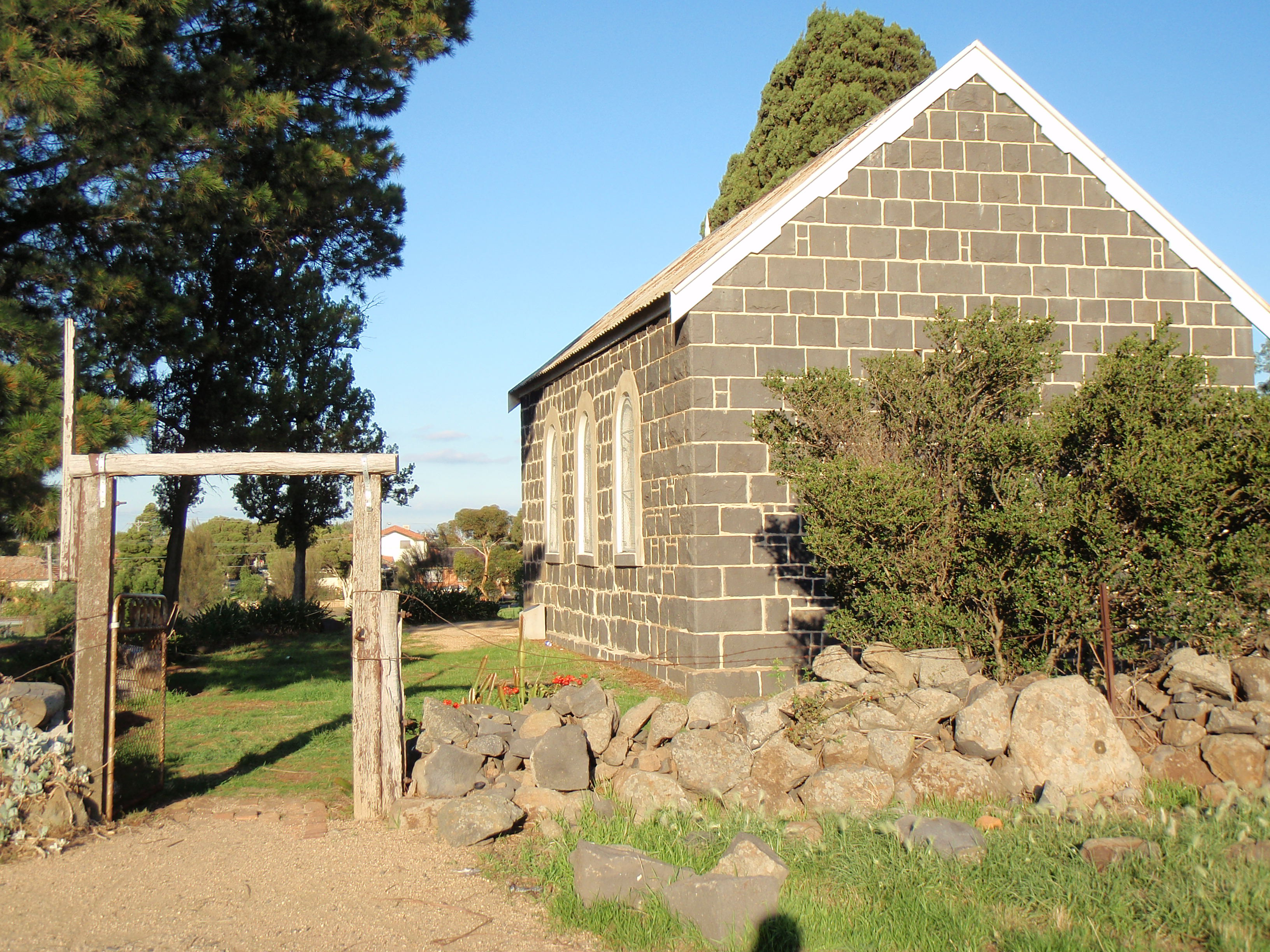
The Lutheran Church (1856) at the top of the hill

Westgarthtown is a heritage registered precinct located within the Melbourne suburbs of Thomastown and Lalor, in Victoria, Australia.

== History ==
The town was originally known as Neu Mecklenburg, and was established around 1850. The name was changed to Westgarthtown in honour of William Westgarth, who sponsored German immigration. The name was still in use up until the First World War, when it became officially regarded as part of Thomastown.

== Modern day ==
In the 1970s, urban sprawl caught up with the village, and though it is now surrounded by suburban housing, the village is protected by the Victorian Heritage Act.

Significant remaining buildings and sites include:

- The Lutheran Church (1856)
- Westgarthtown Cemetery (1850)
- Ziebell's Farm
- Graff's Farm (1873)
- Siebel's Farm (1860)
- Maltzahn's Farmhouse
- Wuchatsch's Farmhouse

Four residential properties in Westgarthtown are listed on the Victorian Heritage Register.

In 2018, Friends of Westgarthtown successfully completed the Museum Accreditation Program. This is a gold-standard program which promotes best practice across all areas of museum management in line with the National Standards for Museums and Galleries.

== See also ==
- Grovedale, Victoria, a suburb of Geelong also originally known as Germantown.
- Australian place names changed from German names
