= Merri Creek Trail =

Public trail in Melbourne, Australia

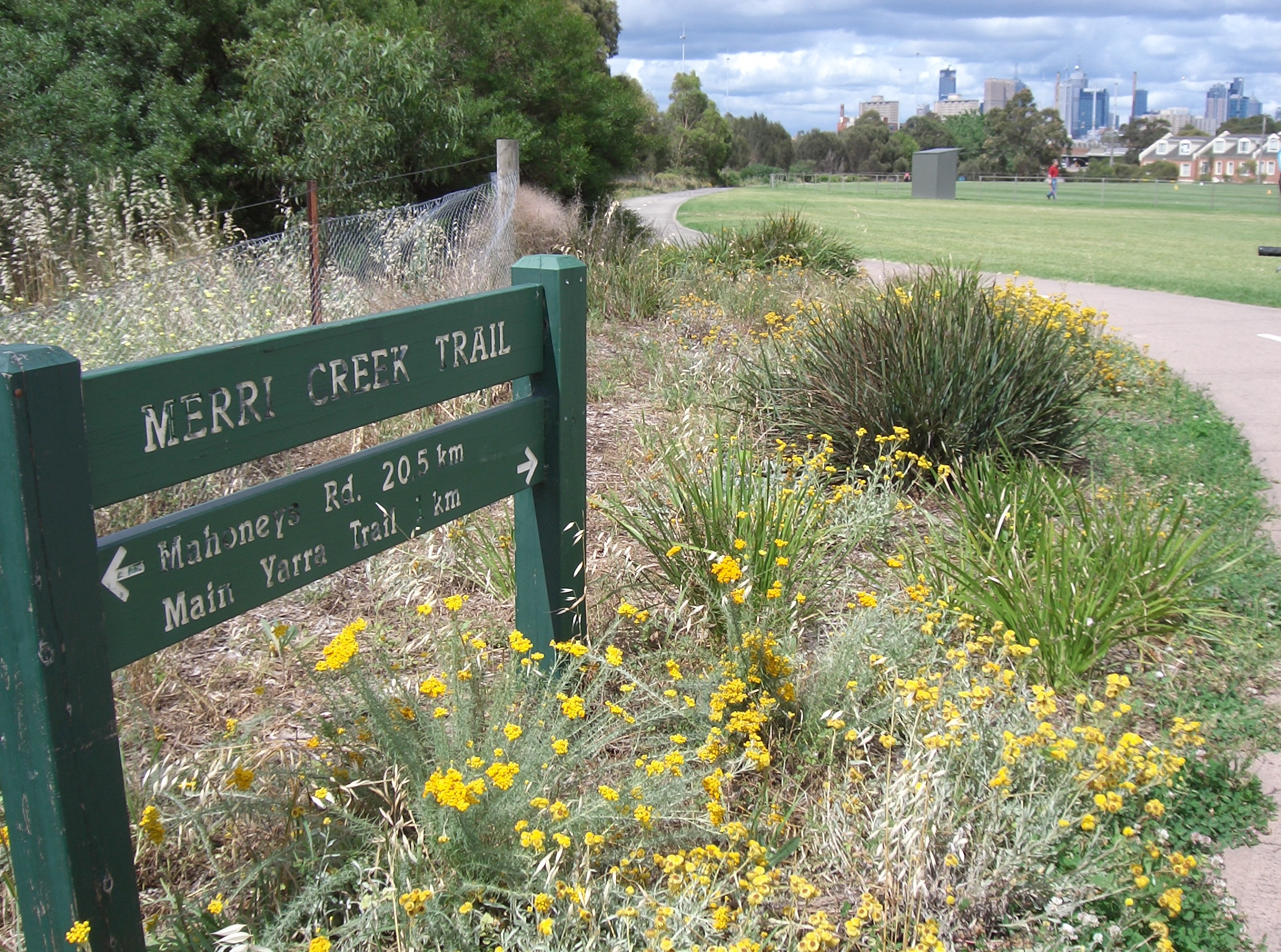
- Looking towards the city at Quarries Park
- Length: 21 km (13 mi)
- Location: Melbourne, Victoria, Australia
- Difficulty: Easy
- Hazards: Some blind corners, steep drop into creek, dog droppings on and beside trail, snakes
- Surface: Shared use concrete path
- Hills: Undulating

The Merri Creek Trail is a shared use path for cyclists and pedestrians that follows the Merri Creek through the northern suburbs of Melbourne, Australia.

== History ==
The first section of the Trail was opened in 1985 by the Prime Minister of Australia and the local member of Parliament, Bob Hawke.

In April 2010, connections to the Capital City Trail were improved with the addition of a new bridge across Merri Creek, 160m south of the junction of Union Street and Merri Parade.

== Setting ==
The route is now sealed along its entirety, with the last unsealed sections replaced in 2008. Along the way it passes CERES, the Brunswick velodrome and the Coburg Lake park.

The Merri Creek Trail starts at Dights Falls and follows the Merri Creek until it meets the Western Ring Road Trail. Heading west leads to the Moonee Ponds Creek Trail, Brimbank Park and the Maribyrnong River Trail. La Trobe University Bundoora campus can be accessed by following the trail east.

== Landmarks ==
- CERES Community Park
- Brunswick Velodrome
- Coburg Lake
- HM Prison Pentridge
- Merri Creek Labyrinth

== Connections ==
- The path joins the Western Ring Road Trail in the north.
- In the south, it meets the Yarra River Trail.

North end at 37.694670°S 144.967497°E. South end at 37.783139°S 144.992628°E.

== Gallery ==
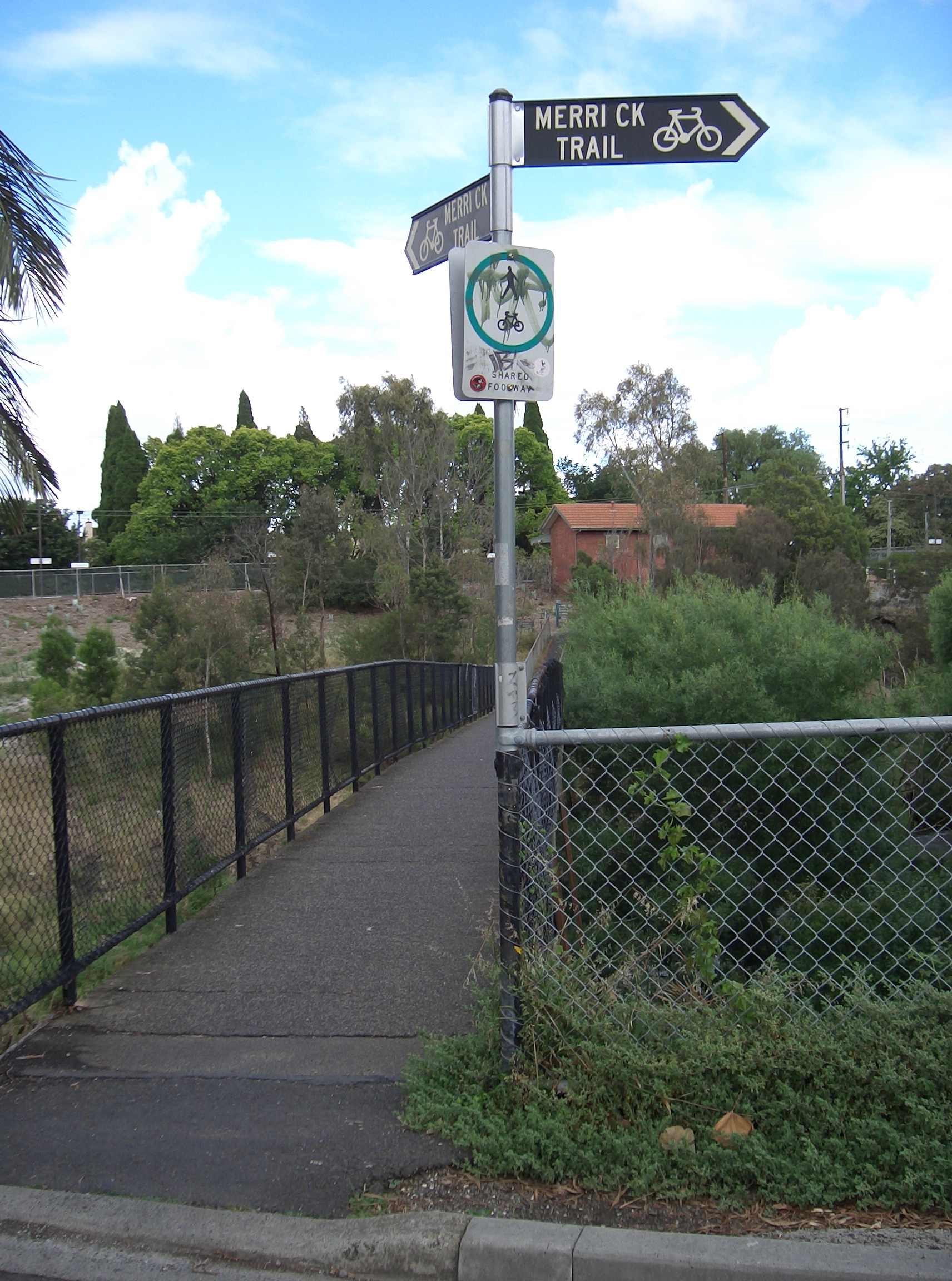
Footbridge to Rushall railway station

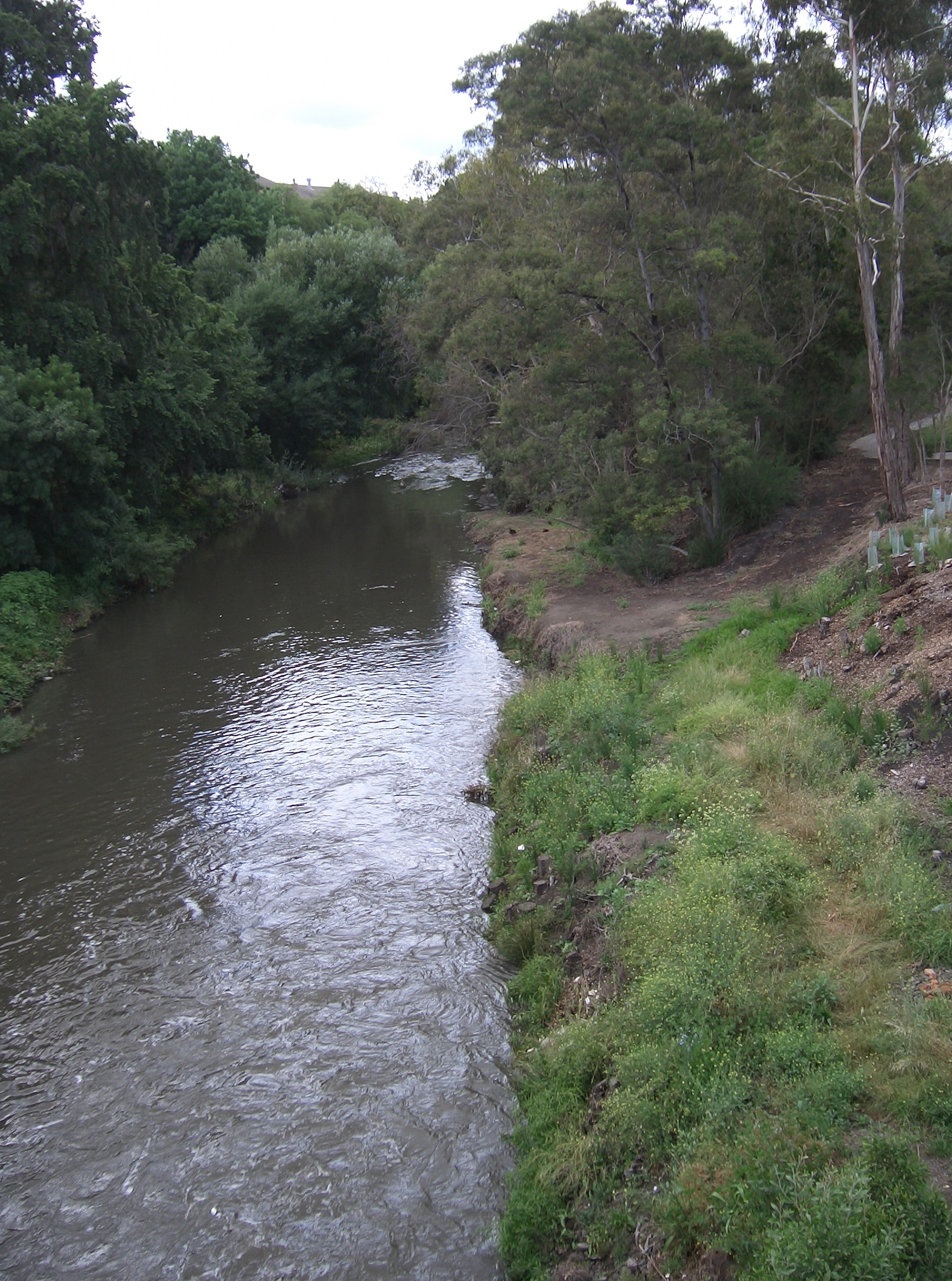
Revegetation
