= Maribyrnong River Trail =

Shared use path in Melbourne, Australia

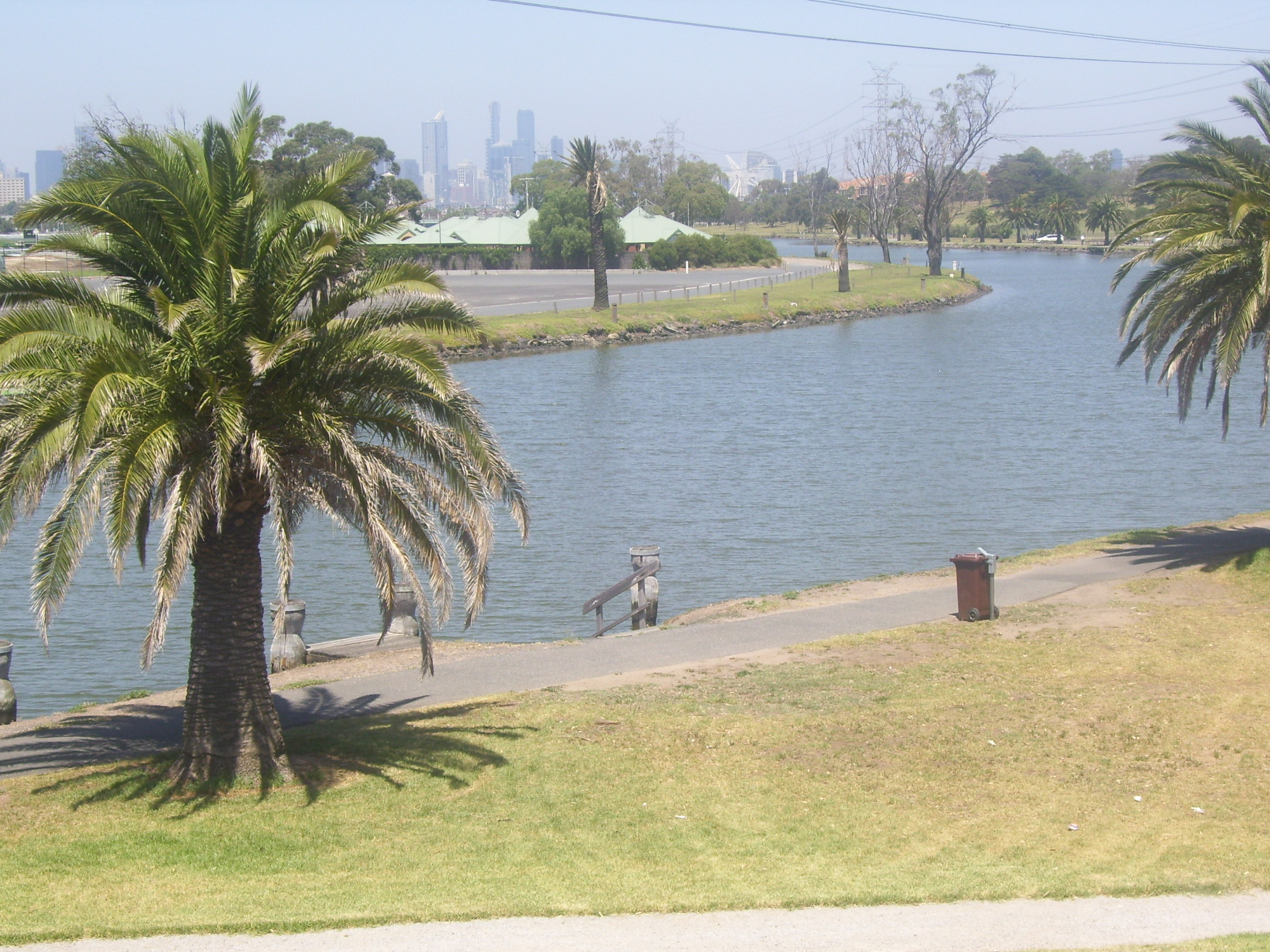
- View of city skyline and the Maribyrnong River Trail in Footscray
- Length: 25km Brimbank Park to Footscray Road
- Location: Melbourne, Victoria, Australia
- Difficulty: Mostly easy
- Hazards: Some steep descents and sharp bends, narrow trail and limited visibility at Maribyrnong Rd underpass
- Surface: Gravel, bitumen and concrete path.
- Hills: Mostly Flat, hills around Steele Creek, Essendon West
- Water: Brimbank Park, Canning Reserve, Riverside Park, Pipemakers Park, Footscray Park
- Trains: Ginifer via Western Ring Road Trail, Newmarket via the Newmarket saleyards redevelopment, Footscray

The Maribyrnong River Trail is a shared use path for cyclists and pedestrians, which follows the Maribyrnong River through the north western suburbs of Melbourne, Victoria, Australia.

The path, sometimes along both sides of the river, follows the meandering of the Maribyrnong River through a valley cut in the basaltic plateau in Keilor East at Brimbank Park, then across a floodplain to its entry into the Yarra River at Docklands. The path provides a continuous cycle path (with some road crossings) from the north west suburbs toward Melbourne's CBD.

Combined with the Taylors Creek Trail and the Footscray Road off-road path, this trail makes for an easy ride linking together the City of Brimbank, Docklands and the Melbourne City Centre.

== Following the Path ==
Starting at the north end of Brimbank Park, the gravel trail winds its way through the trees along the valley on the east side of the Maribyrnong River and the western end of the park. It passes under the towering EJ Whitten Bridge. Near the bridge base a steep path loops up to the same level as the bridge platform, where it connects to the Western Ring Road Trail.

The path then proceeds through riverside parkland alongside suburbs such as North Sunshine and Maidstone before reaching Canning Tea Gardens Reserve in Avondale Heights.

At Canning Reserve Tea Gardens at Avondale Heights the trail becomes concrete and remains concrete for the next 6 km to Footscray. The path splits into a concrete path that follows the valley of a minor creek (now part of the Milleara Road drain) up into Avondale Heights to Monte Carlo Drive Reserve. The main trail, a gravel path, continues along the river. This section of the trail adjoins grassy areas, and sightings of snakes such as the eastern brown snake, on this riverside section of the trail are not uncommon in warmer months

Near the confluence of Maribyrnong River and Steele Creek at Essendon West the path becomes concrete and follows Steele creek inland before winding up the hillside to the top of the plateau at Lily St for outstanding views of the Maribyrnong River and the skyscrapers of the Melbourne CBD in the distance. Care needs to be taken crossing Buckley Street if turning off to Steele Creek Trail that connects at this point.

The path enters a switch back section that winds back down to the river, through the Afton Street Conservation Reserve. Further is Afton Street footbridge, from which point the trail runs down both banks of the river, down to the Ascot Vale golf course. Pipemakers Park footbridge (a red coloured bridge at Newsom Street) provides another connection south of the Maribyrnong Road bridge.

At Maribyrnong the path passes through Pipemakers Park with Melbourne's Living Museum of the West, which contains historical presentations on the river valley and the people who have lived there since its initial occupation up to 40,000 years ago by the Wurundjeri people.

The path passes Flemington Racecourse, where the Melbourne Cup is run on the first Tuesday of November each year as part of the Spring Racing Carnival.

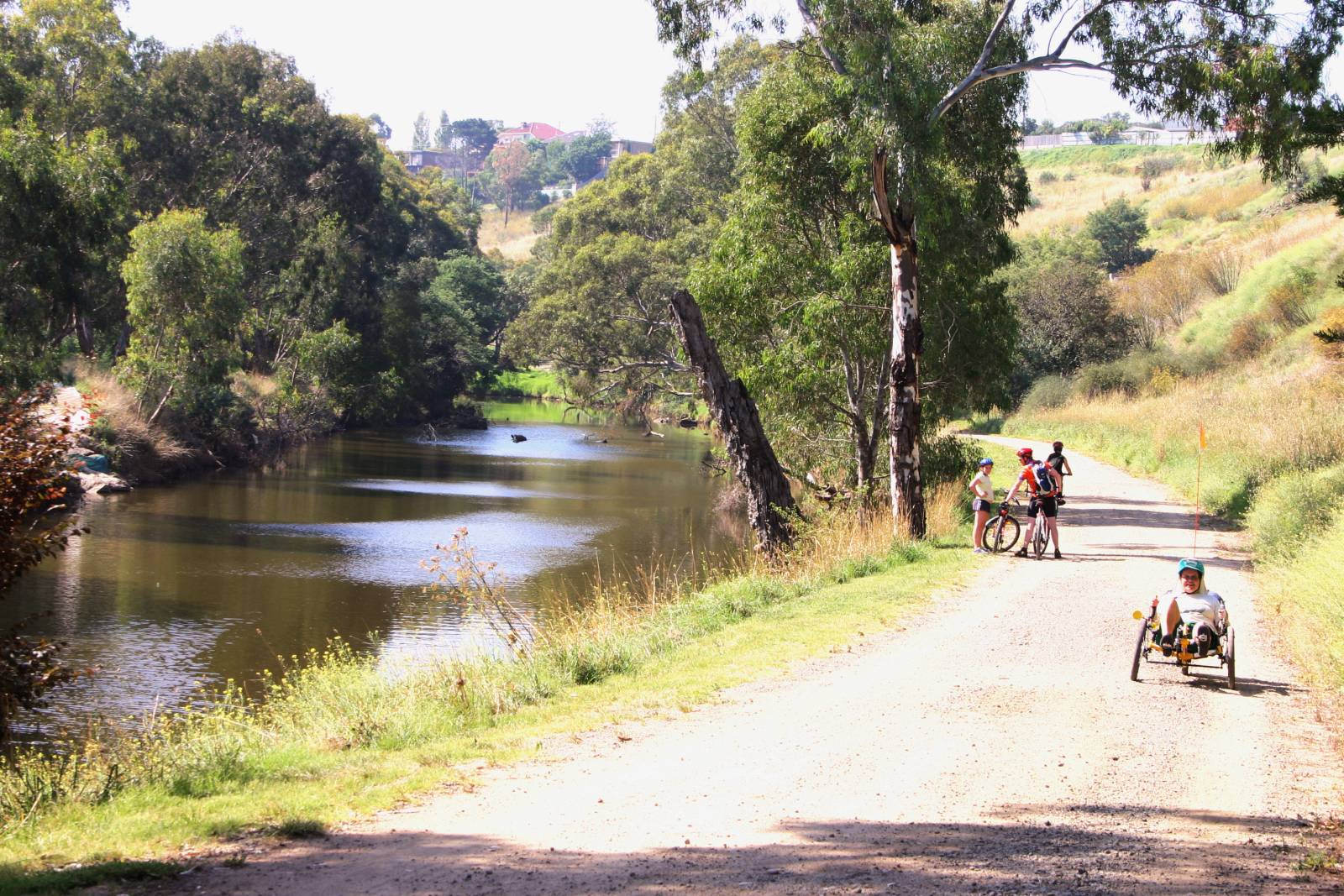
Cycling beside the Maribyrnong River at Avondale Heights

== Landmarks ==
Maribyrnong River, Brimbank Park, Horseshoe Bend Children's farm, Pipemakers Park, Canning Tea Gardens Reserve, Burndap Park, Thompson Street Reserve, 16m Mazu statue, Newells Paddock Wetlands Park.

== Connections ==
The Western Ring Road Trail connects with the Maribyrnong River Trail at the south end of Brimbank Park.

It connects to the Steele Creek Trail on the north side of Buckley Street. Use the Buckley Street underpass just west of Lily Street.

At Footscray, where Footscray Road crosses the Maribyrnong River over Shepherd Bridge, the trail splits in two. One path becomes the Hobsons Bay Coastal Trail. The other is a 2.8 km path, running along the south side of Footscray Road, which connects to the Capital City Trail.

On weekends, on the Hobsons Bay Coastal Trail, a punt takes cyclists across the Yarra River under the West Gate Bridge at Spotswood near the Scienceworks Museum.

A 3 km road section connects with Taylors Creek Trail in the north west. From the north end of Brimbank Park head north on Green Gully Road using the east side service road and then west on the Old Calder Highway using the service road on its south side. At the point where the Old Calder Highway and the Calder Freeway become close to each other, is a side street to the left (west), called Burrowye Crescent. The Taylors Creek Trail starts 500m down Burrowye Crescent on the right.

North end at 37.727171°S 144.835248°E. South end at 37.806250°S 144.906886°E.
