= St Joseph's Technical School, Abbotsford =

- Melbourne, Victoria; Australia

Information
- Type: Independent technical secondary school for boys
- Motto: Magnus Labor Praiemium Maius (Greater the effort, Greater the reward)
- Established: 1930
- Founder: Irish Christian Brothers
- Closed: 1990
- Campus: Abbotsford, Victoria
- Affiliation: Roman Catholic, Christian Brothers

St Joseph's Technical School, Abbotsford traces its beginnings to the opening of St. Joseph's Primary School on the same site in 1893 and was operated in the tradition of the Christian Brothers as a school for boys. In 1930 its function changed to that of a technical school. The school was formally closed in 1990.

== School history ==
=== 1892–1900 ===
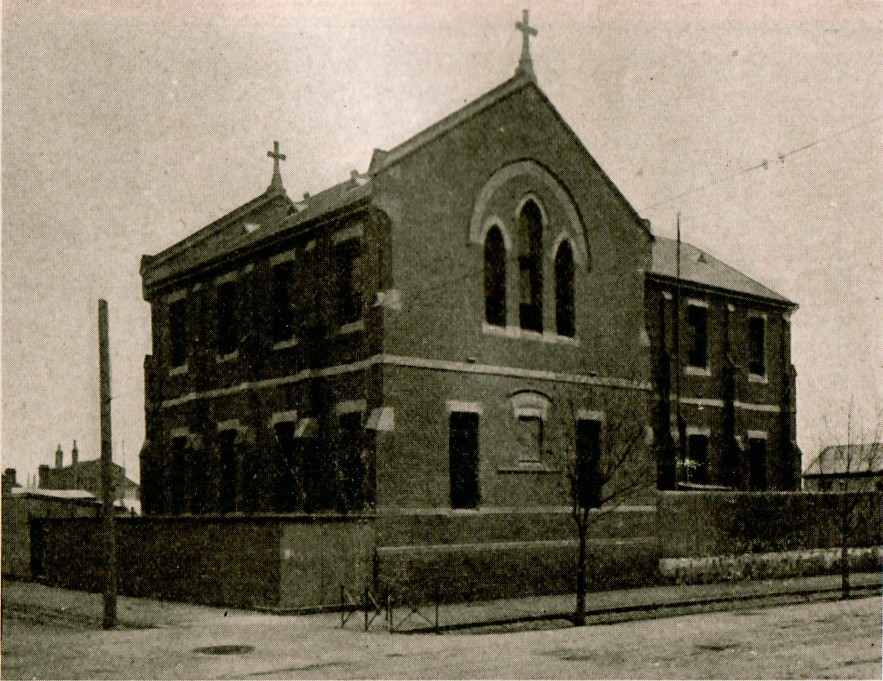
Original building constructed circa 1892.

From its early beginnings as a primary school for boys the site was operated by the Christian Brothers following a tradition of rigorous teaching of both secular and religious subjects. At the first annual prize distribution night in December 1893 the local parish priest, Peter Kernan, complimented the boys, the staff and the Brothers, represented by Br O'Hagan, on the fine progress they were making.

The education of girls in the local area was catered for by the Sisters of Charity, an order of nuns, who had opened St. Joseph's Primary School, Collingwood, just two years earlier. The nuns would remain in charge there from 1891 until 1993 when the first lay principal was engaged.

In its first year the boys school at Abbotsford operated from a two-story, slate roofed, brick building which included a small chapel. Primary school level classes, from Year one to Year five, which itself was divided into a 'Lower Fifth' and 'Higher Fifth', were offered. The school inspectors report for 1893 regarded St. Joseph's as a school which had attained first class 'Standard of Proficiency'.

=== 1900–1930 ===
By 1908 the school enrolment had risen to 450 pupils and the annual prize distribution night at the Collingwood Town Hall had become an annual event. Not only did this recognise those boys who had achieved high academic placings but it was also something of a spectacle encompassing gymnastics, singing, recitations and theatrical performance.

A strong Australian Army Cadet unit operated sporadically for various years beginning around 1908 when it formed two Companies, A and B, of the 12th Victorian Battalion. A Cadet band operated during the 1960s and the Cadets themselves remained at the school well into the 1970s.

The school enrolment remained relatively stable for some years and by 1918 it stood at 450 pupils.

=== 1930–1950 ===
In March 1930 the structure of the school changed and it was renamed St. Joseph's Technical College, Abbotsford. By the end of that year it had an enrolment in the technical division of 104 students taught by four Christian Brothers who had trade skills experience. It was to be the second Catholic technical school to be established in Melbourne following St. Joseph's, South Melbourne. Its establishment, supported by Archbishop Daniel Mannix, was designed to cater for the needs of Catholic youth from the north of the city who were seeking a trade. Between 1930 and 1937 approximately 1400 students had passed through the two schools. Around 500 boys had passed the Junior Technical Certificate examination, while an equal number had satisfied the needs for gaining an apprenticeship.

To meet increasing student needs a new wing was opened in 1941. Present at the opening were Archbishop Matthew Beovich, Harold Holt and senior officials of the State government. The building, costing £3000 and equipment £850, brought the total cost of expanding the facilities at the school to £6173. Given that the second world war was well underway this news was well accepted as a skills shortage in manufacturing was becoming evident.

=== 1950–1980 ===
The diamond jubilee of the founding of the school was celebrated in 1953. Representatives of the clergy, parents and members of the Abbotsfordonians' Old Boys association were present to share their memories of past school days. Many events were planned for that year and included visiting dignitaries such as Archbishop Matthew Beovich and past students and teachers.

=== 1980–2000 ===
Facing decreasing student numbers, and rising costs, the school was formally closed in 1990. Following its closure part of the site became home to the Sophia Mundi Steiner School which remained there until 2012. The site is currently used by a number of creative studios and also comprises 80 architect designed urban dwellings.

=== Dark days ===
Following the closure of the school a few members of the Christian Brothers from a variety of schools were called to answer abuse allegations. These allegations occurred prior to and during a formal Royal Commission into abuse within organisations operated by religious institutions. In 2014 St Joseph's in Abbotsford was named as one of the institutions in which abuse is alleged to have occurred or in which an abuser had worked.

Julian McDonald, in a newsletter published by the Christian Brothers, writes, "For us Christian Brothers, accepting the truth will mean acknowledging that a significant number of us have abused children in our care sexually, emotionally and physically. Abuse is, indeed, part of our sinful history." Members of the Congregation at a few schools caused much hurt; as McDonald says in way of explaining this, "... far too many [were] ill-equipped and ill-formed..."

Accounts from former residents of St Joseph's in the 1970s describe staff as inadequately trained and report incidents involving the Christian Brothers during that period.

== College crest ==
Based on the congregational crest of the Christian Brothers, both the primary school and technical school logos featured the school colours and motto.

== Sport ==
Sport was an important ingredient in the education of boys attending the school and included competing in events conducted by the Combined Brothers' Secondary Schools sports association. The school was well known locally for its Australian Rules Football team which was formed by 1907 and competed in the Christian Brothers' Competition against other schools. Another sport in which the school excelled was swimming.

== Associated schools ==
Over its long history the college was associated with a number of schools at one time or another. These included primary, or feeder schools, and higher secondary colleges.

== Alumni ==
=== General ===
- Maurice Buckley – Soldier of WW1, Victoria Cross and Distinguished Conduct Medal
- Ronald Cadee – Performer
- Ronald Conway – Author
- Stefan Haag OBE – Musician and director

=== Sport ===
- Charlie Cameron – Australian Rules Footballer (South Melbourne and Geelong clubs)
- Ted Cusack – Footballer (Richmond and North Melbourne clubs)
- Vin Doherty – Footballer (Collingwood, Hawthorn and Fitzroy clubs)
- Leo Maynes – Footballer (Fitzroy and Essendon clubs)
- Ray Martin – Footballer (Richmond club)
- Len Murphy – Footballer (Collingwood and Footscray clubs)
- Charlie Street – Footballer (Richmond and Carlton clubs)
- Billy Walsh – Footballer (Melbourne and Fitzroy clubs)
- Emmett Dunne – Richmond Premiership player 1980
- Adrian Marcon – Preston Football Club Premiership player (VFA)

== College principals ==
Period	Name
1893–1897	J J O’Connor
1898–1899	?
1900–1910	G L Blake
1911–1914	C L Whiting
1915–1917	?
1918–1922	F P O’Driscoll
1923–1924	M C Carey
1925–1926	C L Maloney
1927	J C Fanning
1928–1929	J J Bradley
1930–1939	A B Hanley
1940–1941	L B McKennariey
1942	R M McGrath
1943	V M Doran
1944–1947	G G Maguire
1948–1951	W K Butler
1952–1953	A F Webster
1954–1955	T J O’Farrell
1956	K P Kent
1957–1958	J B McDonogh
1959	D M Boulter
1960–1965	A F Webster
1966–1968	G T Barfield
1969–1971	J B Doudes
1972	P M Prendergast
1973	G R Donohue
1974–1975	F M Chappell
1976–1977	J B Hoye
1978–1983	D S Herrick
1984–1990	T J Parton

== See also ==
- List of schools in Victoria
- Education in Australia
- Congregation of Christian Brothers
