= Sophia Mundi Steiner School =

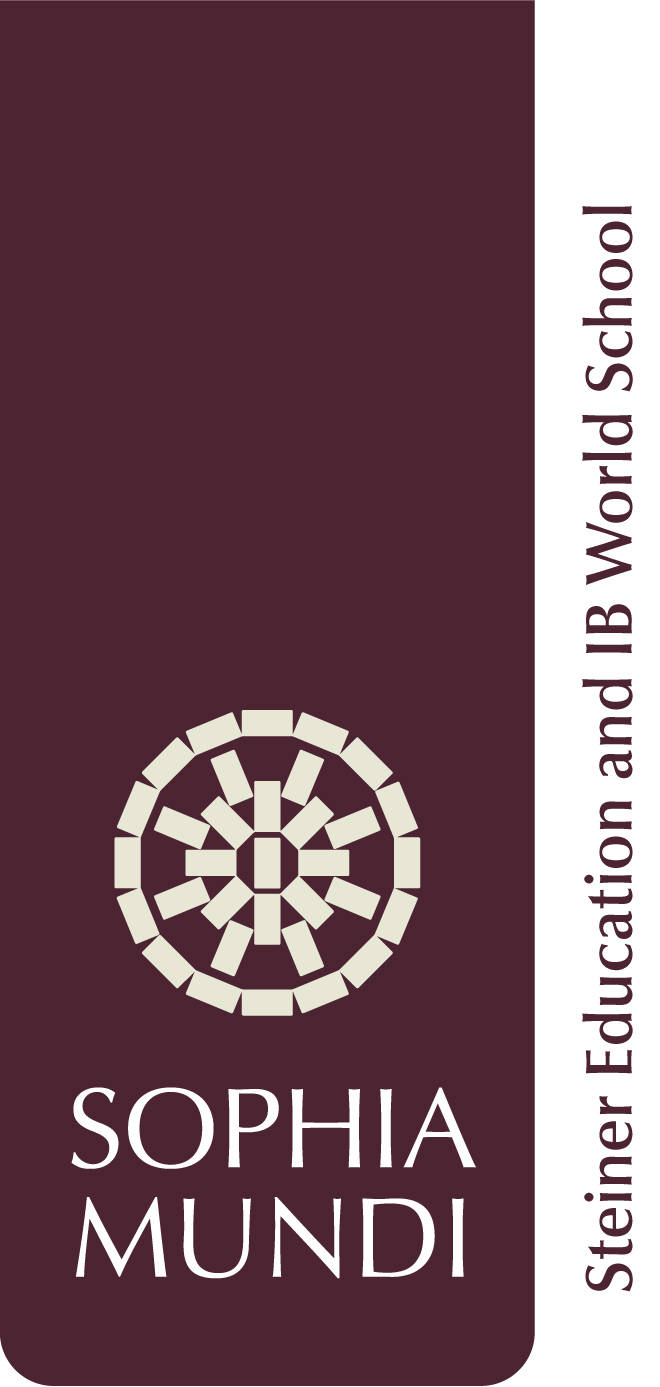

Location
- Abbotsford, Victoria; Australia; 37.803623°S 145.00505°E

Information
- Type: private, IB World school, co-educational
- Motto: Wisdom of the World
- Denomination: Steiner School
- Established: 1985
- Principal: Peter Henderson (Acting)
- Staff: 20 (full-time)
- Enrolment: ~200
- Website: www.sophiamundi.vic.edu.au

Sophia Mundi Steiner School is a private school located in Abbotsford, Victoria, Australia, that follows Rudolf Steiner's educational philosophy. Schools which follow Rudolf Steiner's theories are known as Steiner schools, or Waldorf schools. Sophia Mundi was founded in 1985 by a group of parents. Classes Prep to Year 12 are based in the St. Mary's building of the Abbotsford Convent complex. A Playgroup is also offered on site.

== Name ==
The name "Sophia Mundi" ("Wisdom of the World") is a combination of the Greek word "sophia" (wisdom) and the Latin word "mundus" (world).

== Facilities ==
The school is located in the Heritage listed St Marys building of the Abbotsford Convent artistic and historic precinct and overlooks a bend of the Yarra River and the Collingwood Children's Farm. The School site is located approximately 4 km from the Melbourne City Centre and is well served by public transport (Bus and Train) and is on the main Yarra Bike Path.

In December 2011, the School was granted approval to build four classrooms and to convert a disused swimming pool into a playground and meeting area. These improvements were to replace facilities lost in the sale of the old St Joseph's Technical School, Abbotsford site in Nicholoson Street, Abbotsford by the Catholic Diocese in Oct 2010. The old site had previously been used by the schools senior school classes. These classrooms, and the associated community meeting area and playground were opened in August 2012.

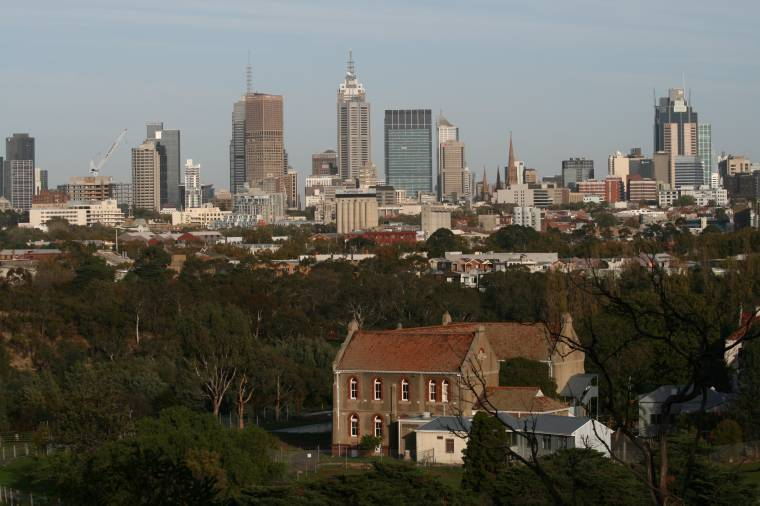

== Curriculum ==
Key subjects are taught in concentrated, progressive, three-week blocks (main lessons) so that the subject matter can be fully enjoyed, consolidated and digested. Drama, Art, Craft and Music are an integral part of the curriculum. Every child from Class Three onwards learns a musical instrument from the string family and participates in ensembles. The school supports the approach of Steiner Education Australia to create an ACARA endorsed Steiner curriculum for years 1–10 as an alternative to the Australian Curriculum, and plans to offer this curriculum now that it has been approved.

=== Senior School Curriculum up to 2010 ===
Up until 2010 the school offered a combined, ungraded VCE with a Steiner course for students in Years 11 and 12 which included a year-long research project of their choosing. The senior curriculum was changed due to reduced demand for this Steiner/Ungraded VCE combined offering and to recognise the desire from Students and parents for a more predictable tertiary pathway than a case by case negotiated pathway.

=== Senior School Curriculum from 2012 ===
The school was granted World School Status in October 2011 by the International Baccalaureate Organisation to offer the IB Diploma from 2012 for Years 11 and 12. The school became the third school to offer a combined Steiner and IB offering. The other two are Waldorfschoul Letzebuerg in Luxembourg and Colegio Internacional Rudolf Steiner in Ecuador. The first cohort of students graduated from the IB Diploma program in 2013. Following this the school also plans to offer a Vocational program as an alternative to the IB Diploma for senior students. This will be designed to provide a flexible learning framework tailored by the school to meet the individual needs of students, the local community and the world beyond.

== Notable alumni ==
- Jessica Hart (model)
- Ashley Hart (model)

== See also ==
- Curriculum of the Waldorf schools
- IB Diploma Programme
- Abbotsford Convent
