= Abbotsford Convent =

Former Roman Catholic convent in Abbotsford, Victoria, Australia

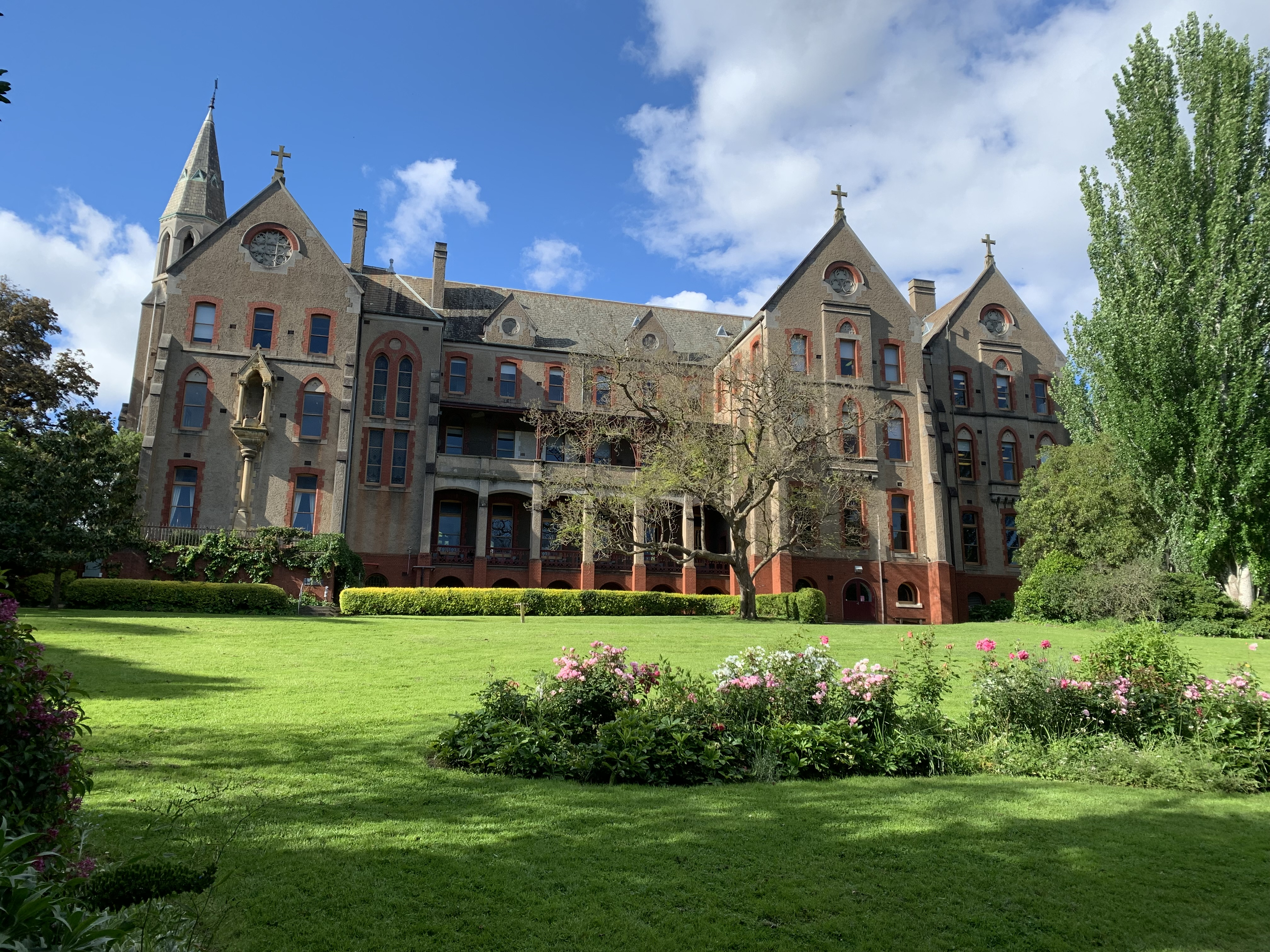
- The main building of the convent

- Location on the convent in Melbourne

Religion
- Affiliation: Roman Catholic
- Status: Convent
- Religious order: Sisters of the Good Shepherd

Location
- Location: Abbotsford, Melbourne, Victoria
- Country: Australia
- Interactive map of Abbotsford Convent
- Coordinates: 37°48′9″S 145°0′14″E

Architecture
- Architects: Thomas Kelly; William B. Tappin; Reed Smart and Tappin
- Type: Church / Convent
- Style: Gothic Revival
- Established: c. 1850s
- Site area: 14.5 ha (36 acres)
- Australian National Heritage List
- Type: Listed place (historic)
- Criteria: a, b
- Designated: 31 August 2017
- Reference no.: 106040
- Victorian Heritage Register
- Type: Registered place
- Criteria: A, C, D, E
- Designated: 20 August 1982
- Reference no.: H0951
- Heritage overlay no.: HO9
- Categories: Cemeteries and Burial Sites; Religion; Institutional Places

The Abbotsford Convent is located in Abbotsford, Victoria, an inner city suburb of Melbourne, Australia. The Convent is in a bend of the Yarra River west of Yarra Bend Park, with the Collingwood Children's Farm to its north and east, the river and parklands to its south and housing to its west.

During the 19th and part of the 20th century, the 6.8-hectare (17-acre) site was occupied by one of the largest convents in Victoria. For more than 100 years, the Abbotsford Convent provided shelter, food, education and work for tens of thousands of women and children who experienced poverty, neglect and social disadvantage.

Recognised as a place of outstanding historic value to Australia and the Commonwealth, because of the site's strong capacity to demonstrate the course and pattern of welfare provision in Australia, the convent was added to the Australian National Heritage List on 31 August 2017; and to the Victorian Heritage Register on 20 August 1982 in recognition of its historical, archaeological, architectural, and aesthetic significance to the State of Victoria.

Today the site and its buildings are used as an arts, educational and cultural hub, the grounds, historic buildings and gardens are occupied by and host artisans; community and cultural events and cultural institutions, a community classical music radio station (3MBS), a Steiner School (Sophia Mundi), live music performances, a gallery, theatre, markets, bakery, bar, cafe and a pay-as-you-feel restaurant.

There are 11 buildings on the site; the Convent, Convent Annexe, St Euphrasia, Providence, Rosina, St Mary's, Mercator, Magdalen Laundries, Sacred Heart, Industrial School and St Anne's.

== History ==
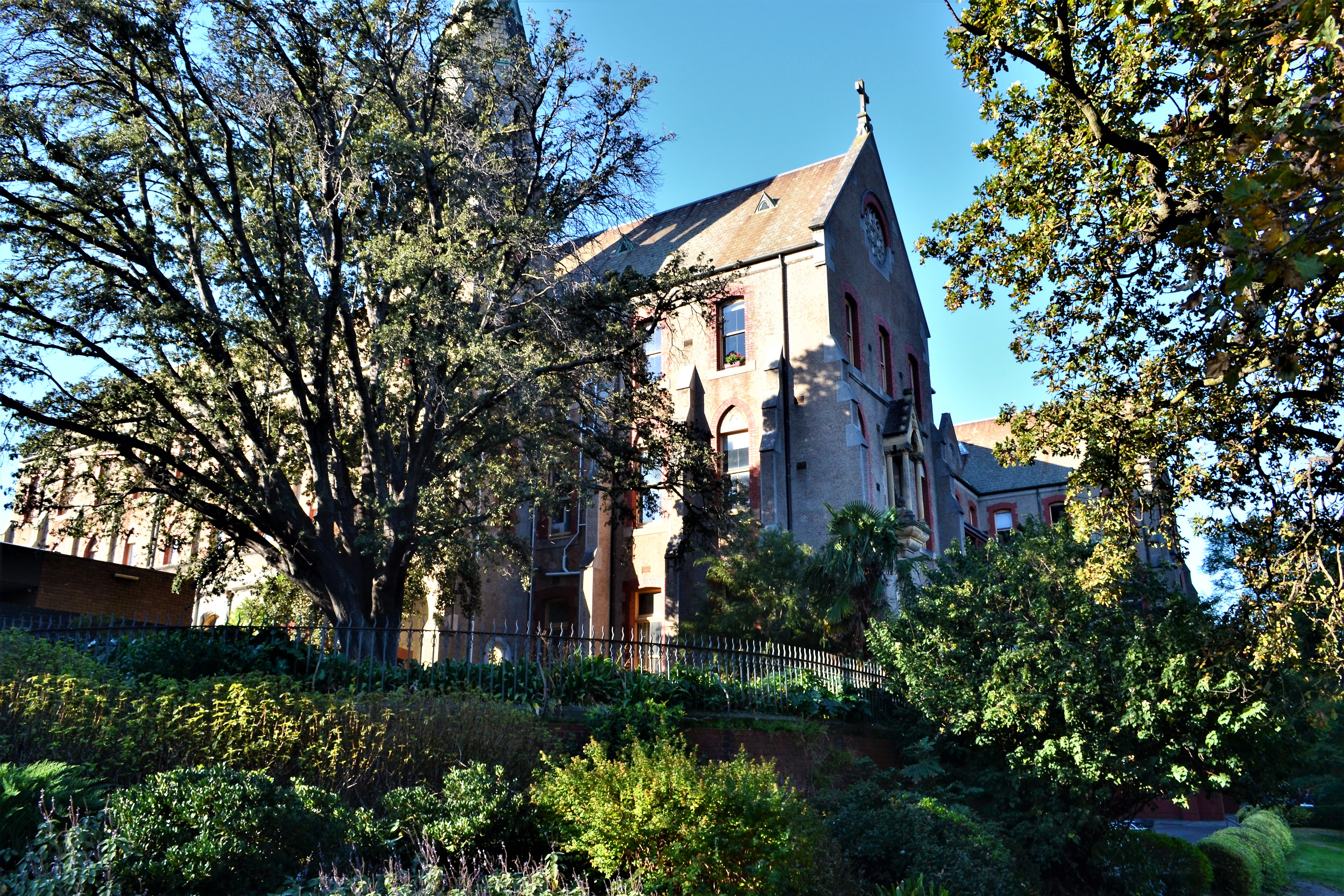
Abbotsford Convent at Abbotsford in Melbourne

=== Early history ===
The surrounding river valley was enjoyed for thousands of years by the traditional owners of the land, the Wurundjeri, for whom the nearby junction of the Yarra River and Merri Creek was an important meeting point.

The precinct surrounding the convent is the most intact site associated with the first documented European inland contact in Victoria. In 1803 Charles Grimes, Surveyor General of New South Wales, explored the Yarra by boat as far as Dights Falls. This bend of the river has been subject to less change than any other section of the river and the valley has changed little since early days of settlement.

Land at this bend of the river has been used for farming since the first formal land sales occurred in 1838, although anecdotal evidence indicates squatters were present before this date. The Abbotsford Precinct Heritage Farmlands, upon which the former convent is sited, are the oldest continually farmed lands in Victoria. The entire site is unique in that it is the only example of a working inner-city convent farm in a major city, anywhere in the world. The Collingwood Children's Farm (established in 1979) continues this farming tradition. Motivated by his passion for the Yarra, Charles La Trobe set aside land for parklands, now Yarra Bend Park, and for Government House (a concept abandoned in 1842), opposite what later became the Abbotsford Convent precinct.

Edward Curr lived on the site from 1842 to 1850 at his estate St Heliers. A news report of 1884 noted that restaurant owner and hotelier, Samuel Moss, 'made a fortune' in goldfields era Melbourne and 'sank some of it in building what is now the convent at Abbotsford'. In 1863, 'four Irish sisters from the Good Shepherd's mother house in Angers, France' bought the 'two large 1840s villa estates, St Heliers and Abbotsford House' to establish their Order.

=== Sisters of the Good Shepherd ===
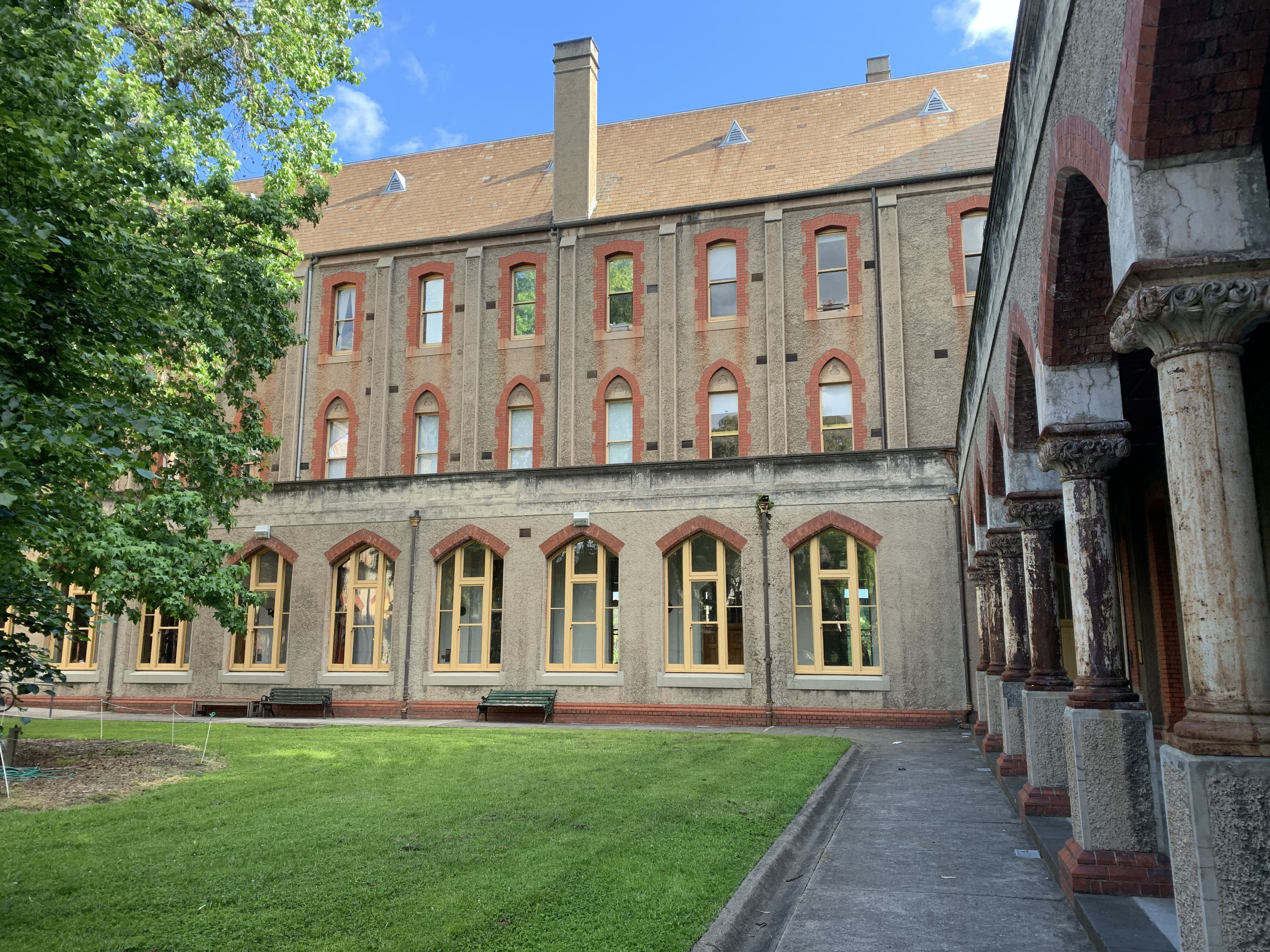
The main building of the convent and the courtyard it encloses

From 1863 to 1975 the Sisters of the Good Shepherd, an order of the Roman Catholic church, occupied the site. For a century from the 1860s onwards, the Sisters of the Good Shepherd provided accommodation, schooling and work for female orphans, Wards of the State and girls considered by the State and/or the Church to be in moral danger. There also existed a smaller number of older residents whose ages ranged from young adult to the elderly. These elderly residents, some of whom had been at the convent since childhood, were housed in a separate dormitory. There were vegetable and fruit gardens, dairy and poultry farms and a piggery. Income to buy what could not be grown or made on-site was generated through lace-making and commercial laundry services. The Convent was able to house up to 1,000 residents and was largely self-sufficient through its farming, Industrial School and laundry activities. As with many such institutions of its era, conditions for the girls was often austere. The large buildings were largely unheated and girls were pressed into laundry and other activities that involved long hours and no pay. Children housed at the convent, as recently as the 1960s, have reported that the daily operation of the convent was draconian.

The earliest industrial developments in Melbourne were along the banks of the Yarra River and Abbotsford, Collingwood and Richmond became some of the most important industrial regions in Australia until World War II. The area suffered major social problems as a result of poverty and poor housing, particularly during the depressions of the 1890s and 1930s. The Convent was a significant architectural and cultural landmark for a local community that had included a high proportion of Catholic working class.

Today, the former Convent of the Good Shepherd is historically recognised as the most important Catholic institutional complex constructed in Victoria. Since the turn of the 21st century, the site has become a community art and cultural hub, hosting various cultural institutions across art, music, food, community gatherings, textiles and other disciplines.

=== Notable Students and Residents ===
- Mollie Dyer

== Buildings and architecture ==
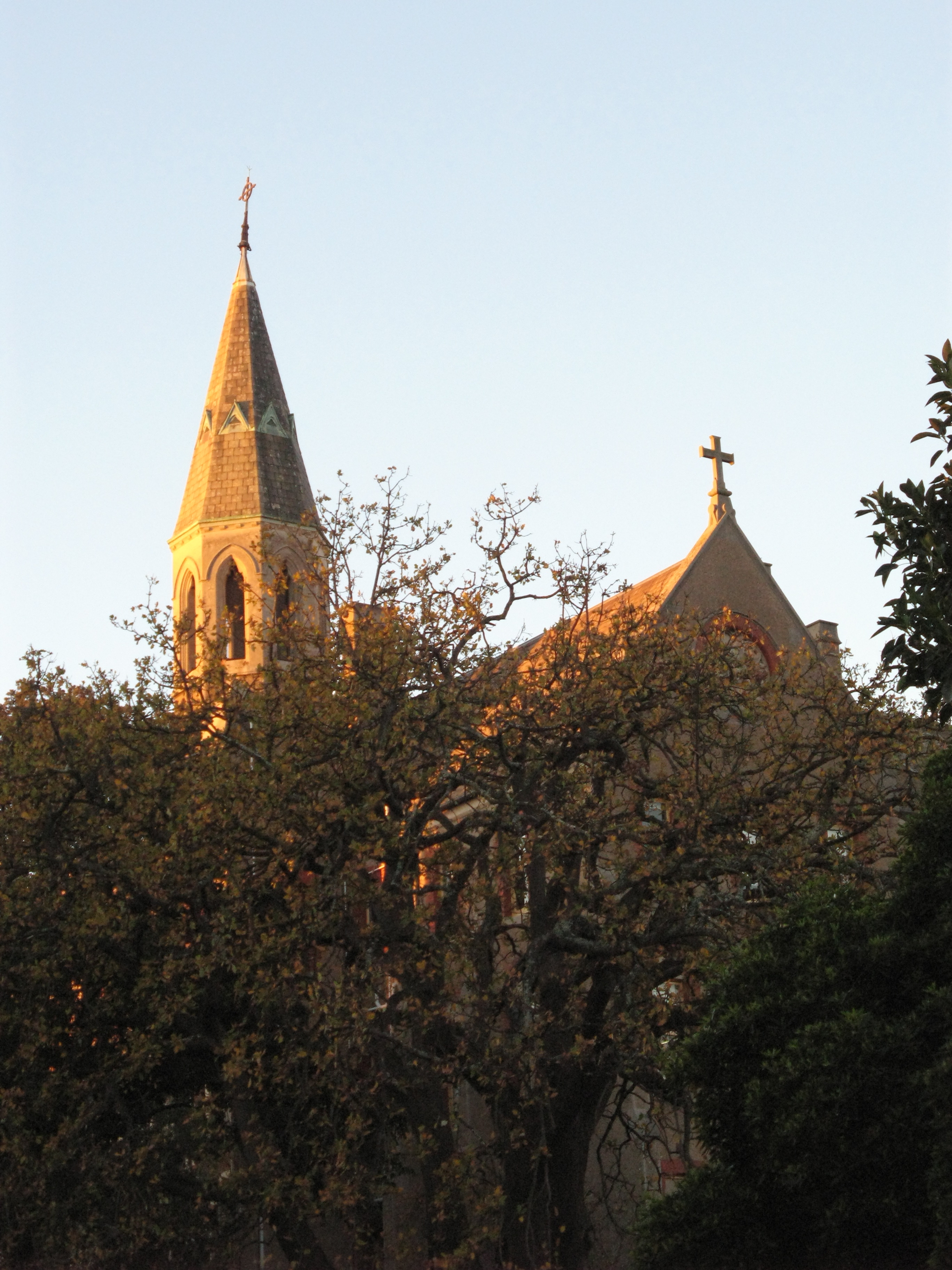
A tower on the main building

The former Convent of the Good Shepherd, the most important Catholic institutional complex constructed in Victoria, is notable for its scale and extent, the architectural qualities of the buildings and its range of building types. Some outstanding features are the medieval French ecclesiastic architectural character, the historical importance of the Industrial School and the Magdalen Asylum, the scale and grandeur of the main convent building and formal gardens, the survival of many of these elements and the aesthetic qualities of the surrounding farmland and rural setting.

- Industrial School
- Kitchen Annex (1902) – prepared food for up to 1,000 people, the largest kitchen in Victoria in 1902.
- Magdalen Laundries
- Mercator (1880s–1960s) – built in stages, initially laundry facilities
  - Held a glass blowing studio until January 2011, now a 'hard arts' facility for Sophia Mundi Steiner School
- Providence (1887) – formerly a finishing school and dormitories
  - Currently houses the Convent Foundation's office and the Wurundjeri Tribe Land Compensation and Cultural Heritage Council.
- Rosina (1908) – formerly dormitories, refectory and performance spaces, currently used as performance spaces
- Sacred Heart (1877) – formerly dormitories and refectory, no current use
- St. Anne's
- St. Euphrasia (1879) – initially a school
  - Currently occupied by the classical community radio station, 3MBS.
- St Mary's (1911) – formerly boarding
  - Currently houses the Sophia Mundi Steiner School
- The Convent (1900–1903) – initially housed the sisters’ cells, meeting/community rooms, refectory and library spaces.
  - Currently houses office spaces, artist studios, meeting, function, exhibition spaces and retail food spaces.
- Australian National Academy of Music

== Events ==
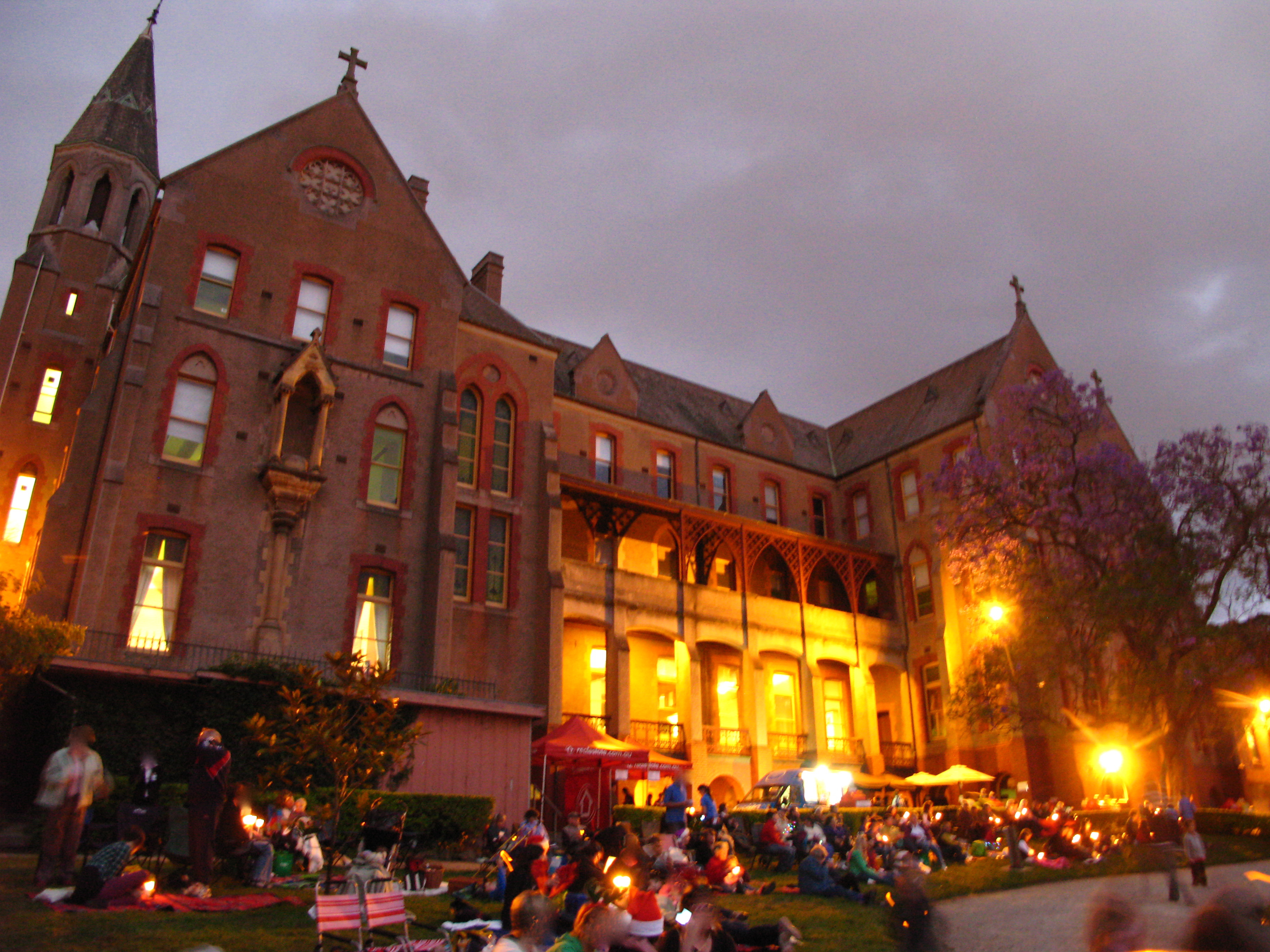
Carols at the Convent, 2009

=== Music ===
- Shadow Electric Band Room (Regular live music performances)
- Beg, Scream & Shout
- Push Over, all-ages music event (March 2010)
- Lentil as Anything (regular impromptu musical performances)
- Carols at The Convent (2005–2008)

=== Markets ===
- Supper Market (Every Friday evening in Summer)
- Shirt & Skirt Market (Third Sunday of every month, 10am – 4pm)
- Makers' Market (Third Sunday of every month, 10am – 4pm)
- Slow Food Farmers' Market (Fourth Saturday of every month, 8am – 1pm)

=== Festivals ===
- Found Festival (May 2014)
- Persian Fair
- Fringe Furniture
- Globelight
- One Fine Day Wedding Fair
- Writers at the Convent literary festival (February)
- Crime & Justice literary festival (July)
- Open Source Developers' Conference Australia, 2010

=== Film ===
- The Shadow Electric Open Air Cinema (Open in Summer)

== See also ==
- Magdalene asylum
