= Jessica Hart (model) =

Australian model (born 1986)

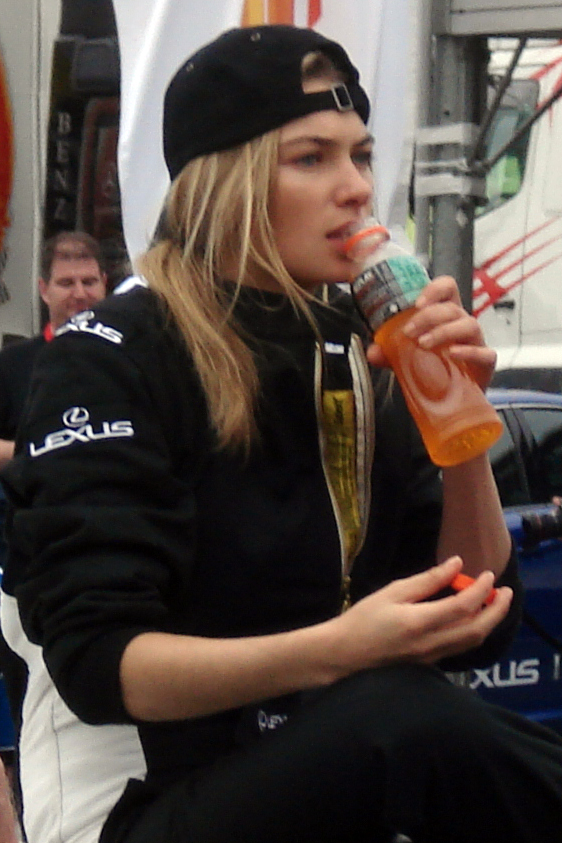
- Hart at the 2011 Australian Grand Prix
- Born: Jessica Rae Hart; 26 March 1986 (age 40); Sydney, New South Wales, Australia
- Partners: Stavros Niarchos III (2010-c. 2017); James Kirkham (2018-present)
- Children: 2
- Relatives: Ashley Hart (sister)
- Modelling information
- Height: 1.76 m (5 ft 9 1/2 in)
- Hair colour: Blonde (naturally dark brown)
- Eye colour: Blue-green
- Agency: The Lions (New York, Los Angeles); Oui Management (Paris); Monster Management (Milan); Select Model Management (London); Traffic Models (Barcelona); UNIQUE DENMARK (Copenhagen); Chadwick Models (Sydney) (mother agency)

Jessica Rae Hart (born 26 March 1986) is an Australian model and founder of LUMABeauty. She was discovered in Melbourne and has appeared on the cover of Australian Vogue.

== Early life and discovery ==
Hart was born in Sydney, Australia and attended Sophia Mundi Steiner School in Abbotsford, Victoria until she was noticed at the age of 15 at a local shopping centre. Another story of her rise to fame has her encouraged by an aunt to enter a modeling competition hosted by Dolly Magazine in 2000. She won the competition with her mother, Rae, and sister, Ashley, as witnesses at Crown Casino. She is known for a gap-tooth smile. Her sister, Ashley Hart, is also a model.

== Career ==
Hart moved to New York City to pursue a career in modeling and has appeared in campaigns for Guess, Triumph, and Esprit. Hart shot her Swimsuit Issue photos in Mexico in November 2008.

In 2008, she considered a role in an Entourage-like drama alongside Alyssa Sutherland. In May 2009, Australian media reported that Hart had signed on to appear in advertising for Victoria's Secret. With Heidi Klum, Karolina Kurkova and Adriana Lima all pregnant in the fall of 2009, Hart appeared extensively in the season's Victoria's Secret catalogs. Hart appeared in the 2009 Sports Illustrated Swimsuit Issue.

Hart was also in a few episodes of MTV's The City during its first season, in which she is shown dating Tamarama band member Nicolas Potts, her long-term boyfriend. She has participated in Tamarama music videos, such as "Everything To Me" (alongside fellow Australian model Miranda Kerr) and "Middle of a Magazine".

In 2010, Hart walked in the Spring/Summer 2011 shows for Gottex Swimwear, PPQ, Louise Gray, Emilio de la Moreno, Osman, Sass & bide, Julien MacDonald, Matthew Williamson, Antonio Berardi, Christopher Kane, David Koma, Giles Deacon, Charlie Le Mindu and Jon. In 2012 she became the face of the new Scotch And Soda line Été Blanc for Maison Scotch.

In early 2012, Jessica had a couple of minor accidents - breaking her ankle and then in a separate incident, cutting her foot on glass at a wedding, which led to nerve damage in her foot. This led to Jessica being on hiatus few months.

Hart walked the runway in the annual Victoria's Secret Fashion Show in 2012 and 2013. In March 2013, Hart walked for Louis Vuitton at Paris Fashion Week and in September, for Dolce and Gabbana and Max Mara at Milan Fashion Week.

In January 2014, Hart once again appeared on the cover of Australian Vogue. In February and March, Hart walked for designers including Sonia Rykiel and Rag & Bone at Fall/Winter New York Fashion Week and Paris Fashion Week, appeared on the covers of British GQ and French L'Officiel, the former alongside Chris O'Dowd. Hart also shot campaigns for Victoria's Secret Body and Andrew Marc and walked for Marc Jacobs at Spring/Summer New York Fashion Week. In October, Hart was featured on the cover of Australian Cosmopolitan and in November, the Greek edition. Hart has also appeared on the cover of Harper's Bazaar (Australia, Mexico, Greece, Czech Republic), Marie Claire Italia, Elle (Italy, Spain, Australia, Argentina, Serbia), L'Officiel (Paris, Switzerland, Singapore, Turkey, Australia). Hart has also shot editorials for American Vogue, Love and V.

Hart founded beauty brand LUMA Beauty, a line of naturally-sourced skincare & makeup products, in 2014.

In 2015, Hart was shot alongside Gigi Hadid by Bruce Weber for American Vogue. She then walked for Vionnet at Paris Fashion Week.

== Personal life ==
Hart and her then-boyfriend, Tamarama band member and fellow Australian Nicolas Potts, purchased a $1-million one-bedroom property in Manhattan's Battery Park during the summer of 2008. Hart was in a relationship with Greek shipping heir Stavros Niarchos III (grandson of Stavros Niarchos) from 2011-2017.

Hart has been in a relationship with race car driver James Kirkham since 2019. They became engaged during her baby shower in 2020. The couple welcomed their first child together, a daughter named Baby-Rae, on 17 November 2020. Hart will be step-mother to Kirkham's daughter from a previous relationship. Hart gave birth to a boy named Glorious, on 2 February 2022.

In August 2021, Hart's Los Angeles home was featured in Architectural Digest, while her Gramercy Park apartment was featured in 2017.
