= Ashley Hart (model) =

Australian model (born 1988)

- Born: 9 August 1988 (age 38)
- Occupation: Model
- Spouse(s): Marco Utah (m. 2026) Buck Palmer (m. 2015–2017)
- Relatives: Jessica Hart (sister)

Ashley Hart (born 9 August 1988) is an Australian Model and Yogi.

== Early life and career ==
Hart grew up in Melbourne, Australia and attended Sophia Mundi Steiner School with her sister Jessica Hart. She describes her mother Rae, as a hippie eurythmist who worked hard as a single mother to put her and her sister through school and instill a spiritual connection in her life. In an interview with Australia's 60 Minutes, it was revealed that Rae waited until she was pregnant with Ashley to leave the difficult relationship with the girls' father, knowing that the two sisters would always have each other.

Hart started modelling at the age of 15 after following in the footsteps of her older sister Jessica Hart and stated that "I got into it because I saw how much money Jess was making".

At the age of 17, Hart moved to Germany to continue her modelling career. In the years that followed, Hart lived in between New York and Los Angeles.

Hart was the face of Coles fashion label Mix in 2013 and was the ambassador for Melbourne Spring Fashion Week in 2014.

In 2014, Hart was part of Australia's Dancing With The Stars with dance partner Julz Tocker, but was eliminated in the first round.

Wellness and fitness is a big part of Hart's life, and she is trained in Thai massage, is a yoga instructor (Ashtanga based Vinyasa flow) and regularly practices meditation. She is training to be a certified health coach.

Her athletic nature and physique led her to the path of a fitness model. About her body she stated; "When I was younger, I was always wanting to be skinnier. I was always the sporty one and Jess was always legs 11. I looked at the coat-hanger runway models and I thought, 'I'm not that.' I had moments of not accepting that, but now I love that I'm athletic and muscly. Through modelling I've grown into a deeper acceptance and love of myself. It's been a really nice way to get to know who I am at a deeper level and allow that part of me to shine."

Focusing on her wellness interests, Hart is the ambassador for Australian vitamin and wellness group, Swisse.

== Personal life ==
Hart married her long-term boyfriend, Buck Palmer in Los Angeles in 2015 and divorced in 2017. Hart went on to date Brett Leve in 2019. In August 2020, Hart confirmed a relationship with Marco Utah.

Hart currently resides in Austin, Texas.
