= Billy Walsh (Australian footballer) =

Australian rules footballer (1911–1986)

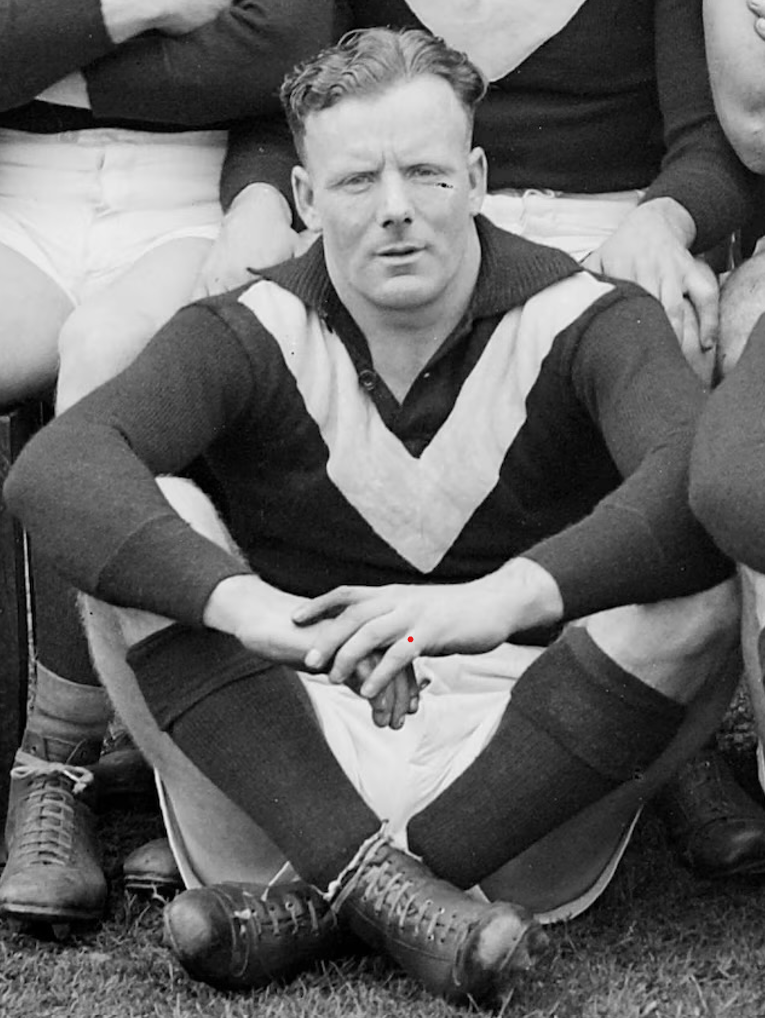
- Walsh playing for RAAF in 1942

Personal information
- Full name: William Joseph Walsh
- Born: 18 February 1911; Collingwood, Victoria
- Died: 11 September 1986 (aged 75); Heidelberg Repatriation Hospital, Heidelberg, Victoria
- Original team: Preston (VFA)
- Height: 177 cm (5 ft 10 in)
- Weight: 71 kg (157 lb)

Playing career^{1}
Years	Club	Games (Goals)
1932-33	Preston (VFA)	23 (39)
1934	Melbourne (VFL)	3 (2)
1935-37	Preston (VFA)	23 (24)
1944	Fitzroy (VFL)	1 (0)
1945	Preston (VFA)	7 (7)
Total		57 (72)
- ^{1} Playing statistics correct to the end of 1945.

Career highlights
- Member of Melbourne Seconds premiership team: 1934; Best on ground in the 1934 VFL Seconds Grand Final; Royal Australian Air Force representative footballer: 1942-1945; Clota Medal: 1946

William Joseph Walsh (18 February 1911 – 11 September 1986) was an Australian rules footballer who played with the Preston Football Club in the Victorian Football Association (VFA), and with the Melbourne Football Club and Fitzroy Football Club in the Victorian Football League (VFL).

== Family ==
The son of John Walsh (1874-1952), and Catherine Walsh (1876-1949), née Cleary, William Joseph Walsh was born at Collingwood, Victoria on 18 February 1911.

He married Roma Rubina Ward (1914–1992) in 1936 and together they had one daughter, Judith Veronica Mary Walsh (1937-2014).

== Education ==
He was educated at St Joseph's Technical School, Abbotsford.

== Football ==
After finishing school, Walsh stepped away from football for approximately five years before resuming the game with Richmond United. His performances there led to his recruitment by Preston in the Victorian Football Association, where he played across 1932 and 1933.

In early 1934, Walsh joined Melbourne, playing primarily with the club’s Seconds. He was selected for the final three senior VFL matches of the 1934 season and was best on ground in Melbourne’s victory in the 1934 VFL Seconds Grand Final. He returned to Preston following the season.

In his first match back at Preston in 1935, Walsh suffered a season-ending broken leg. He later trained with Footscray during the 1936 pre-season, before resuming playing duties with Preston. He subsequently played with General Motors–Holden in the Saturday Morning Football League during the 1938 and 1939 seasons, before moving to Moe in 1940, where he was appointed captain-coach.

Walsh served in the Royal Australian Air Force during World War II, remaining in Australia throughout the conflict. During his service, he continued to play football when permitted and represented RAAF teams, including in 1942.

In 1944, Walsh returned briefly to the Victorian Football League, playing one senior match for Fitzroy at the age of 33, before returning to Preston in 1945.

=== Preston (VFA) ===
He made his debut for Preston in the match against Yarraville, at the Yarraville Oval, on 14 May 1932, and went on to play in 23 games (39 goals) in 1932 and 1933.

=== Melbourne (VFL) ===
Cleared to Melbourne from Preston on 4 May 1934, he played for most of the season with the Melbourne Seconds. He played in the last three home-and-away matches of the 1934 season for the Firsts, was best on the ground for the team that won the 1934 VFL Seconds Grand Final, was released before the 1935 season began, and cleared back to Preston.

=== Preston (VFA) ===
He played in 23 games for Preston from 1935 to 1937. In his first match back at Preston, playing against Oakleigh, at the Oakleigh Football Ground, on 11 May 1935, Walsh broke his leg and did not play again that season.

=== General Motors-Holden (SMFL) ===
In 1938 he was cleared from Preston to play with General Motors-Holdens in the Saturday Morning Football League. He played with the team for the entire 1938 and 1939 seasons, including the 1938 Grand Final winning team, and the 1939 Grand Final losing team.

=== Moe (CGFA) ===
On 17 April 1940 he was cleared from Preston to the Moe Football Club, where he had been appointed captain-coach. Walsh, the captain-coach of Moe, did not play in the match between Moe and Leongatha on 29 June 1940; with the local paper reporting that he had returned to his former team, "Preston Seconds".

=== RAAF ===
While enlisted, Walsh continued to play football when possible and represented RAAF teams, including documented matches in 1942. Contemporary publications confirm that service football continued alongside military duties.

=== Fitzroy (VFL) ===
He was cleared from Moe to Fitzroy on 5 May 1944, and played his only senior game for Fitzroy against St Kilda, at the Brunswick Street Oval, on 6 May 1944.

=== Preston (VFA) ===
Cleared from Fitzroy to Preston on 27 April 1945, he played in 7 games (7 goals) in 1945.

=== Post-War Football ===
Following the conclusion of World War II, Walsh remained involved in football at association and local levels. In 1946, he played and coached at Kew in the VFL Sub-District competition, where he won the Clota Medal as the league’s best and fairest player. He then moved to Holbrook in 1947, where he continued his football career in country competition, playing and leading the club in the post-war period.

== Military service ==
Walsh served in the Royal Australian Air Force (from 15 January 1942 to 30 November 1945) during World War II. He did not serve overseas.

== Death ==
He died at the Heidelberg Repatriation Hospital, in Heidelberg, Victoria, on 11 September 1986.
