= Collingwood Children's Farm =

City farm in Melbourne, Australia

Coordinates: 37°48′10″S 145°0′19″E

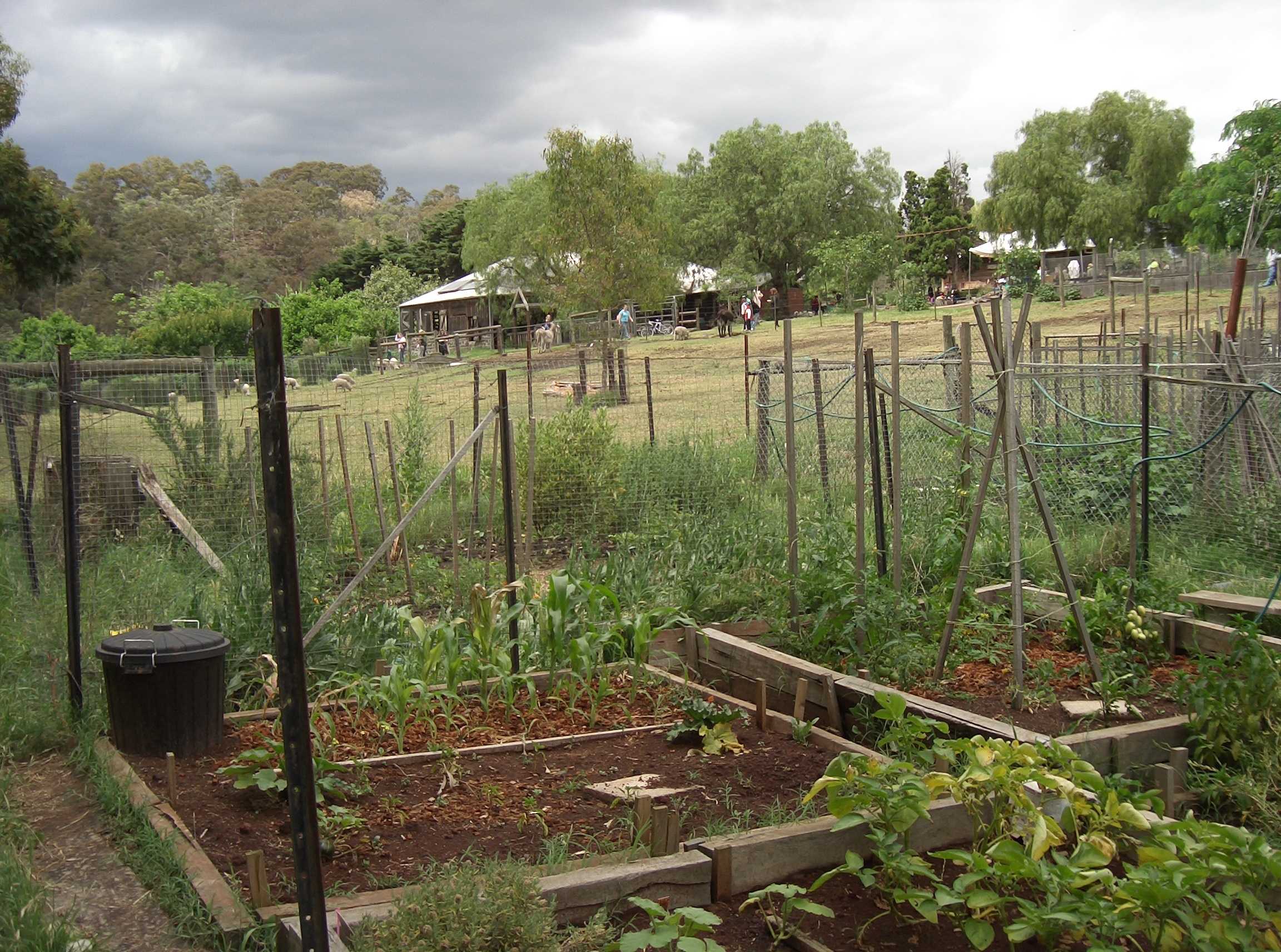
Vegetable plots and in the background, sheep.

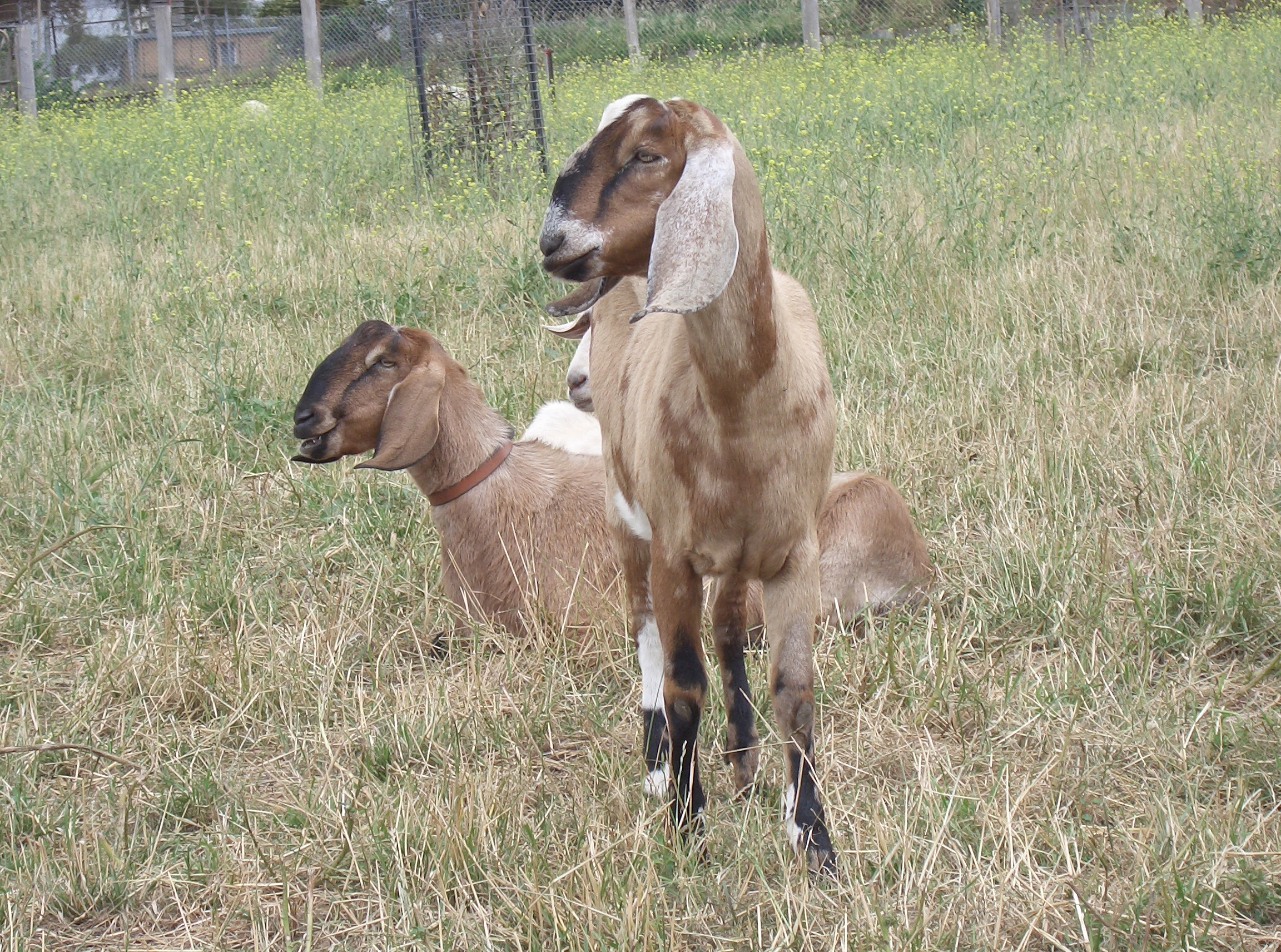
Nubian goats are kept at the Farm.

Collingwood Children's Farm is a not-for-profit, inner city working farm situated on the Yarra River in the Melbourne suburb of Abbotsford, Australia. It is located on Wurundjeri Woiwurrung country. It is adjacent to the Abbotsford Convent, and considered part of the larger Abbotsford Heritage Precinct Farmlands (APHF).

== Establishment ==
Farming on the site of the Children's Farm has continued uninterrupted from its agricultural use by Wurundjeri Woiwurrung people to grow crops such as Murnong (Microseris lanceolata). European farming commenced in early 1836, with formal land sales occurring in 1838.

In 1974, the Victorian Government purchased part of the land from the Sisters of the Good Shepherd, who had established a convent and women's refuge, along with continuing farming. The Farm began in 1979 after a community committee leased a small area to establish a Children's Farm. It's said that a Collingwood Council social worker initiated the Farm by proposing a green space for children living in the adjacent housing estates. The aim of the Farm was to educate children about farming and food production using sustainable practices.

In 1997, most of the surrounding land was sold to private developers, but local residents and the Abbotsford Convent Coalition managed to save the convent and associated areas for redevelopment.

It is also the oldest children's farm in Australia.

== Organisation and activities ==
The Collingwood Children's Farm is a not-for-profit organisation. The Farm was originally managed by the Collingwood Council and transitioned to being governed by a Committee of Management in the 1990s.

The Farm has received support from State and Local governments since the 1980s, but most operational costs are funded by entry fees and donations. The farm relies on community efforts with staff, volunteers and a young farmers' program working to maintain the farm.

The Farm is open 7 days a week. Activities and attractions include:

- A range of animals including cows, goats, sheep, horses, ducks, pigs, chickens, geese, peacocks and guinea pigs. Most of the animals at the farm are classified as rare breeds.
- A café, which also manages events and weddings at the Farm.
- Community programs focusing on horticulture, animal husbandry, and land care, offered at low to no cost.
- Volunteer programs. The Farm had run programs as part of the National Disability Insurance Scheme (NDIS) but they were paused in mid-2024.
- School tours and holiday programs.
- Community gardens, which are being redeveloped after a report in 2021 assessed the area was unsafe. As of 22 November 2024, plans for the area had been approved but construction had not begun.
- An annual bonfire event to celebrate the Winter Solstice.

The Yarra River Trail passes through the Farm.

== See also ==
- CERES Community Environment Park
