= Abbotsford, Victoria =

Abbotsford
- Suburb
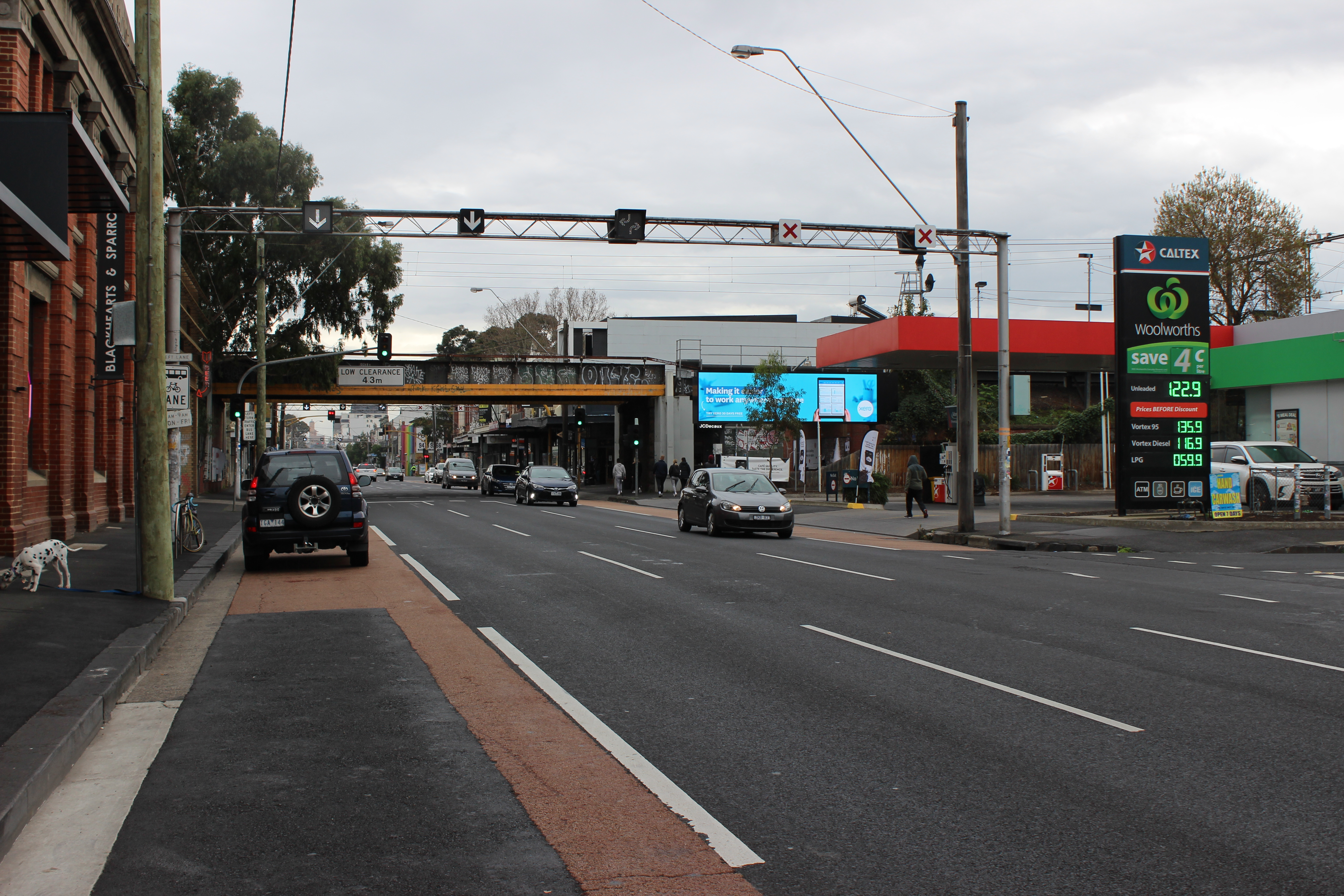
- Johnston Street, Abbotsford

- Interactive map of Abbotsford
- Coordinates: 37.803°S 145.002°E
- Country: Australia
- State: Victoria
- City: Melbourne
- LGA: City of Yarra
- Location: 2 km (1.2 mi) from Melbourne
- Established: 1870s

Government
  - State electorate: Richmond
  - Federal division: Melbourne

Area
  - Total: 1.8 km^{2} (0.69 sq mi)

Population
  - Total: 9,088 (2021 census)
  - Density: 5,050/km^{2} (13,100/sq mi)
- Postcode: 3067
Suburbs around Abbotsford
Clifton Hill	Clifton Hill	Fairfield
Collingwood	Abbotsford	Kew
East Melbourne	Richmond	Hawthorn

Abbotsford (Woiwurrung: Carran-carramulk) is an inner-city suburb in Melbourne, Victoria, Australia, 2 km (1.2 mi) north-east of Melbourne's Central Business District, located within the City of Yarra local government area. Abbotsford recorded a population of 9,088 at the 2021 census.

Abbotsford is bounded by Collingwood, Richmond and Clifton Hill and separated from Kew by the meandering Yarra River. Formerly part of the City of Collingwood, it is now part of the City of Yarra. Victoria Street forms the southern boundary to Abbotsford (with Richmond); Hoddle Street forms the western boundary (with Collingwood); the Eastern Freeway forms the northern boundary (with Clifton Hill) while the Yarra forms the eastern boundary with Kew, in Boroondara.

Some well-known Abbotsford landmarks include the Skipping Girl Sign, Dights Falls, the former Collingwood Town Hall, Victoria Park Football Stadium and Abbotsford Convent.

Abbotsford is designated one of the 82 Major Activity centres listed in the Metropolitan Strategy Melbourne 2030.

Abbotsford takes its name from the estate of John Orr, which in turn is named after a ford in Scotland's Tweed River, used by the abbot of Melrose Abbey. Since World War II the area has become quite ethnically diverse.

== History ==
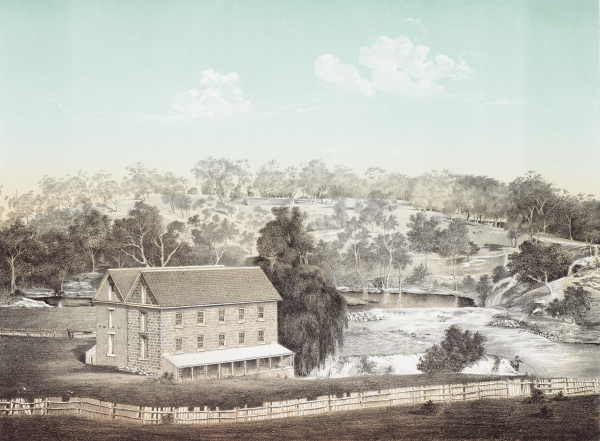
Dights Mill (built 1839) pictured in 1863

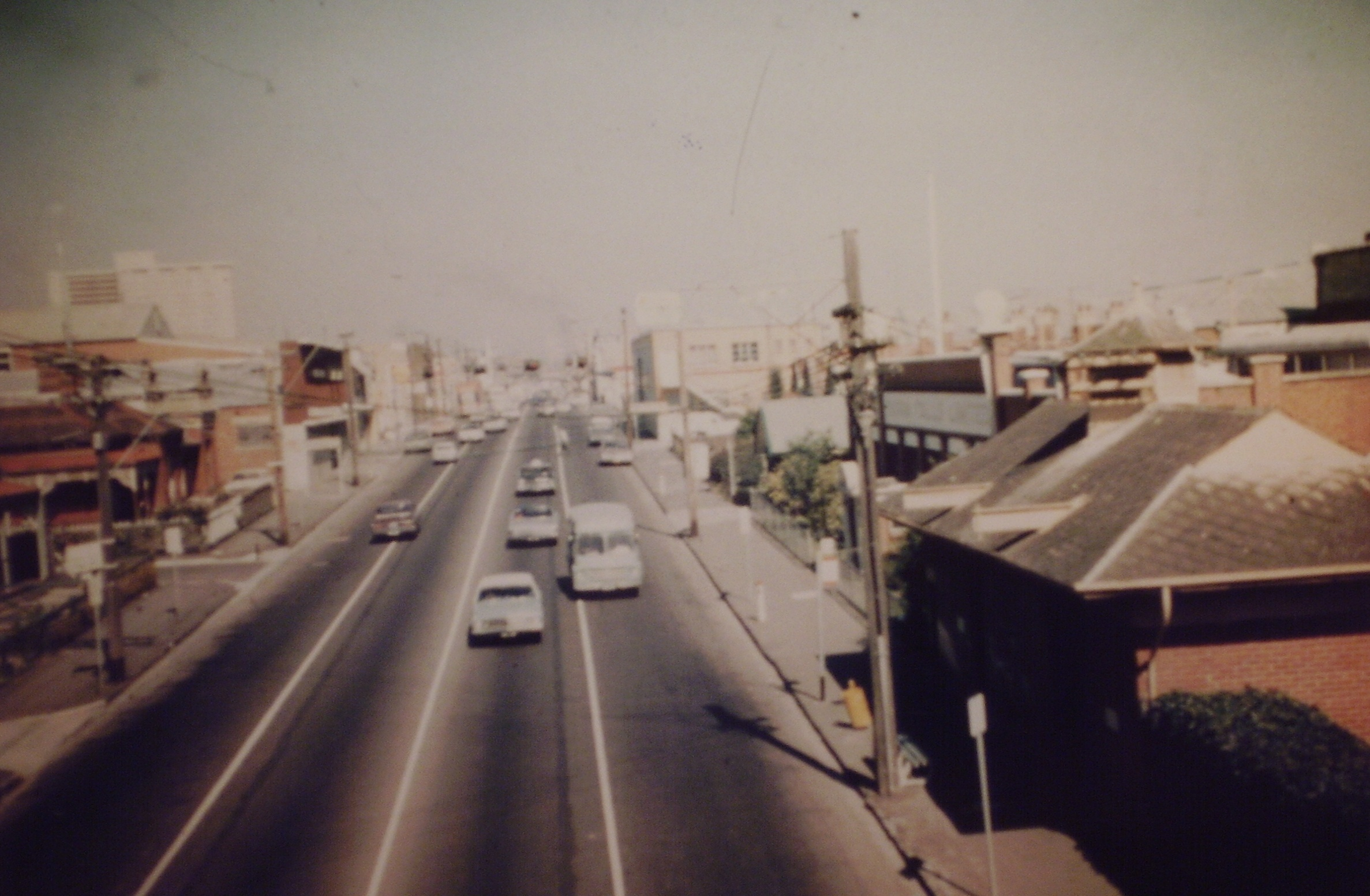
Johnston Street in 1972

The Abbotsford area was once bush along the Yarra River occupied by the Wurundjeri people. In the Woiwurrung language the area is named Carran-carramulk, with 'carran' meaning prickly myrtle.

The area of Abbotsford was first subdivided in 1838 and sold at an auction in Sydney. One of these lots was purchased by John Dight and the lot was later called Dight's Paddock. Dight then further subdivided the land into 5 acre (2.0 hectare) lots and in 1878 Edwin Trenerry, a Cornwall-based property developer, purchased a large portion of Dight's Paddock for his nephew Fredrick Trenerry Brown and proceeded to further subdivide it for a residential estate.

In order to provide recreational facilities for potential residents and hence boost the value of the lots being offered for sale Fred Brown and solicitor David Abbott created a sports oval sports oval and named it Victoria Park in 1879.

Abbotsford quickly established as an industrial area, home to many Irish, mostly factory workers, and until the construction of Melbourne's sewerage and drainage systems was regularly flooded by the Yarra River.

Since World War II the area has become quite ethnically diverse, with many Greeks, Italians, Vietnamese, Chinese and more recently Arabs and Africans, making it their home.

In the 1960s a section of the northern part of the suburb was demolished to make way for the Eastern Freeway.

Along with Clifton Hill and Collingwood, the suburb was a part of the City of Collingwood, until former State premier Jeff Kennett conducted a wholesale merger of local government areas in 1994.

Property values increased substantially during the 2000s, 2010s and 2020s as Abbotsford underwent significant urban renewal and gentrification. Many former industrial sites were redeveloped into residential apartments, attracting new residents and lots of businesses.

A steady stream of migration since the 1980s has made Abbotsford home to Melbourne's largest Vietnamese community. So much so that Victoria Street is also known as Little Saigon. It is best known for its wide variety of Vietnamese restaurants, which draws tourists to the area from across Melbourne.

== Industry ==
Abbotsford is home to Carlton & United Breweries, the company which produces Victoria Bitter. The malt smell of brewing often fills the surrounding area. More recently established microbreweries are also located in Abbotsford.

== Recreation and leisure ==
Dights Falls, where the Merri Creek and Yarra River converge, is a short walk from the Collingwood Children's Farm. The area was a significant meeting place for peoples of the Kulin nation, where trade, ceremonies and law matters would take place. It remains a significant cultural and recreational site. Pedestrians pass through Collingwood Children's Farm on the Yarra River Trail, which follows the Yarra River from the city to Dight's Falls, where it meets the Merri Creek Trail. This also forms part of the Capital City Trail.

On the eastern side of the Yarra opposite Abbotsford, Studley Park, an extensive parkland which merges with the larger Yarra Bend Park, contains Dights Falls and features within it a golf course, sports grounds, and small pockets of remnant bushland.

== Local landmarks ==
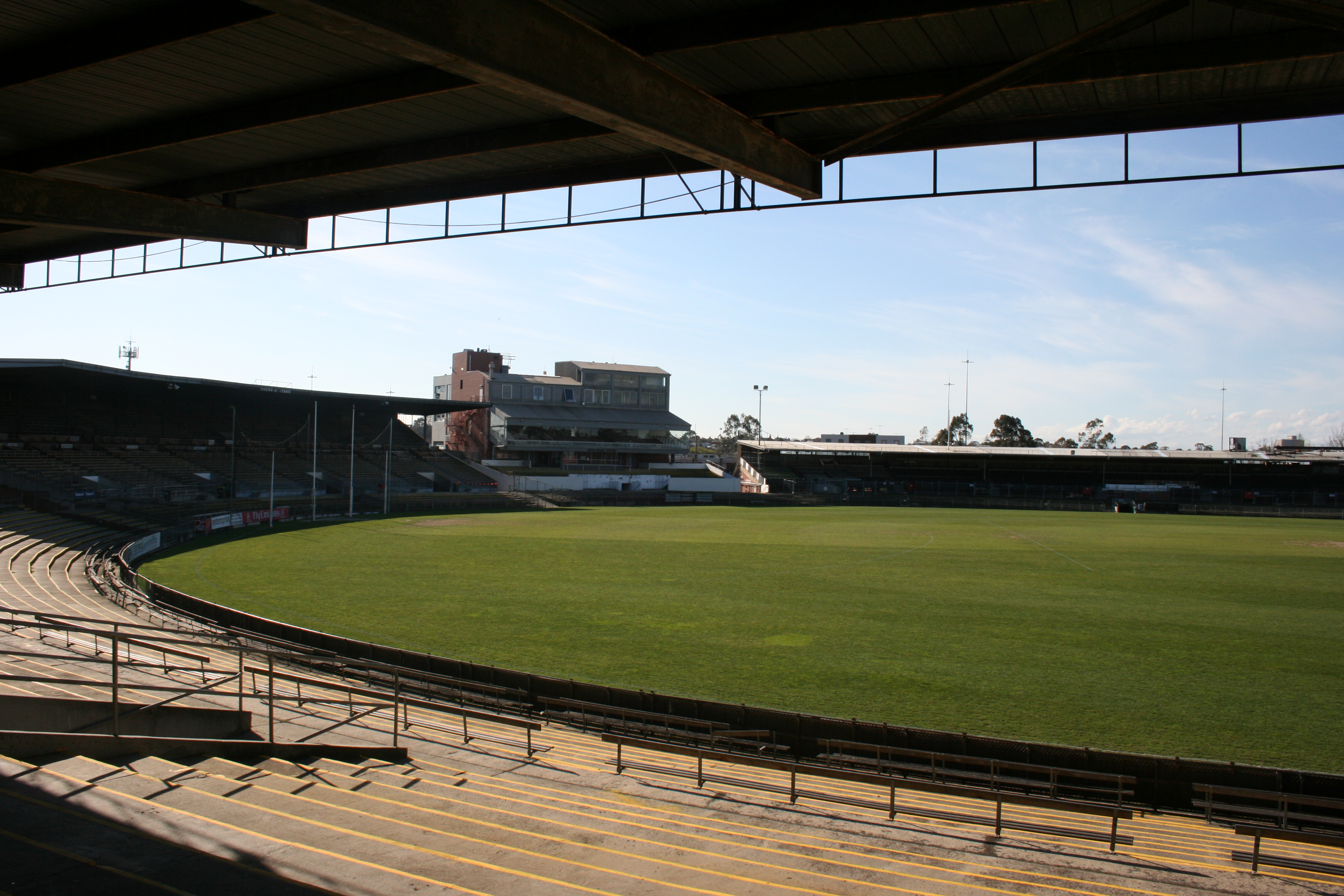
Victoria Park

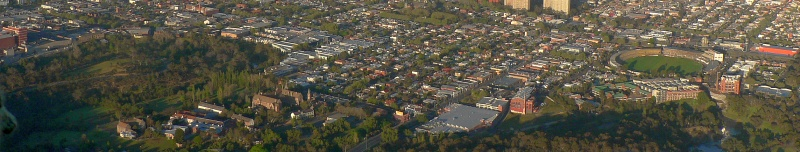
Aerial looking east. Victoria Street (far left); Abbotsford Convent and Yarra River (centre); Victoria Park (right)

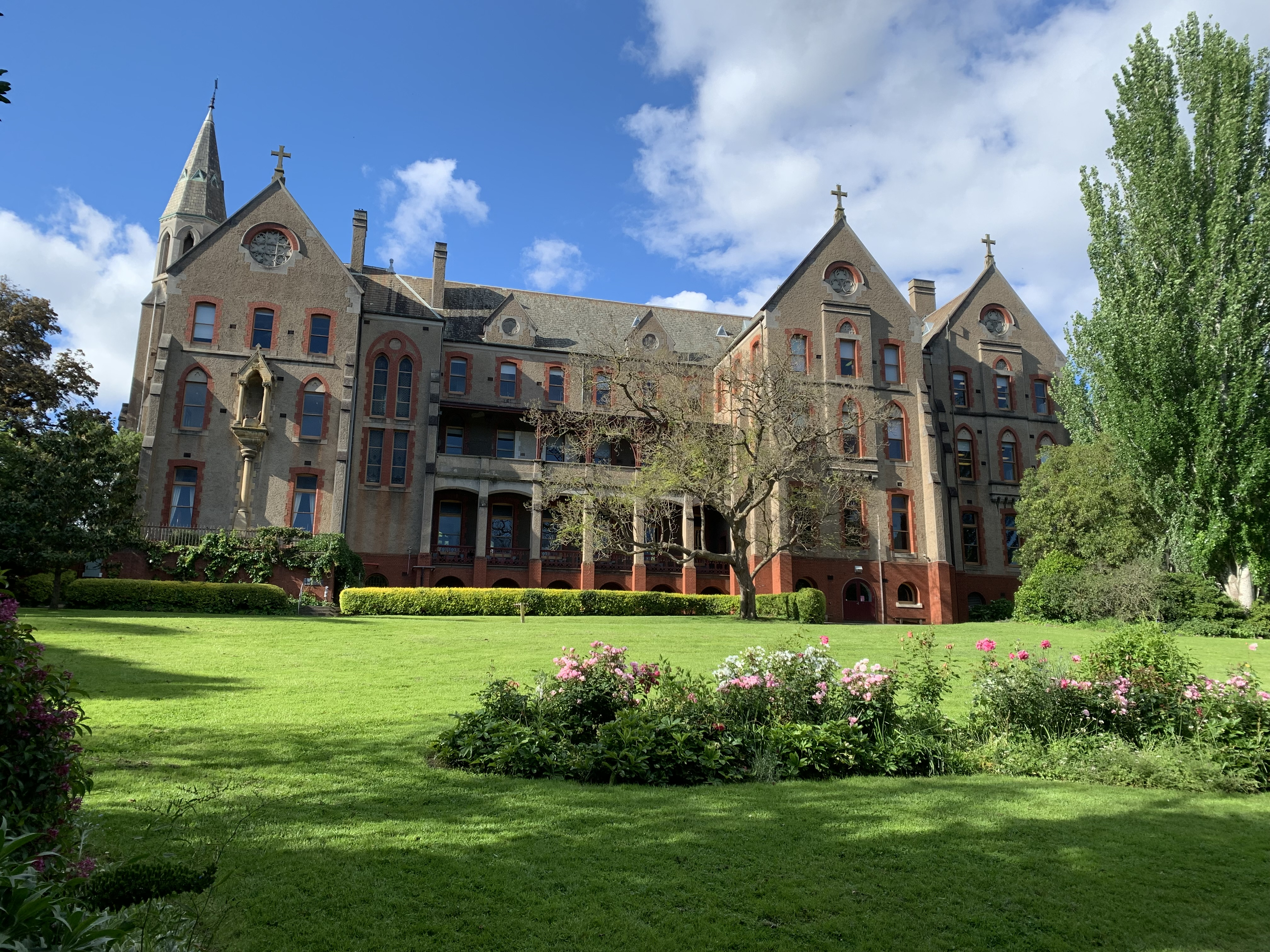
Abbotsford Convent, main building

Victoria Park was the home ground of the Collingwood Football Club from its inception in 1892 until 2005. AFL matches are no longer played there, but Collingwood Football Club's VFL matches are played each season at Victoria Park, with free public entry.

Collingwood Children's Farm was established in 1979 by the local community with the support of the former City of Collingwood and the former Department of Education to give city children "a taste of country life". It is located next to the grounds of the Abbotsford Convent Arts Precinct and a Steiner School, on a bend in the Yarra River. It is a small-holding, fully functioning working farm with rare breeds of livestock, vegetable gardens and fruit orchards.

Community Garden plots are also a part of the Farm. Eggs and seasonal produce are for sale, and visitors are encouraged to interact with farm animals through activities such as cow milking. The Collingwood Children's Farm is sited on the Abbotsford Precinct Heritage Farmlands, the oldest continually farmland in the state of Victoria;

Farming commenced in 1838 (although anecdotal evidence suggests farming commenced as early as 1836) and has continued uninterrupted since then. The former convent itself was also home to the Lincoln Early Childhood Studies Institute and a campus of La Trobe University for a while, but is now the site of a community and arts precinct use after protracted negotiations between developers, the state government and the Yarra City Council. The Abbotsford Convent site was added to the Australian National Heritage List in 2017, recognizing its significance as Australia's largest arts and cultural precinct housed within 11 historic buildings and gardens.

"About - Abbotsford Convent". Abbotsford Convent Foundation. The Skipping Girl Sign, the first animated sequence neon sign in Australia, is located at 627 Victoria Street.

=== Public buildings ===
Abbotsford contains several historic public buildings, most of them centred on the historic Collingwood Town Hall precinct. Among them is the Carringbush Library, a former Church of Christ, built between 1888 and 1889 in the classical style to the design of Jonathan Rankine. It is on the National Trust register. The Sailors and Soldiers Memorial Hall is an unusual looking free classical building constructed in 1927, on Hoddle Street.

=== Housing ===
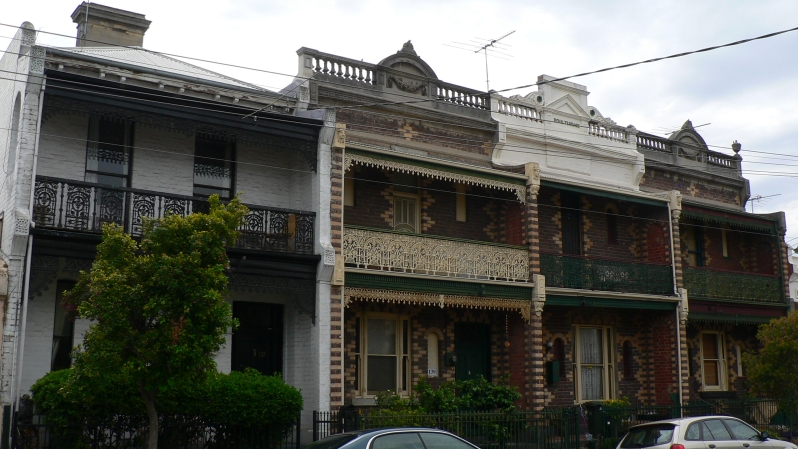
Royal Terrace, Charles Street. Typical double-storey terrace houses in elaborate polychrome brickwork design.

Like many of Melbourne's inner suburbs, there are few detached houses in Abbotsford. Residential streets are often narrow, and some streets are leafy. A large proportion of houses in Abbotsford are subject to heritage overlay provisions, which protect their heritage value. The older residential sections consist mostly of working class single-storey Victorian terrace houses. Some double-storey terraces are found along the railway line and off the tram line on Victoria Street. Many Victorian terrace houses Have been renovated and former industrial areas have been made into mixed-use developments.

Notable examples of terraces in Abbotsford are terraces in Charles Street, and the identical pair of Dorothy and Winniefred terraces in Lulie Street, which are listed on the Victorian Heritage Register. In recent years, many previous industrial and commercial sites have been redeveloped as housing, including sites along the Yarra River and the Denton Mills hat factory.

Many sites have been made into apartments such as the Pace of Abbotsford which has been converted from the former Saint Crispin House shoe factory into 133 apartments, Lulie Abbotsford, (still under construction as of 2026) a development of 60 apartments near Victoria Park Station, and New Johnston, a mixed-use development with 46 apartments.

=== Commercial and industrial ===
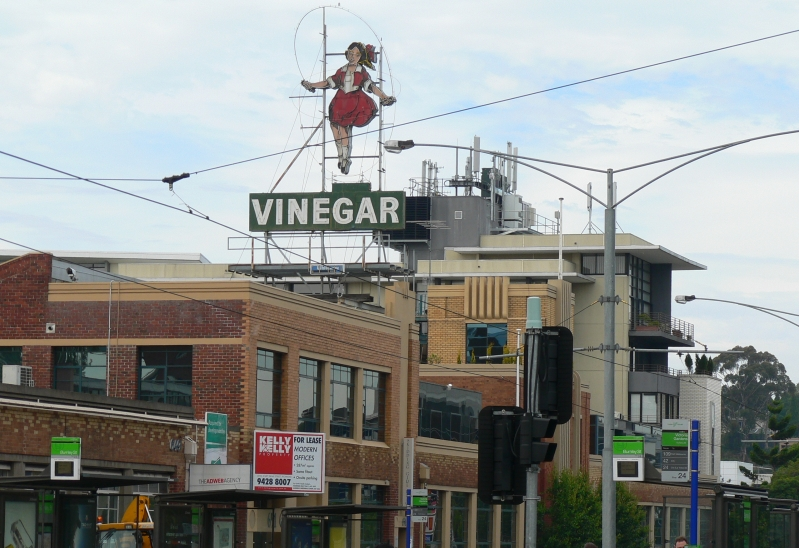
The famous "Skipping Girl Vinegar" (Audrey) sign on Victoria Street

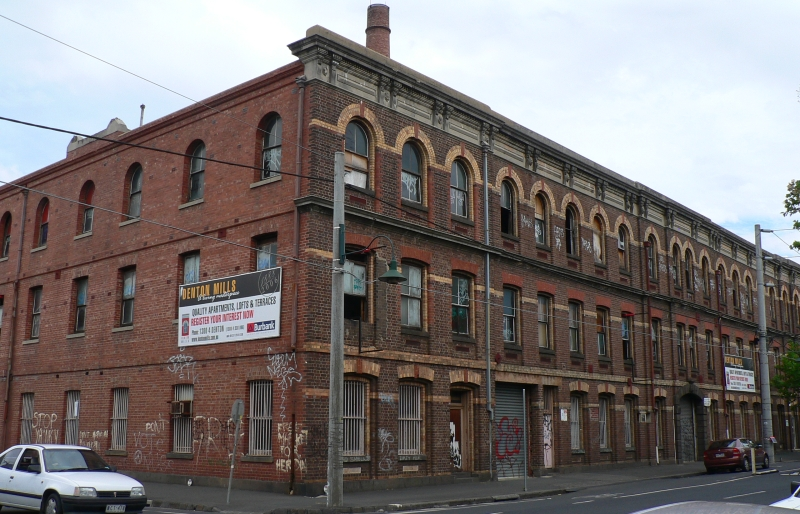
Denton Hat Mills

As a prominent early industrial area, Abbotsford has various outstanding examples of industrial architecture. The most prominent is Denton Hat Mills, a large turn of the century industrial complex designed by architect William Pitt in polychrome brick in 1888. It was the home to Brush Fabrics until 2004, then converted to apartments between 2007 and 2009.

One of the suburb's most prominent hotels is the Carringbush Hotel. It was built in 1889 and was originally named the Friendly Societies Hotel. Others prominent hotels include the Park Hotel, Yarra Hotel and Yorkshire Stingo Hotel. The Retreat Hotel on Nicholson St was the filming location for the Australian drama series The Sullivans (1976–1983).

=== Bridges ===
There are five bridges on the eastern boundary.

- A footbridge across the Merri Creek at Dights Falls.
- The Johnston Street, Studley Park Road bridge. The first bridge was erected in 1858 as a laminated timber arch with laminated timber truss spandrels. It was replaced in 1876 by a riveted wrought iron girder bridge. The current bridge was completed in 1956, featuring reinforced concrete curved-T girders.
- A footbridge connecting Gipps Street and Yarra Bend Park, along the site of Hodgson's Punt. The punt can be seen in Chevalier's painting 'Studley Park at sunrise' (1861). By 1861 the punt had stopped operating. It was probably put out of business by the Penny Bridge nearby. According to a letter to The Argus the Punt was still operating in 1856, but a coronial inquest reported in The Argus of 1859 said the body had been found 'near where the old Hodgson's Punt crossed the river.'
- The 1892 Walmer Street footbridge, connecting Walmer Street Kew and Burnley Street Richmond.
- The 1884 Victoria Bridge, connecting Victoria Street to Barkers Road Hawthorn (later widened). This bridge replaced a ferry.

Between 1857 and 1899 a privately owned toll bridge, or 'Penny Bridge', connected the north end of Church Street to Yarra Bend Park.

== Educational facilities ==
Abbotsford has a government primary school (Abbotsford Primary School), the University of Melbourne Early Learning Centre and the Sophia Mundi Steiner School, which caters for students from Prep to Year 12.

== Transport ==
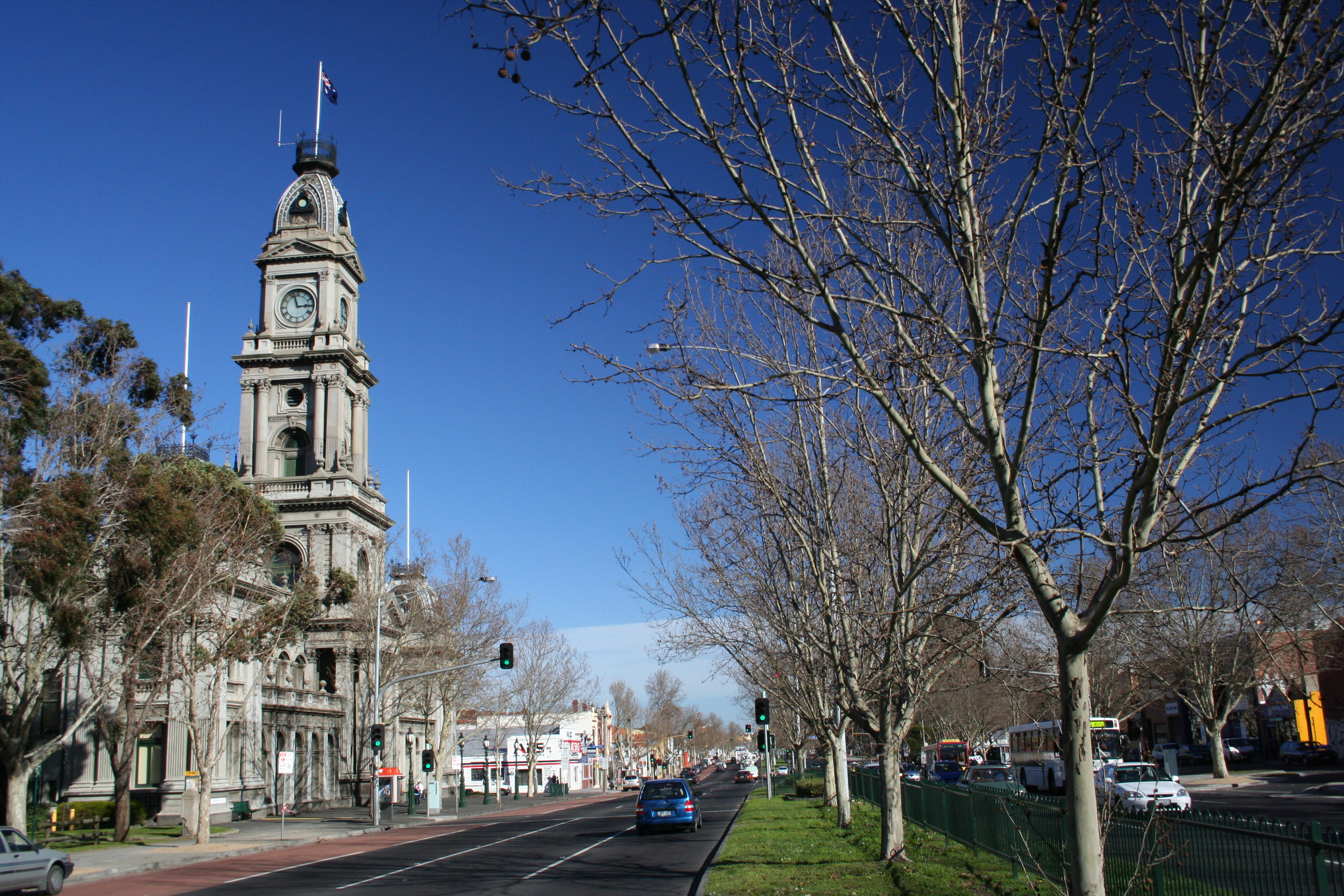
Hoddle Street (looking south toward Collingwood Town Hall) is the main arterial which divides Abbotsford on the left and Collingwood on the right

Two railway stations are located in Abbotsford, both on the Mernda and Hurstbridge lines. Collingwood railway station serves the middle of the suburb. Victoria Park station serves the northern section and Victoria Park stadium. Nearby North Richmond Station also services the southernmost part of the suburb.

Tram route 109 (Port Melbourne/Box Hill), and Tram route 12 (St Kilda/Victoria Gardens) run down Victoria Street and route 78 terminates at the corner of Church Street and Victoria Street (technically in Richmond).

Abbotsford is served by numerous bus routes, including route 200 (City centre to Bulleen Terminus), 207 (City centre to Doncaster Shopping Centre) and 202 (University of Melbourne to Yarra Bend Park) along Johnston Street; and 246 (Clifton Hill to Elsternwick), 302 (City centre to Box Hill Station), 303 (City centre to Ringwood North), 304 (City centre to Doncaster Shopping Centre) and 305 (City centre to The Pines Shopping Centre).

Abbotsford is punctuated by the main streets of Hoddle, Johnston, Victoria and Nicholson Streets. Much of Abbotsford is serviced by narrow one-way streets and laneways. Hoddle Street divides Abbotsford from Collingwood and the Eastern Freeway feeds into it at its northern end. Hoddle Street is a major busway and includes a dedicated priority bus lane along the length of the Abbotsford section.

== See also ==
- City of Collingwood – Abbotsford was previously within this former local government area.
