= Worldwide distribution =

Worldwide distribution may refer to international/global:

- Film distribution
- Distribution (marketing)
  - Global marketing
- Dissemination
- Digital distribution
- Distributed computing
- Species distribution
  - Cosmopolitan distribution
- Logistics

== See also ==
- Globalization
- Worldwide (disambiguation)
- Distribution (disambiguation)
