= APM Music =

American production music company

Associated Production Music, LLC
- Type: Joint venture
- Industry: Music entertainment
- Founded: 1983; 43 years ago
- Founder: Sam Trust
- Headquarters: Hollywood, California, United States
- Area served: North America
- Services: Production music
- Owner: Sony Music Publishing; Universal Music Publishing Group

Associated Production Music, LLC (commonly known as APM Music) is an American production music company headquartered in Hollywood, California, a joint venture between Sony Music Publishing and Universal Music Publishing Group. Its catalog contains more than 1,000,000 tracks, and its libraries include KPM Music, Bruton Music, Sonoton, Cezame, and Kosinus.

Tracks from APM Music have been used in TV shows and films including Dumbo, Us, SpongeBob SquarePants, Teacher's Pet, Green Book and A Star Is Born; and video games, including Skylanders: Imaginators, Call of Duty: Infinite Warfare, Fallout 4, The Godfather II, Red Dead Revolver, Saints Row 2, Saints Row IV, and Tom Clancy's Ghost Recon Wildlands. They were also used in various Motorola phones as ringtones. NFL Films has a joint venture between the NFL and APM Music where music is composed for NFL-related media. The APM catalog includes recordings dating back to 1900, music representing 192 countries, and well-known tracks like "Heavy Action" (the theme for Monday Night Football), "The Big One" (the theme for The People's Court), and "Sweet Victory" (from the SpongeBob SquarePants episode "Band Geeks").

== History ==
APM Music came to be in 1983 as a joint venture between Zomba/Jive Production Music and EMI Production Music (which now are owned by Universal and Sony, respectively). Sam Trust, former head of ATV, founded APM as a joint venture between what is now held by Universal (which owns the Kosinus and Bruton library) and Sony (which owns KPM).

The company was primarily set up to distribute third-party music libraries. Its core business revolves around curation and guiding, where most music is specifically conditioned to fill a market need. Instrumental to such curation is a dedicated team of expertmusic directors with whom clients partner for creative collaboration.

== See also ==
- Trailer music
