= Western Distributor =

Western Distributor may refer to:

- Western Distributor (Sydney), an elevated freeway in Sydney, Australia
- West Gate Tunnel, a proposed toll road and tunnel in Melbourne, Australia initially named Western Distributor

== See also ==
- Distributor (disambiguation)
- Eastern Distributor (Sydney)
