= Charles Grimes Bridge =

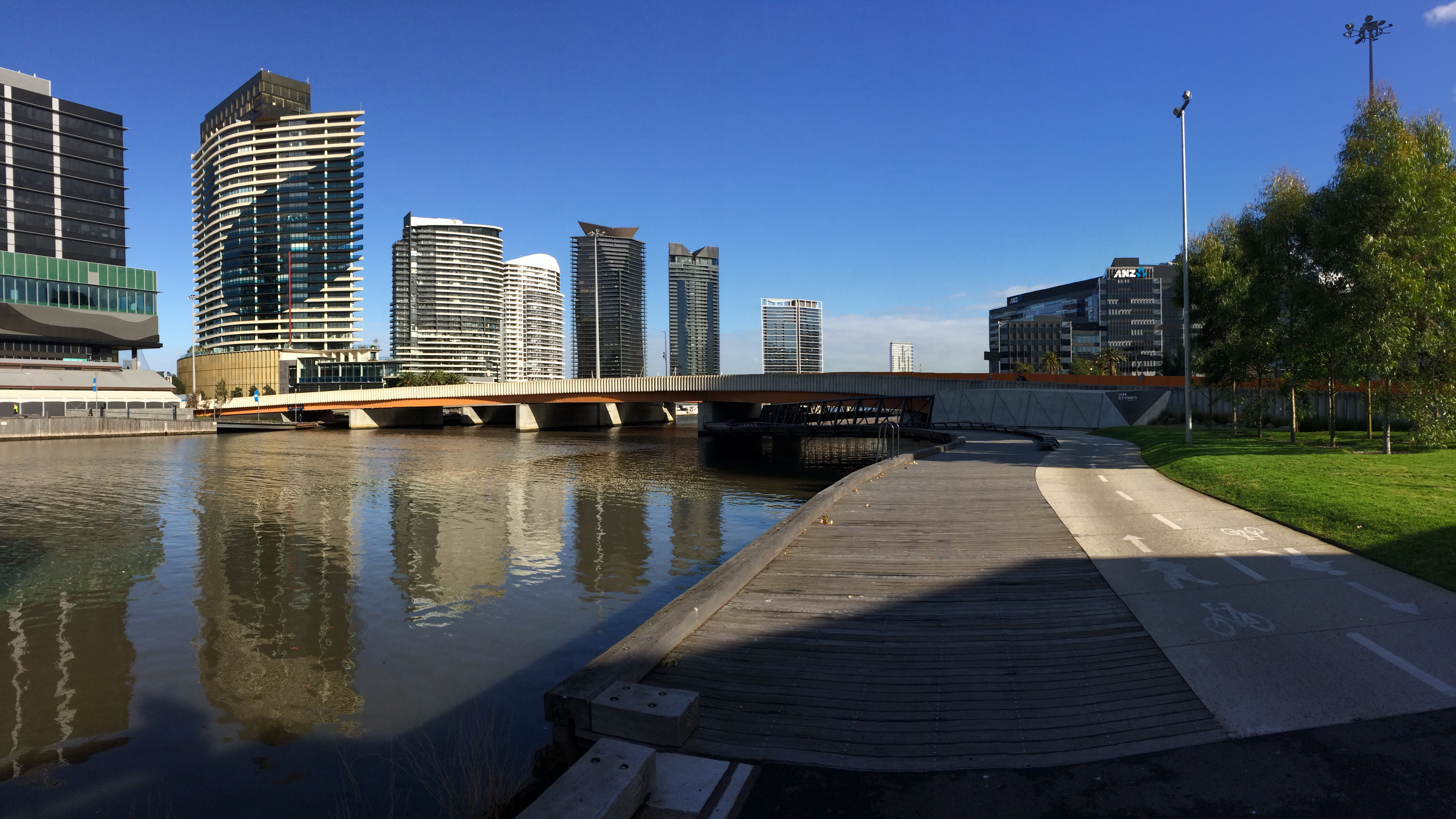
- Coordinates: 37°49′24″S 144°56′53″E
- Carries: Docklands Highway (vehicles; pedestrians; cyclists)
- Crosses: Yarra River
- Locale: Melbourne, Victoria, Australia
- Begins: Melbourne city centre
- Ends: Docklands
- Other name(s): Johnson Street Bridge (1978–1983)
- Named for: Charles Grimes
- Preceded by: Seafarers Bridge
- Followed by: Webb Bridge

Characteristics
- Longest span: 33.5 m (110 ft)
- No. of spans: 10
- Piers in water: 5

History
- Construction cost: c. A$30 million
- Opened: 4 August 1978; 47 years ago

Location
- Interactive map of Charles Grimes Bridge

The Charles Grimes Bridge is a dual-carriageway road bridge that carries the Docklands Highway across the Yarra River, located adjacent to the city centre of Melbourne, in Victoria, Australia. The bridge links the centre centre in the north with the Docklands precinct in the south. It was named after New South Wales surveyor general Charles Grimes, the first European to see the Yarra River.

== History ==
This crossing of the Yarra River was located approximately 700 m (2,300 ft) downstream of the Spencer Street Bridge, supporting dual four-lane structures; the Country Roads Board began construction on the bridge and its approach roads in January 1975. It connected Footscray Road on the northern side of the river to Johnson, Lorimer, Montague and Brady Streets on the south side of the river, and was designed to be compatible with a future extension of the West Gate Freeway. The low clearance of the new bridge over the water would prevent shipping access to wharves and dry-dock facilities upstream, resulting in the closure of a number of the river wharves on the upstream side.

The bridge was known during the construction as the Johnson Street Bridge, and was opened under that name by the Acting Minister of Transport, Alan Scanlan, on 4 August 1978, with the total cost of the bridge and approach works at approximately A$30 million; it was renamed the Charles Grimes Bridge in 1983.

With the Melbourne Docklands redevelopment of the 1990s, Footscray Road was closed as a through-route and rebuilt as Harbour Esplanade, with Wurundjeri Way was constructed to the east as a replacement route. To connect to this new road, Flinders Street was upgraded, and the north end of the Charles Grimes Bridge was rebuilt on an easterly curve to connect to it. Reconstruction started in June 1999, and was completed by 2001.

The bridge superstructure consists of five 33.5-metre-long (110 ft) main spans the river, with five smaller spans between 12 to 24 metres (39 to 79 ft) over the existing wharf and riverbank. Each of the bridges carries four traffic lanes in one direction, and a footpath. Computer analysis was required during design due to the complex geometry of the spans.

The Jim Stynes Bridge was opened in 2014 to carry pedestrian and cyclist traffic underneath the Charles Grimes Bridge, to connect the Docklands precinct to the Northbank area.

== See also ==
- Crossings of the Yarra River

| Next bridge upstream | Yarra River | Next bridge downstream |
| Seafarers Bridge (pedestrians; cyclists) | Charles Grimes Bridge | Webb Bridge (pedestrians only) |
