= Docklands Highway =

Docklands Highway (numerous constituent roads) Victoria
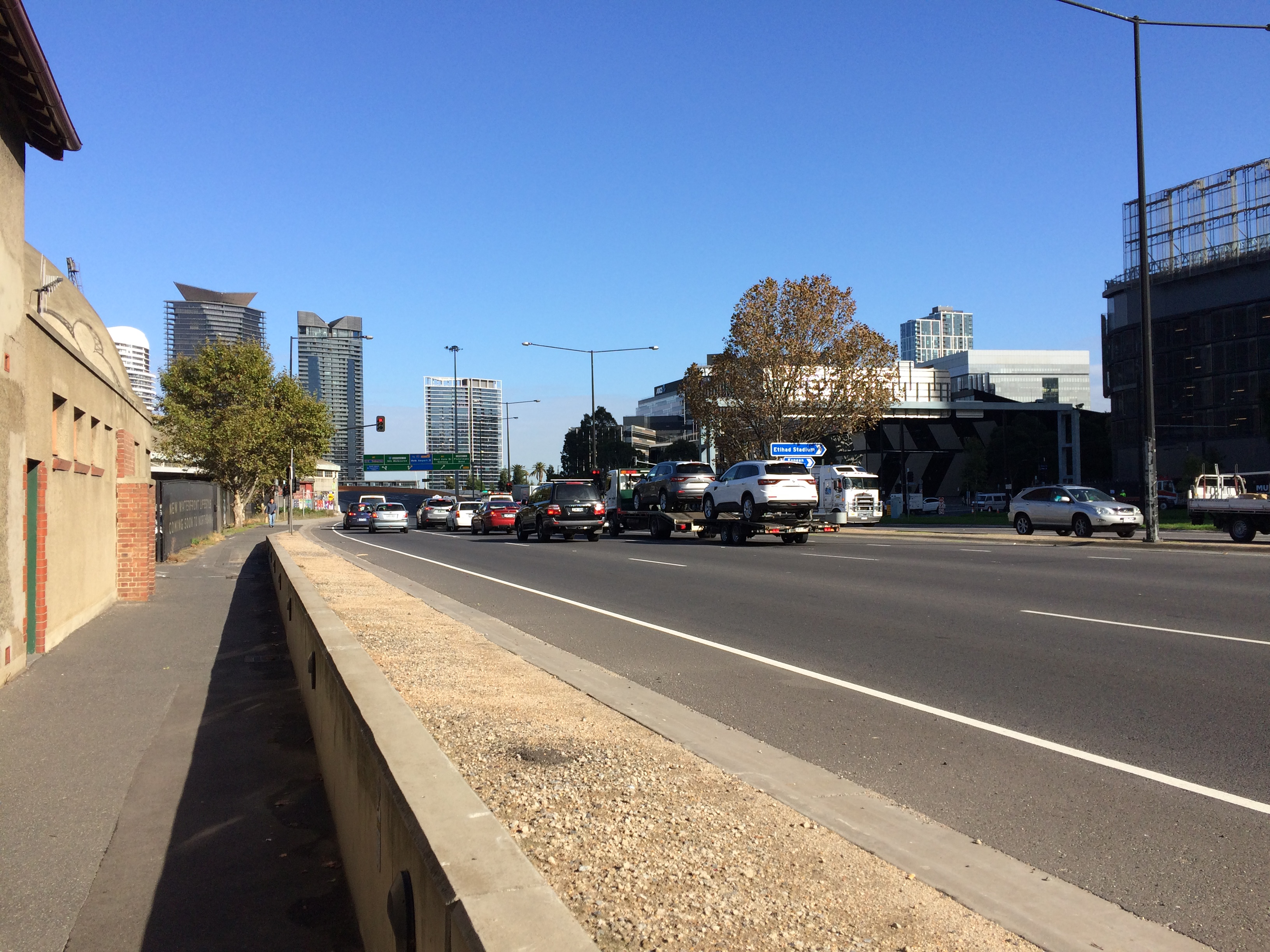
- Looking west along Wurundjeri Way towards the Charles Grimes Bridge, Docklands
- Coordinates: 37.816605°S 144.850082°E (West end); 37.826270°S 144.947347°E (East end)

General information
- Type: Highway
- Length: 12.1 km (7.5 mi)
- Gazetted: June 1990
- Route number(s): Metro Route 35 (1989–present) (Yarraville–Footscray); Metro Route 50 (1989–present) (through Footscray); Metro Route 32 (1965–present) (Footscray–West Melbourne); Metro Route 55 (2005–present) (through Docklands); Metro Route 30 (1989–present) (through Docklands)
- Former route number: Metro Route 2 (1978–1989) (through Docklands); Metro Route 20 (1989–1999) (through Docklands); National Highway 31 (1999–2005) (through Docklands)
- Tourist routes: Tourist Route 2 (1989–present) (through Docklands)

Major junctions
- West end: Geelong Road; Brooklyn, Melbourne
- Millers Road; Williamstown Road; Hyde Street; Somerville Road; Whitehall Street; Napier Street; West Gate Tunnel; CityLink; Dudley Street; Flinders Street; West Gate Freeway
- East end: Montague Street; South Melbourne, Melbourne

Location(s)
- Major suburbs: Footscray, West Melbourne, Docklands

Highway system
- Highways in Australia; National Highway • Freeways in Australia; Highways in Victoria

Docklands Highway is an urban highway stretching 12 kilometres from Brooklyn in Melbourne's inner western suburbs to the Docklands precinct, adjacent to the city. This name covers many consecutive streets and is not widely known to most drivers, as the entire allocation is still best known as by the names of its constituent parts: Francis Street, Whitehall Street, Moreland Street, Napier Street, Footscray Road, Dudley Street, Wurundjeri Way and Montague Street. This article will deal with the entire length of the corridor for sake of completion.

== Route ==
Docklands Highway commences as Francis Street at the intersection with Geelong Road and Millers Road in Brooklyn and heads east as a dual-lane, single-carriageway road, crossing the Newport–Sunshine railway line shortly after and widens to a four-lane, single-carriageway road, continuing east through Yarraville, before turning north along Whitehall Street through the eastern fringes of Footscray (southbound traffic uses Moreland Street for the last 500 metres), before it turns east and runs along Napier Street across the Maribyrnong River and continues east as Footscray Road as an eight-lane, dual-carriageway road through the industrial precinct of West Melbourne. It meets Docklands Drive and Harbour Esplanade on the northern borders of Docklands, turning east to run briefly along Dudley Street before turning south again to run along Wurundjeri Way, as a four-lane, dual-carriageway road, until it meets Flinders Street and turns west briefly to cross the Yarra River over the Charles Grimes Bridge as a six-lane, dual-carriageway road, until terminating at Montague Street shortly afterwards under the interchange with West Gate Freeway.

== History ==
Footscray Road was signed as Metropolitan Route 32 between Footscray and West Melbourne in 1965; Metropolitan Route 35 was re-routed from Hyde Street to Whitehall Street in 1989, while Metropolitan Route 50 formed a concurrency along Whitehall Street in the same year; Metropolitan Route 30 was extended west from Flinders Street along North Wharf Road and across the Charles Grimes Bridge also in 1989; this alignment was subsumed into Wurundjeri Way in 1999. National Highway 31 was re-aligned to run along Wurundjeri Way when it opened in 1999; this was replaced by Metropolitan Route 55 in 2005.

The passing of the Transport Act 1983 (itself an evolution from the original Highways and Vehicles Act 1924) provided for the declaration of State Highways, roads two-thirds financed by the State government through the Road Construction Authority (later VicRoads). State Highway (Francis Street) and State Highway (Whitehall Street/Moreland Street) were declared State Highways in June 1990, along Francis Street from Geelong Road in Brooklyn to Whitehall Street in eastern Yarraville, and then along Whitehall and Moreland Streets to Footscray Road in eastern Footscray. These two highways were fused into one a year later, re-declared the Docklands Highway, and extended east along Napier Street across the Maribyrnong River in June 1991. It was extended again along Footscray Road, across the Yarra River over the Charles Grimes Bridge to end at the interchange of Montague Street with the West Gate Freeway in September 1994, later re-aligned along Dudley Street and Wurundjeri Way when the latter opened in 1999; all roads were known (and signposted) as their constituent parts.

The passing of the Road Management Act 2004 granted the responsibility of overall management and development of Victoria's major arterial roads to VicRoads: in 2004, VicRoads re-declared the road as Docklands Highway (Arterial #6120), from Geelong Road in Brooklyn to Montague Street in Southbank, and as before, all roads are still presently known (and signposted) as their constituent parts.

== Major intersections ==
LGA	Location	km	mi	Destinations	Notes
Hobsons Bay	Brooklyn	0.0	0.0	Geelong Road (Metro Route 83 southwest, Metro Routes 41/83 northeast) – Laverton North, Footscray	Western terminus of highway (declared), western end of Francis Street
Hobsons Bay	Brooklyn	0.0	0.0	Millers Road (Metro Route 41 south) – Altona, Altona Meadows	Westbound traffic left turn only into Millers Road; Access to Geelong Road via service road
Hobsons Bay	Brooklyn	0.7	0.43	Newport–Sunshine railway line	
Stony Creek		2.5	1.6	Bridge (name unknown)	
Maribyrnong	Yarraville	2.8	1.7	Williamstown Road (Metro Route 37) – Kingsville, Williamstown	
Maribyrnong	Yarraville	3.4	2.1	Werribee and Williamstown railway lines	
Maribyrnong	Yarraville	4.1	2.5	Hyde Street (Metro Route 35 south, unallocated north) – Kingsville, Williamstown	Metro Route 35 continues south along Hyde Street
Maribyrnong	Yarraville	4.3	2.7	Francis Street (east) – Holden Oil Dock	Western end of Francis Street, southern end of Whitehall Street
Maribyrnong	Yarraville	5.1	3.2	Somerville Road (Metro Route 50 west, unallocated east) – Kingsville, Sunshine West	Southern terminus of concurrency of Metro Route 50
Maribyrnong	Footscray	6.2	3.9	Napier Street (Metro Route 32 west) – West Footscray, Sunshine West; Whitehall Street (Metro Routes 35/50 north) – Footscray	Northern end of Whitehall Street, western end of Napier Street; Metro Route 32 continues west along Napier Street, Metro Routes 35 and 50 continue north along Whitehall Street; Northern terminus of concurrency of Metro Routes 35 and 50
Maribyrnong	Footscray	6.3	3.9	Moreland Street – Footscray	Northern half of Moreland Street one-way northbound only Southern half of Moreland Street used as southbound section of highway through Footscray; Eastern end of Napier Street, western end of Footscray Road
Maribyrnong River		6.4	4.0	Shepherd Bridge	
Melbourne	West Melbourne	6.8	4.2	MacKenzie Road (south) – Coode Island; Sims Street (north) – West Melbourne	
Melbourne	West Melbourne	7.3	4.5	Dock Link Road – West Melbourne, Swanson Dock	
Melbourne	West Melbourne	8.0	5.0	West Gate Tunnel (M4) – Laverton North, Ballarat, Geelong	Westbound entrance only
Melbourne	West Melbourne	8.4	5.2	West Gate Tunnel (M4) – Laverton North, Ballarat, Geelong	Eastbound exit only, no left turn from West Gate Tunnel into Footscray Road eastbound
Melbourne	West Melbourne	8.4	5.2	Appleton Dock Road – West Melbourne, Appleton Dock	
Melbourne	West Melbourne	8.9	5.5	West Gate Tunnel (M4) – Laverton North, Ballarat, Geelong	Right turn westbound into, and left turn southbound from, West Gate Tunnel only
Melbourne	West Melbourne	8.9	5.5	CityLink (M2) – Melbourne Airport, Port Melbourne	
Moonee Ponds Creek		9.0	5.6	Bridge (name unknown)	
Melbourne	Docklands	9.8	6.1	Docklands Drive (west) – Docklands; Harbour Esplanade (south) – Docklands	Southern end of Footscray Road, western end of Dudley Street
Melbourne	Docklands	10.0	6.2	Dudley Street (Metro Routes 32/55 east) – City; Wurundjeri Way (north) – Footscray	Eastern end of Dudley Street, northern end of Wurundjeri Way; Metro Routes 32 and 55 continue east along Dudley Street; No entry northbound onto Wurundjeri Way from Dudley Street
Melbourne	Docklands	10.9	6.8	Bourke Street – Docklands, Docklands Stadium	
Melbourne	Docklands	11.3	7.0	Flinders Street – City	Northern terminus of concurrency with Metro Route 30 and Tourist Route 2
Yarra River		11.6– 11.9	7.2– 7.4	Charles Grimes Bridge	
Melbourne	Docklands	11.9	7.4	Harbour Esplanade (north) – Docklands	Northbound exit only
Melbourne	Docklands	12.0	7.5	Lorimer Street (west) – Fishermans Bend; Convention Centre Place (east) – Jeff's Shed	Northern end of Montague Street, southern end of Wurundjeri Way
Melbourne–Port Phillip boundary	Docklands–South Melbourne boundary	12.1	7.5	West Gate Freeway (M1 east, M1/Tourist Route 2 west) – Geelong, Dandenong	Southern terminus of concurrency with Tourist Route 2 Tourist Route 2 continues west along West Gate Freeway
Melbourne–Port Phillip boundary	Docklands–South Melbourne boundary	12.1	7.5	Montague Street (Metro Route 30 south) – South Melbourne	Eastern terminus of highway (declared), Metro Route 30 continues south along Montague Street; Southern terminus of concurrency with Metro Route 55
1.000 mi = 1.609 km; 1.000 km = 0.621 mi: Concurrency terminus; Incomplete access; Route transition

== See also ==
- List of Melbourne highways
