= West Gate Distributor =

Road in Victoria, Australia

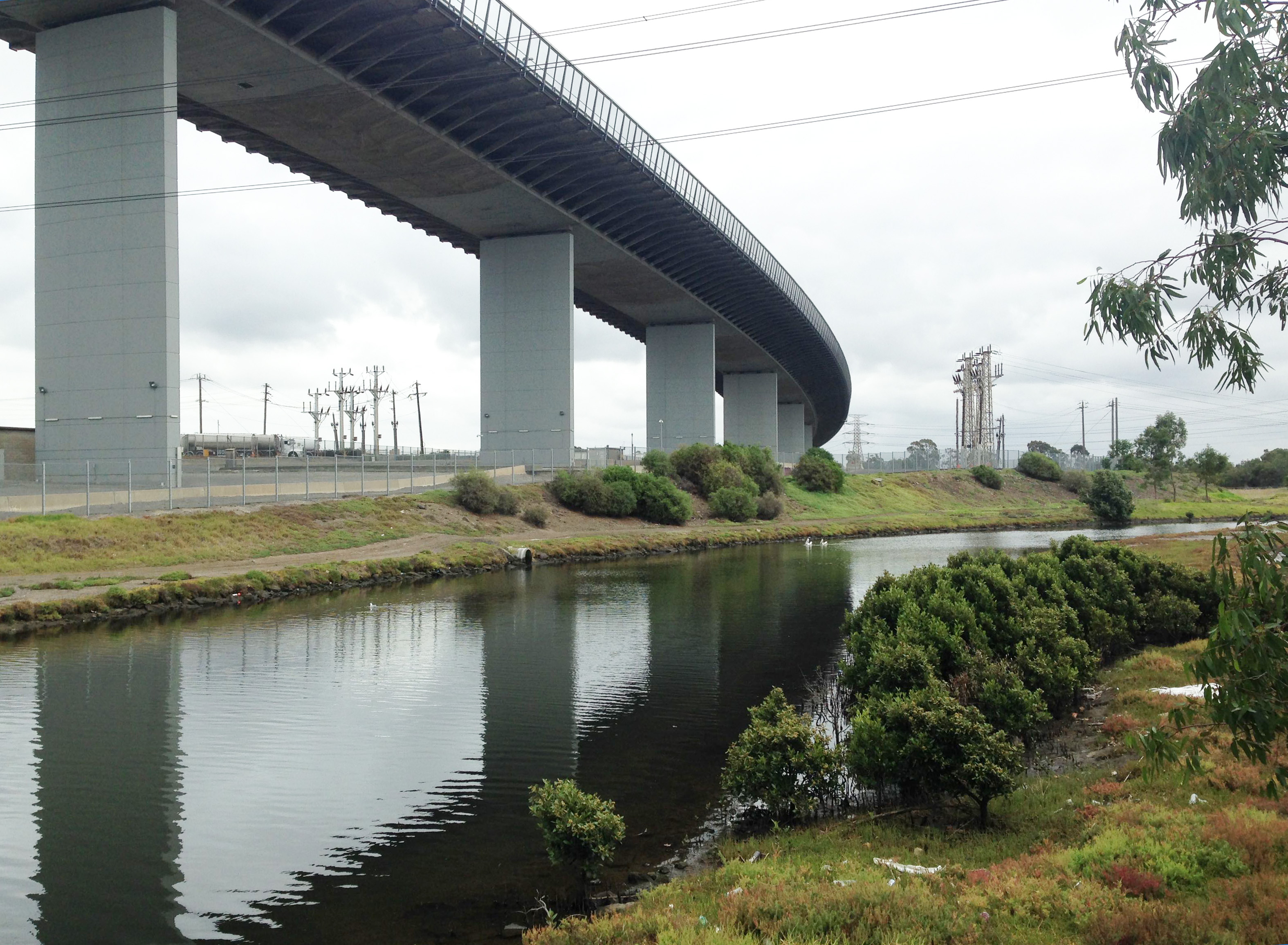
Stony Creek in Yarraville, which would be crossed by a new West Gate Bridge off-ramp as part of the proposed West Gate Distributor.

The West Gate Distributor was a proposed toll road in Melbourne, Australia, to provide access between the West Gate Freeway and the Port of Melbourne, primarily for heavy freight vehicles. The project was eventually scrapped in favour of a similar project known as the Western Distributor (now known as the West Gate Tunnel, which opened 14th Dec 2025.

The project, estimated to cost $680 million, was promised in 2013 by the then Victorian Labor Opposition to allow an estimated 5000 trucks a day to bypass the congested West Gate Bridge. The project was Labor's alternative to the Napthine government's controversial $18 billion East West Link, which it cancelled in April 2015. Labor promised to have contracts for the West Gate Distributor project signed within six months of forming government following the 2014 state election, and said the road would be completed by 2018.

The project would have involved the construction of new lanes on a section of the West Gate Freeway and on-ramps and off-ramps connecting to a new elevated road along Hyde Street, Yarraville. The route was to continue along a widened Whitehall Street and Moreland Street towards Footscray Road, from which trucks could enter the port precinct.

The government awarded a contract in December 2015 for the first stage of the project, which was for road widening, signalling and bridge works, and that work was completed in mid-2017. Plans for further work on the project were abandoned when the government opted in April 2017 to instead proceed with a rival project, the $5.5 billion West Gate Tunnel, which was an unsolicited proposal by infrastructure company Transurban revealed in March 2015.

== Background ==
Plans for the West Gate Distributor project were announced on 19 November 2013 as part of the Labor Party's Project 10,000 transport plan, which promised a range of major road and rail improvements that would provide a transport alternative to the Coalition government's East West Link toll road. Labor said the projects would create a total of 10,000 construction jobs in Victoria.

An artist's representation of the road contained in the Project 10,000 public document showed a two-lane off-ramp for eastbound freeway traffic, located east of the Westgate golf course and Williamstown railway line. The off-ramp continued as an elevated two-lane road that crosses Stony Creek and swept northwards to merge with Hyde Street, south of Francis Street. A parallel two-lane road was to allow southbound vehicles on Hyde Street to exit, then cross Stony Creek, pass under the West Gate Freeway and merge with westbound freeway traffic. Lanes were also to be added in each direction on the West Gate Freeway between Williamstown Road and the Western Ring Road.

Labor's plan was based on a proposal in Sir Rod Eddington's 2008 East-West Link Needs Assessment report, which had recommended the implementation of a Truck Action Plan that would include a new link from the West Gate Freeway to the port via Hyde Street in a bid to reduce truck movements on Francis Street and Somerville Road. The Truck Action Plan was a supplement to a new 18 km east–west cross-city road link. The Eddington study had found that total daily truck movements to and from the Port of Melbourne could more than double from 9000 to 23,000 by 2035.

The announcement of the West Gate Distributor project marked a switch in strategy by Labor leader Daniel Andrews, who in October 2012 had spoken in favour of a second major river crossing in Melbourne's inner western suburbs to provide a road alternative to the West Gate Bridge. Andrews had criticised the Government's staging of the East West Link—announced a month earlier—and urged that the western part of the project should proceed first. From mid-2013 Andrews began opposing construction of the entire East West Link.

== Planning and construction ==
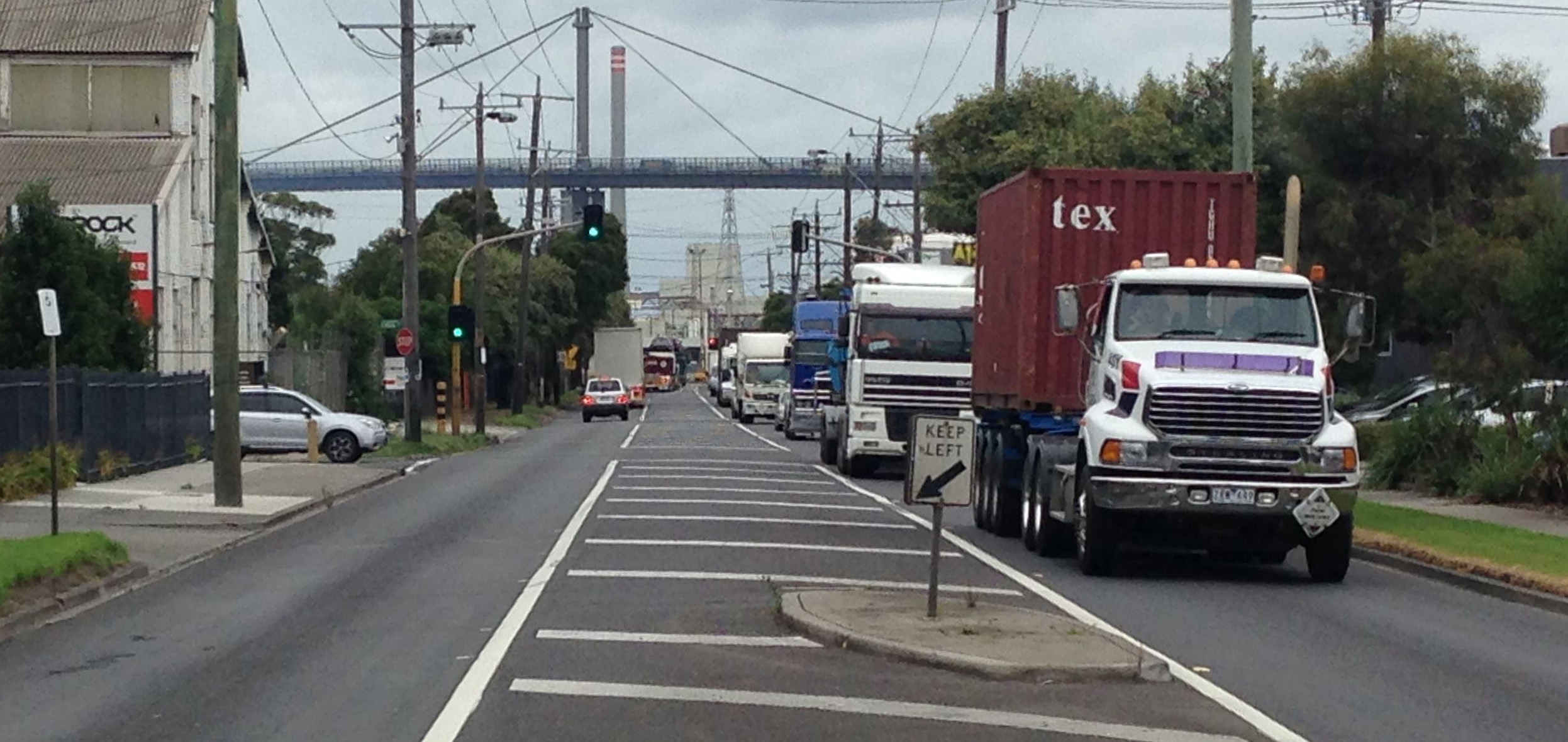
Heavy vehicles at the southern end of Whitehall Street, which would form part of the West Gate Distributor route to the Port of Melbourne. The West Gate Bridge is in the background.

While still in opposition, Andrews announced in September 2014 that the project was "shovel ready" and "ready to go" and that if elected, a Labor government would release the expressions of interest for the project by Australia Day 2015. In January the government called for expressions of interest in stage one, the northern section. That work would involve widening of Moreland Street to provide a four-lane divided road, new traffic signals at Moreland Street's intersection with Footscray Road, Parker Street and Whitehall Street, and the widening and strengthening of Shepherd's Bridge over the Maribyrnong River. A new cycle and pedestrian bridge would also be built alongside Shepherd's Bridge. A contract for stage one was awarded to Fulton Hogan in December 2015; construction was expected to begin in April 2016 and be complete by mid-2017.

Roads Minister Luke Donnellan said some properties would be affected by construction, but said the number of acquisitions would not be revealed until the "preferred alignment" was finalised. Earlier planning for the Brumby government's 2008 Victorian Transport Plan, which had incorporated Eddington's Truck Action Plan, had suggested that up to 21 homes and 22 business properties would need to be acquired for road widening.

== Criticism ==
The Victorian Coalition government disputed Labor's claim that the West Gate Distributor would remove 5000 trucks a day from the West Gate Bridge, citing traffic modelling that showed about 4130 trucks a day travelled to the port's Swanson-Dynon precinct from the west, and that only 30 percent of them—about 1240 trucks—approached by the West Gate Freeway. Western suburbs advocacy group LeadWest has claimed the bypass could backfire, pushing more trucks on to residential streets in Yarraville and Footscray. A spokesman said LeadWest was concerned that westbound drivers exiting the port bound for Brooklyn, Laverton North and Truganina would continue to use inner suburban streets to avoid the gradient on a truck ramp from Hyde Street to the West Gate Freeway. He said drivers would save on fuel and toll expenses by continuing to use suburban streets.

The RACV has criticised the lack of detail in the government's announcements on the project, expressing concern over the potential for traffic confusion resulting from a "spaghetti junction" of ramps between Williamstown Road and the West Gate Bridge. RACV policy manager Brian Negus said the motoring lobby group was waiting to see the detail "because thus far, we've only seen a couple of pages from Labor prior to the election and that doesn't give us good detail".

The Herald Sun has reported that documents prepared by unnamed "environmental agencies" show the construction area is contaminated by dangerous materials including demolition waste that would require cleaning up and delay the project. It said plans to fast-track the work could also be jeopardised because large areas near the bridge and Stony Creek had been classified as areas of cultural heritage sensitivity. The area was reported to have once been used as a food and water source by the Boonwurrung people.

== See also ==
- West Gate Tunnel
- East West Link
