= West Gate Tunnel =

Tollway in Melbourne, Australia

West Gate Tunnel Victoria
- Coordinates: 37.824661°S 144.862108°E (West end); 37.806592°S 144.937877°E (East end)

General information
- Type: Freeway
- Length: 8 km (5.0 mi) (Note: The 8 km length refers to the entire toll road and not just the tunnel section.)
- Opened: 14 December 2025
- Route number(s): M4 (2025–present)

Major junctions
- West end: West Gate Freeway; Yarraville, Melbourne
- CityLink; Footscray Road
- East end: Dynon Road; West Melbourne, Melbourne

Location(s)
- Major suburbs / towns: Yarraville, West Melbourne

Highway system
- Highways in Australia; National Highway • Freeways in Australia; Highways in Victoria

The West Gate Tunnel, formerly known as the Western Distributor, is an 8-kilometre (5.0 mi) freeway-standard toll road in Melbourne, Australia, linking the West Gate Freeway at Yarraville with the Port of Melbourne and CityLink at Docklands. The western half of the toll road consists of twin tunnels - an eastbound tunnel, known as Bundawanh Tunnel, approximately 2.8 km (1.7 mi) long, and a westbound tunnel, known as Eureka Tunnel, approximately 4 km (2.5 mi) long - while the eastern half consists of a new bridge over the Maribyrnong River and an elevated road above Footscray Road.

The tunnel project replaced an earlier $680 million freight route proposal, the West Gate Distributor, which the Victorian Labor Party had taken to the 2014 state election as an alternative to the abandoned East West Link tollway.

The Labor government announced in December 2015 that it would proceed with the tunnel project, with an initial construction cost of $5.5 billion. Planning approvals were granted in December 2017 and major construction began in January 2018. It was scheduled for completion on 30 September 2022, although delays related to disposal of contaminated soil pushed its opening back 3 years with an eventual cost of $10.2 billion. It opened on 14 December 2025.

== Route ==
The West Gate Tunnel commences with two separate interchanges with the West Gate Freeway in Yarraville - the first portal to the Eureka Tunnel servicing out-going westbound traffic, then the second portal to the Bundawanh Tunnel servicing in-bound eastbound traffic 1.4 km further east - and heads northeast as a pair of subterranean tunnels, each with three lanes, continuing underneath Yarraville. The tunnels emerge to the surface to immediately cross the Maribyrnong River, and continues east as dual-carriageway elevated freeway running above Footscray Road, through the industrial precinct of West Melbourne, with ramps connecting freight traffic directly to the Port of Melbourne. After continuing east under CityLink through the South Dynon railway yards, the road then shares a series of at-grade intersections with access roads to Docklands and the city, before eventually terminating at the intersection with Dynon Road in West Melbourne.

== History ==
=== Background and funding ===
The project was first proposed by infrastructure company Transurban to Victorian Labor opposition in 2014 as a means of alleviating congestion on the M1 corridor, providing a new river crossing as an alternative to the West Gate Bridge and moving trucks out of residential streets in the city's inner west. The project also involved widening the West Gate Freeway from eight to 12 lanes between the M80 Ring Road and the West Gate Bridge. Although discussions with Transurban continued through that year and into 2015, it remained undisclosed through the 2014 election campaign until a public announcement in April 2015 after Labor had won government.

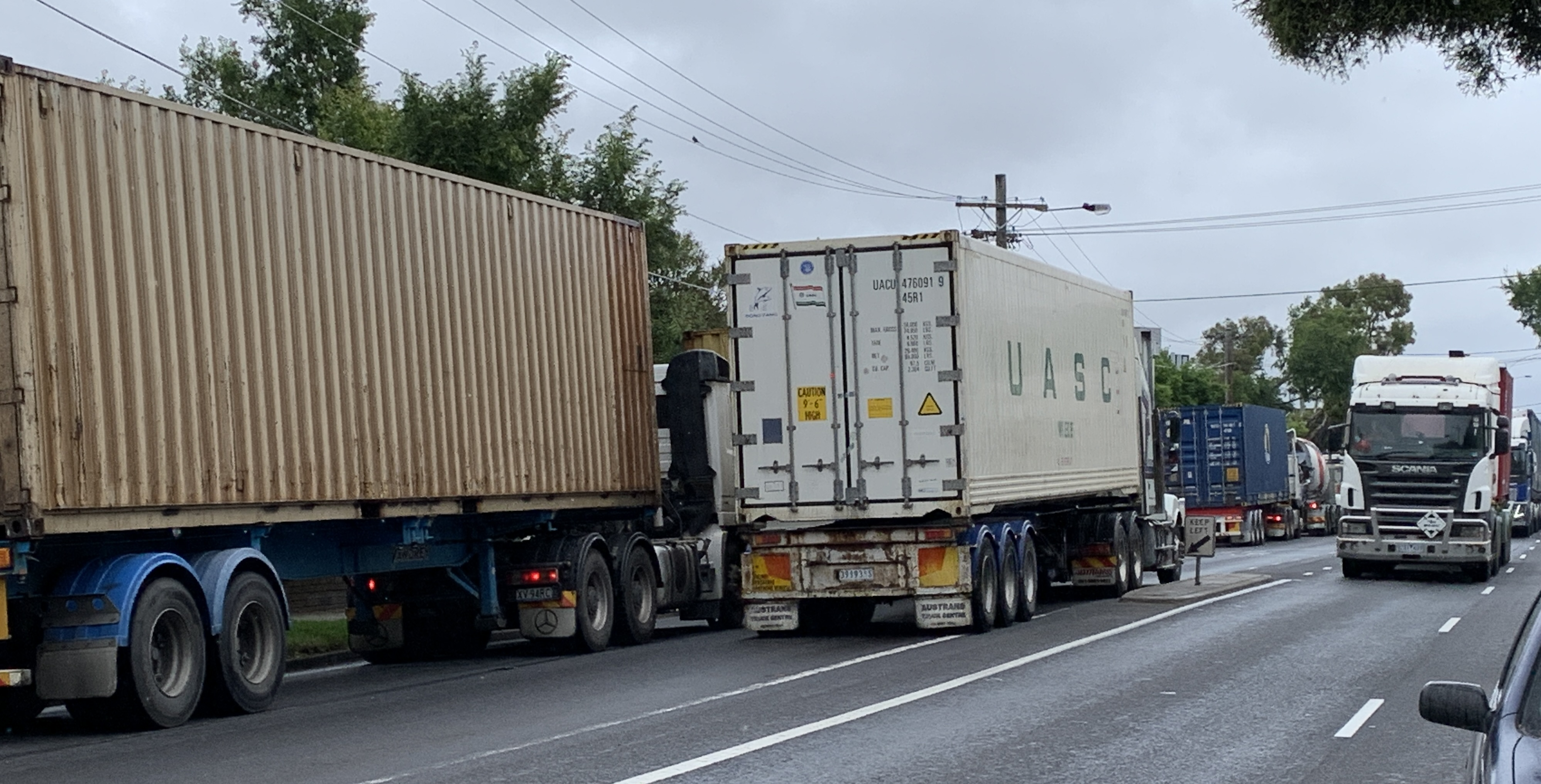
Freight trucks from the Port of Melbourne use Francis Street, Yarraville, in Melbourne's inner west, to access the West Gate Freeway. The route will be replaced by the West Gate Tunnel.

Transurban proposed that it would cover two-thirds of the estimated $5.5 billion cost of construction, with its costs recouped by tolling the road for up to 25 years and also being awarded a 10 to 15-year extension of its CityLink toll contract, which had been due to expire in 2035. The remainder of the cost would be borne by federal government funds. As part of the funding deal, Transurban was granted a 10-year extension on tolling its Melbourne roads and permitted to raise its tolls by 4.25 percent a year from July 2019. Its construction contract gave the company tolling and operational rights on the new toll road until 13 January 2045.

The Victorian government began assessing the proposal in March 2015 and announced in December that it would proceed. It said it would contribute $400 million of state funds and proposed seeking funds previously committed by the federal government to the abandoned East West Link project. The decision to proceed marked the end of continued work on the government's $680 million West Gate Distributor, which in turn had been designed to partially replace the western section of the East West Link.

The state government submitted the business case to Infrastructure Australia and the federal government in December 2015 with a request for Commonwealth funding. It announced the project would also include the widening of the West Gate Freeway from eight to 12 lanes between the M80 Ring Road and Williamstown Road and a $400 million widening of the Monash Freeway. When the federal government in April 2016 ruled out contributing to the project, the state government said it would proceed without federal funding, allocating $1.4 billion to the project over four years.

A 2019 report by the Victorian parliament's independent budget office found that by 2044–45, Transurban stands to make an extra $37 billion, in nominal terms ($7.5 billion in present value terms) as a result of the new CityLink tolls, combined with tolls on the new West Gate Tunnel project. The report showed that CityLink tolls will generate more revenue for Transurban than tolls on the West Gate Tunnel, which are valued at nearly $11 billion (nominal) by 2044–45. State Opposition leader Michael O'Brien described the Transurban toll deal as "Labor's Grand Theft Auto. Who does a deal where Transurban puts in $4 billion and gets $37 billion out of it"?

The proposed route underwent some modification since plans were first released. The final plan was for eastbound traffic using the Western Distributor to exit the West Gate Freeway via a tunnel portal near Williamstown Road. Vehicles will emerge from the tunnel near Whitehall Street in Yarraville, then ascend to a new bridge over the Maribyrnong River and onto an elevated road above Footscray Road, from where they will gain access to Swanson Dock at the Port of Melbourne, CityLink and the CBD via Docklands. A new link between the West Gate Freeway and Hyde Street—essentially the off-ramp and on-ramp component of the original West Gate Distributor—will allow placarded trucks carrying dangerous loads such as fuel to directly access the freeway network for either eastbound or westbound travel rather than use local streets.

In April 2017 the project was re-badged as the West Gate Tunnel.

A doubling of the length of the twin tunnels since the first plans were released led to a $1.2 billion blowout in construction costs over its initial $5.5 billion budget; in August 2021 Transurban revealed cost overruns linked to contaminated soil had risen to $3.3 billion, taking the total cost of the project to $10 billion, almost double the original estimate, although media reports claimed the blowouts were even higher, with a total cost as high as $11.9 billion. The Victorian government announced in December 2021 it would contribute another $1.9 billion to the construction costs, while Transurban would pay another $2.2 billion, and the builders would forego $1 billion, taking the total cost to $10.2 billion.

=== Business case ===
A partly-redacted business case for the Western Distributor was released in December 2015. In a move that was later criticised by the Victorian Auditor-General, the business case also included lane widening and other freeway improvements on the West Gate and Monash Freeways, between 15 km and 60 km from the core West Gate Tunnel project. The business case concluded that the project had investment merit and would result in greater productivity, a more competitive port, less reliance on the West Gate Bridge and better liveability, particularly in the inner west. It found a benefit cost ratio (BCR) of 1.3 using "conservative state modelling" and explained: "What this means is for every $1 invested, the project will bring at least $1.30 benefit." With the Monash Freeway works excluded, the BCR was 1.1.

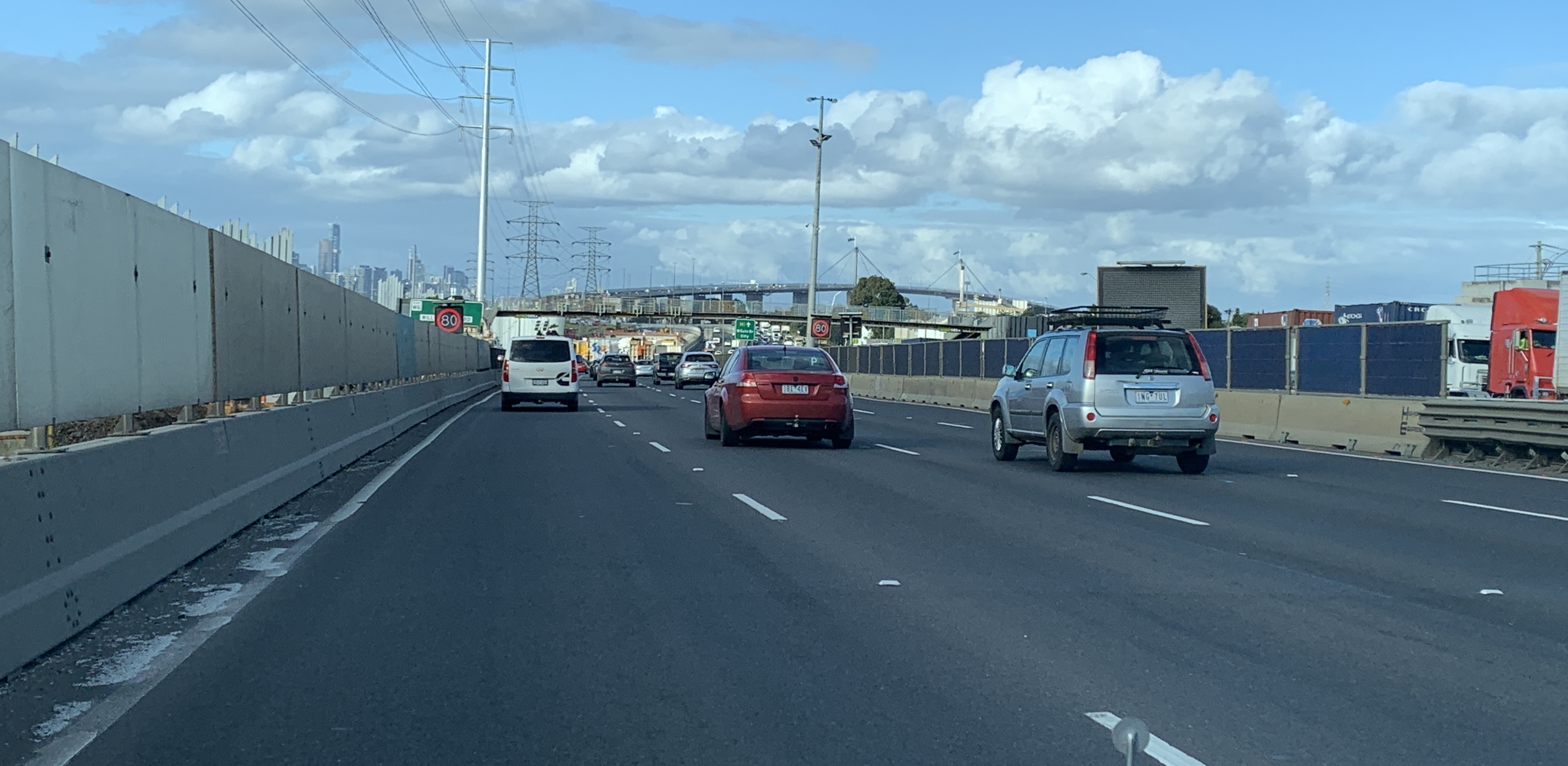
Construction work on the West Gate Freeway near the proposed southern portal of the West Gate Tunnel in 2020

It highlighted two corridors that had been identified in the 2008 Investing in Transport–East West Link Needs Assessment infrastructure report by businessman Rod Eddington: a northern route connecting CityLink and the M80 under Footscray, and a southern route connecting CityLink and the West Gate Freeway in the vicinity of Williamstown Road. It said rapid traffic and population growth suggested the need for both corridors in the long term, but identified the southern route as the one that would produce benefits earlier and greater over time than the northern one. It said: "The southern corridor is likely to be a medium term solution. It accommodates future construction of the northern corridor and provides the 'real option' to defer significant investment in the northern corridor for 10 to 15 years. Pathway 1 (the southern route) addresses current needs ... it would also permit enhanced planning for the northern corridor in a more considered timeframe to optimise land use in the west and provide certainty to industry and residents."

The business case forecast that the tunnel project would carry approximately 25,000 to 35,000 vehicles a day in each direction across the Maribyrnong River by 2031, or a total of 50,000 to 70,000 in both directions. It said the majority of vehicles on the new route would originate from the outer west suburbs, with 20 to 25 percent of vehicles in the morning peak coming from the M80 Ring Road or Deer Park Bypass and 40 to 45 percent coming from the Princes Highway. It forecast that by 2031 16,000 to 22,000 vehicles would be taken off the West Gate Bridge as a result of the project, reducing the reliance on the West Gate Bridge for travel between the west and the CBD and eastern suburbs and providing greater redundancy in the road network. It said 9,000 to 11,000 trucks a day would use the route, which would remove 4000 to 6000 trucks a day from the West Gate Bridge and 2,500 to 3,500 trucks from Geelong Road.

The report noted that the arterial road network in Melbourne's west was used by trucks to access the port and industry in the inner west. It said: "These roads, located in largely residential areas, are disconnected, poorly configured and inadequate for such travel. Unless access is improved, the number of trucks on local inner west roads will more than double in 2031, reducing the liveability of the inner west and increasing pressure on Port activities." It said the tunnel project would reduce the number of trucks using local arterial roads, leading to improved amenity in the inner west. It also recommended extended truck curfews to help achieve that, urging fulltime curfews be imposed on Francis Street and Somerville Road through Yarraville and Seddon.

The project's business case provided "indicative" toll fees for using the 5 km road and tunnel of $3 for cars and $13 for trucks, although Transurban said it might exempt trucks carrying dangerous placarded goods as an incentive to remove those trucks from local streets. Trucks used as container shuttles might also qualify for a reduced toll price and daily cap to encourage them to avoid inner west streets.

Quizzed at a parliamentary accounts committee in June 2022, Transport Infrastructure Minister Jacinta Allan did not answer questions on whether the $3.9 billion cost overruns for the project had diminished its cost benefit ratio.

=== Environment Effects Statement ===
In May 2017 the state government released the project's Environment Effects Statement (EES), which assessed its environmental, social and health impacts. The community was given 30 business days to review the 10,000-page document and hearings began on 14 August 2017.

The report found that with port freight volumes almost doubling between 2012 and 2031, truck numbers on the West Gate Freeway, West Gate Bridge and several inner west roads would grow markedly. It said the project's objectives were to improve transport performance in the M1 corridor, reduce reliance on the West Gate Bridge, improve freight access to the Port of Melbourne and greater Melbourne, and improve community amenity on local streets in the inner west. The EES concluded that it met those objectives, diverting 8000 trucks a day from the bridge, providing direct freeway access to the port, removing a net 9300 trucks a day from local roads in the inner west and reducing peak period travel times across the city's primary western road corridor.

==== Traffic impacts ====
Traffic projections in the EES for the tunnel and road link revised patronage levels from those contained in the business case, with a significant increase in truck estimates. Total daily vehicle projections were now 55,000 to 67,000, which included between 13,200 and 16,200 trucks (up from 9000 to 11,000). The project's effect on West Gate Bridge truck traffic also underwent revision: its claim that 8000 trucks a day would be taken off the bridge was as much as double the 4000-6000 estimate in the business case. Although the EES cited a net reduction of 9300 trucks daily on several major roads in the inner west, it also revealed they would "increase significantly" on two key inner west residential routes—truck numbers would double on Williamstown Road, while on Millers Road they would more than triple to almost 15,000 a day.

At the city end of the project, Dudley Street traffic volumes were tipped to fall slightly, but Dryburgh, Arden, Curzon, Queensberry and Victoria streets were all projected to receive between 1500 and 3500 additional vehicles a day. A widened and extended Wurundjeri Way would carry an extra 9000 vehicles a day in both directions.

==== Health, amenity and environmental quality ====
Tunnel ventilation structures were deemed to be generally compliant with environmental standards. Air quality was expected to improve near roads that would be the subject of permanent truck curfews, but increased traffic volumes on some roads, including Millers Road and Geelong Road, would have a negative effect on air quality. (Note: EES findings on Williamstown Road indicate the level of conflicting information in technical reports on transport, air quality and human health impacts. While Technical Reports A (transport impacts, p.346) and L (Social impacts, p. 49) noted trucks would increase by 1500 a day, and maps in Technical Report A (p.116, 345) indicate the increase could be as much as 2100 trucks a day, or almost double the 2016 figure, Technical Report G (air quality, p.162, 213) stated the increase was just 750 trucks a day, or a 56 percent rise, but also said pollution concentrations would fall on Williamstown Road "due to the reduction in HCVs". Williamstown Road modelling, conducted by Barry Cook, James Forrest, David Featherston and Len Ng of Golder Associates, was based on receptors at a single location at the intersection with Thomas Street, which will benefit from a projected 40 percent reduction in truck volumes when the tunnel opens. (p.220,221) No modelling was conducted for sections of the road where truck volumes will increase.) The EES Social Impact Assessment noted the significant heavy traffic increases for both Millers and Williamstown roads were problematic for residents. Millers Road residents would suffer a decrease in safety and amenity and greater difficulty in reaching services and facilities south of the West Gate Freeway, while on Williamstown Road it would affect connectivity and travel times, as well as affecting the likelihood of cyclists and pedestrians using and crossing the road. Of Williamstown Road, the report noted: "This is a significant change for a road which has a high proportion of residential frontages, and high density residential areas east and west of the road itself."

==== Submissions ====
Hobsons Bay City Council said the toll road would lead to a significant rise in truck traffic on Millers Road, which would mean "persistent noise, increased delays and degraded air quality, each negatively affecting overall quality of life". The council recommended upgrading Grieve Parade as the preferred truck route (via Princes Highway) to access the West Gate Freeway, with an extension northward to Market Road, Tottenham, an upgraded freeway interchange including additional ramps to and from the M80 Western Ring Road, and new west-facing ramps to Dohertys Road and Princes Freeway. The council submission also said a corridor study was required on Millers Road between Geelong Road and Blackshaws Road to seek ways of mitigating impacts of additional truck traffic.

Maribyrnong City Council said the project was an important opportunity to improve the health and liveability of inner west suburbs, but criticised components of it. It sought the exploration of a new road connection to the freeway via the Paramount Road corridor in Tottenham to mitigate the effects of the tunnel project on Brooklyn residents and provide an alternative means of access to the tunnel and the port.

An analysis by the City of Melbourne of the traffic modelling presented in the EES found the tunnel project would result in peak hour-like traffic conditions for 12–14 hours a day on four roads in North Melbourne, negatively affect tram performance across northern Melbourne and possibly undermine future tram improvements. The council's submission was harshly critical of the EES, describing it as fundamentally flawed because it failed to investigate and document relevant alternatives for the project. It concluded: "In truth, this is not an EES; rather it's a sales brochure. It is designed to sell the project, and to create the illusion of independent, rigorous analysis."

The council said the fact that Infrastructure Victoria had not been asked to carry out any independent assessment of the project was "yet another example of what appears to be a strategy to avoid independent scrutiny of the merits of the project". The council said that although traffic modelling was fundamental to the EES, the degree of its reliability could not be reliably ascertained because the model was a "black box", providing outside parties with no opportunity to carry out rigorous independent peer review of its findings. The council said a peer review had been undertaken by a "partisan witness" but the results of that review had been suppressed by the Western Distributor Authority. (Note: Melbourne City Council lodged a formal request with the Inquiry and Advisory Committee that it direct the Western Distributor Authority to produce the peer review by John Allard of the Veitch Lister Consulting Zenith traffic modelling in order to assess its reliability. The IAC accepted the relevance of the VLC Zenith modelling to the project but accepted submissions from the WDA that they fell into the category of Cabinet documents and their disclosure would therefore be contrary to the public interest. See IAC ruling, 7 September 2017.)

The Maribyrnong Truck Action Group said the EES failed to acknowledge the serious health impacts of diesel particulates. It claimed the EES contained inaccurate and misleading air quality and modelling and out-of-date background modelling and criticised the absence of an air filtration system for the project's tunnel. MTAG found "alarming" negative community impacts resulting from increased heavy vehicle traffic on Williamstown Road, Millers Road, Blackshaws Road and the West Gate Freeway. It called for truck bans on Williamstown Road, which would experience an increase of 1500 trucks a day between Geelong Road and Somerville Road, with a resultant rise in air pollution. It also called for truck bans on Millers Road north of the freeway, where truck traffic would increase by 7000 trucks a day, as well as Hudsons Road, Spotswood west of the railway line.

==== Inquiry and Advisory Committee report ====
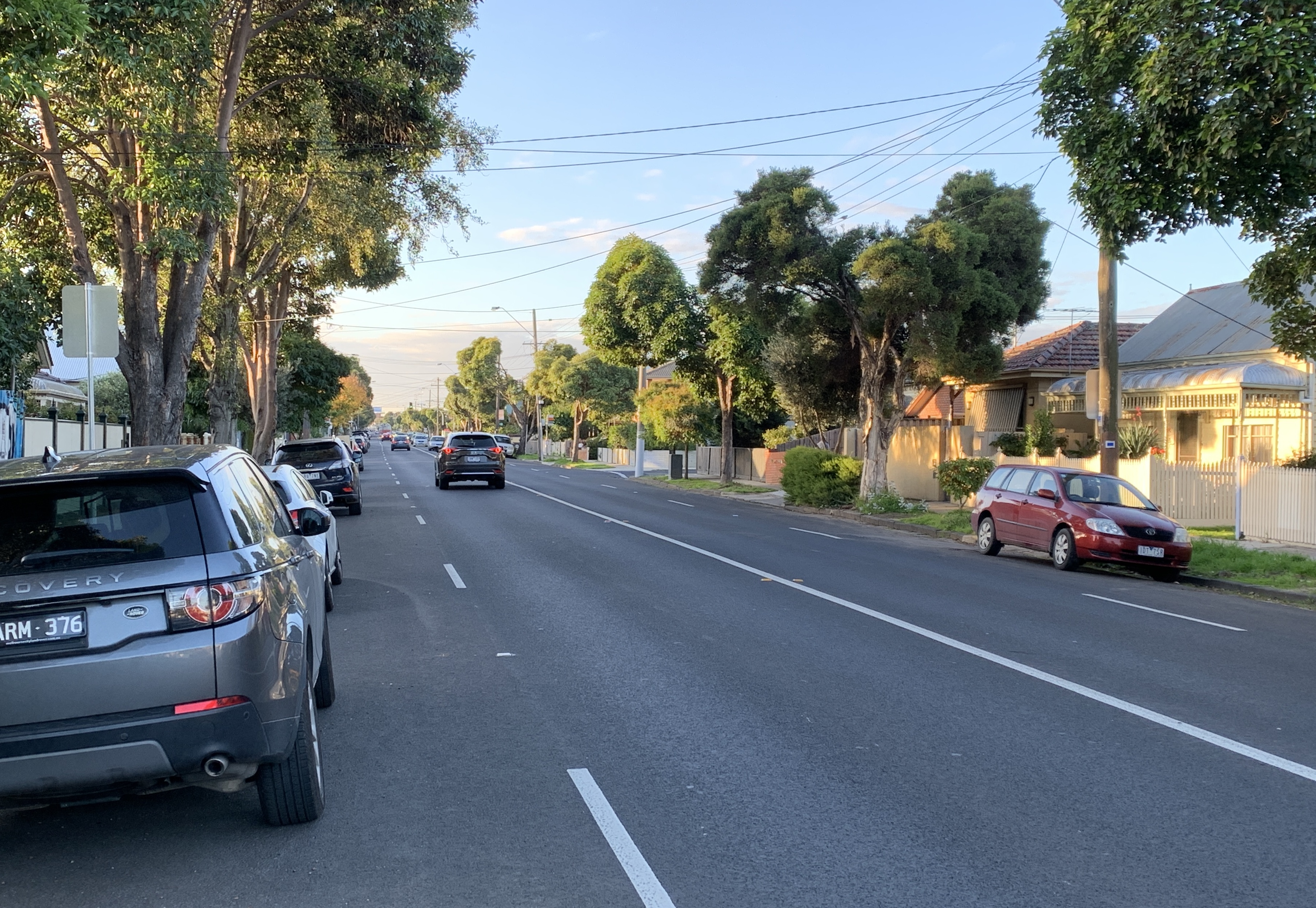
Williamstown Road, Seddon, which is expected to receive a "significant increase" in truck numbers once the tunnel is built

A review of the EES by the Inquiry and Advisory Committee (IAC) was released on 23 October 2017. The IAC's role was to review the draft Planning Scheme Amendment and submissions, to conduct a hearing process and to report to the Minister for Planning on the adequacy and appropriateness of proposed planning controls. It reported: "On balance, considering the adverse and beneficial environmental effects overall, the IAC considers the environmental effects of the Project can be managed to an acceptable level and the Project approvals should be granted."

It acknowledged repeated criticism in submissions that the project failed to address public transport matters objectives contained in the Transport Integration Act 2010, but noted the Western Distributor Authority's response that it should be seen as complementary to projects such as the Metro Tunnel rail project and level crossing removal. The IAC said the project was likely to impose significant constraints on the urban renewal area at E-Gate in West Melbourne, primarily through the elevated Wurundjeri Way extension and said a "demonstrably superior outcome" should be possible. It said the project should aim to contribute to improvements in air quality and recommended that pollution control equipment be installed on the tunnel ventilation system.

The IAC said there would be an overall reduction in trucks on residential streets, producing beneficial environmental effects, although fulltime truck bans in Yarraville and Footscray would result in negative environmental effects because of a "significant increase" in truck volumes on Millers Road and Williamstown Road. It said Millers Road would suffer increasing impacts over time but that the physical and environmental capacity limits on that road had not been explored in the EES. The report said the increased truck traffic would cause "high" or "major" residual social impacts for residential communities on both roads. It recommended a corridor study be carried out on Millers Road to determine traffic management works, considering the safety, accessibility and amenity of the abutting local residential communities; it also recommended an air quality mitigation response be developed for both Millers Road and Williamstown Road.

The IAC urged more work to be done to develop a solution to manage growth in truck traffic between the Brooklyn/Tottenham industrial area and the port. It added: "Planning should be commenced to determine an alternate freight route to reduce reliance on Millers Road beyond 2031."

==== Ministerial assessment ====
The Minister for Planning, Richard Wynne released an Assessment Report of the West Gate Tunnel Project, concluding the Environment Effects Statement process, on 27 November 2017. He acknowledged that the project would generate both positive and negative environmental effects, but that adverse effects could be managed and minimised. He noted: "Regardless of the overall benefits, some local communities, particularly the residential communities near Millers and Williamstown Roads and Hyde Street, will suffer adverse effects" and recommended a corridor study for Millers Road to seek ways to reduce impacts to acceptable levels.

=== Millers Road/Williamstown Road Corridor Study ===
The Victorian Government announced in May 2018 that a Corridor Study Group would investigate safety and other issues in and near Millers Road and Williamstown Road in line with recommendations from the EES process. The group met several times from September 2018 but was criticised by the Save Willy Road residents' action group as a "sham," with claims it had been "hijacked" by VicRoads to make it easier for freight trucks to use Williamstown Road, while failing to address concerns about safety and amenity. The Corridor Study Group was terminated in January 2020 without producing any recommendations on mitigation strategies. In June 2021 the Victorian Ombudsman confirmed she was pursuing complaints about the study, with the state government refusing to release a final report from the process.

== Construction ==
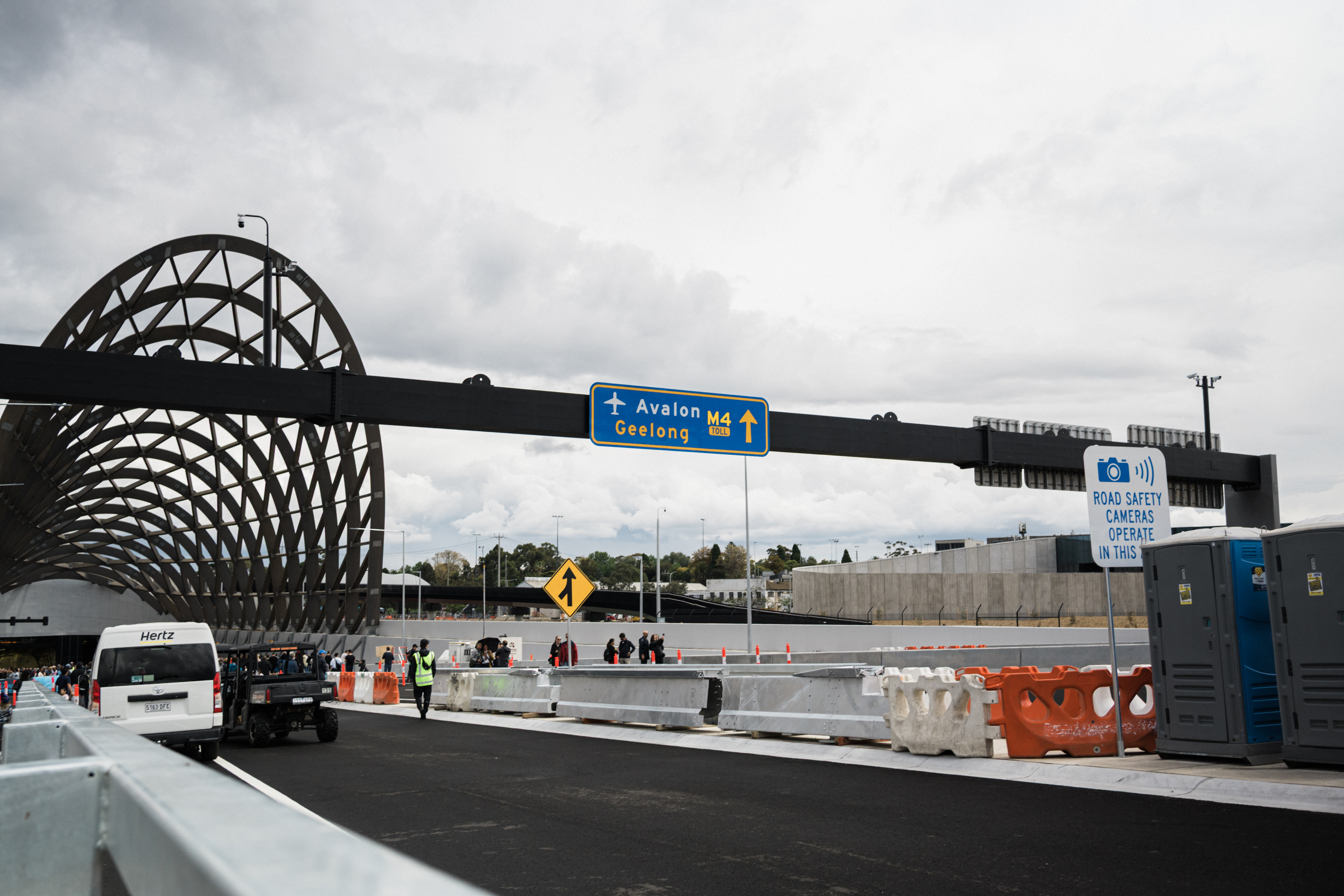
Tunnel entrance during a community day on 16 November 2025.

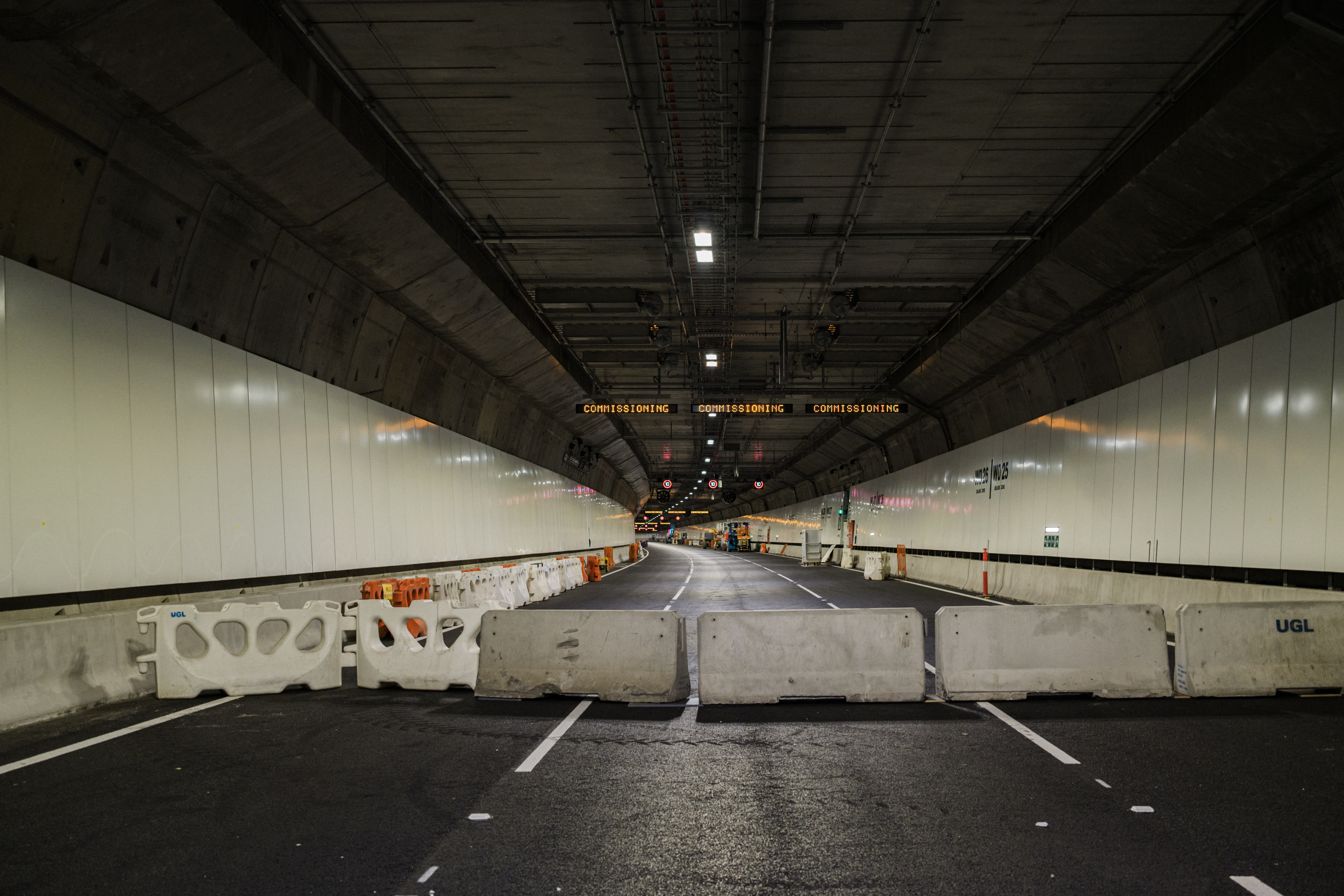
Inside the tunnel during a community day on 16 November 2025.

Preparatory work on the project began in early 2018 with the diversion of a 600-metre section of the brick North Yarra Main Sewer under Whitehall Street; that work finished in September 2019. Lane widening work on the West Gate Freeway began in February 2018 and work began in 2019 for the foundations of a new bridge over the Maribyrnong River and the elevated section of road on Footscray Road. A cut and cover method was chosen for the entry and exit of each of the two tunnels and the first of two 450-tonne tunnel boring machines was lowered into a launch site at the northern portal in Yarraville in August 2019. Tunnelling work was to begin first on the 4 km outbound tunnel, with work on the 2.8 km inbound tunnel to follow soon after, although soil contamination issues meant that by February 2020 boring work was yet to begin. The longer tunnel was expected to take about 18 months to bore, with 1.5 million cubic metres of rock and soil needing disposal at landfill sites.

=== Contaminated soil ===
The presence of contaminated soil from past industrial use in the project area and its impact was raised during the EES hearings and final Inquiry and Advisory Committee report. In mid-2019 the joint venture responsible for building the project—CPB Contractors and John Holland—reportedly sent Transurban a letter of intent, claiming they were confronted with a force majeure event, an unforeseeable circumstance that made it impossible to fulfil the terms of their contract, because of difficulties in disposing of soil contaminated with PFAS. They claimed the volume of contaminated soil was greater than expected, and that the rules of how to dispose of it had become stricter since work had begun. They demanded Transurban cover the additional costs of dealing with it—a figure reported to be between $500 million and $1 billion. In late January 2020 the companies claimed that because the issue had not been solved within six months, they planned to terminate the contract. As the dispute escalated, it was predicted that tunnelling machines could sit idle for six more months, casting doubt on whether the project can be delivered by its 2022 deadline, and 140 tunnel workers were laid off. By mid-May 2020 it was reported that hundreds more workers, including white-collar staff, were being laid off as delays continued. Soil samples taken near Mackenzie Road in Footscray, where the tunnel's road ramps are to go, reportedly showed contamination between 112 and 2,000 times the acceptable level in drinking water. Fears were held contaminants could leach into the water table.

Premier Daniel Andrews accused Transurban and its contractors of playing "silly games" to extract more taxpayer funds and threatened to revisit the lucrative 10-year CityLink tolling extension for Transurban. Transport Infrastructure Minister Jacinta Allan said the companies needed to resolve the situation without government involvement and said the presence of contaminated soil was known before the contract was signed. As the dispute continued, John Holland chief executive Joe Barr warned the construction industry was "teetering on the edge of collapse" because major contractors were not making money. Barr said his company would no longer bid on projects where it believed the risk profile was unacceptable, adding: "Risks that are controlled by governments should be held by governments." John Holland reported a $59.6 million loss while its contract partner CIMIC reported a $1 billion annual loss a month earlier.

Relationships between the contract partners descended to a new low in June 2020 when Transurban sought a Supreme Court injunction to stop what it claimed was a premature attempt by the tunnel builders to start arbitration over contaminated soil. Court documents also revealed that in March, Transurban had written to the state government questioning whether it could it tear up its contract with the government for the entire project if the builders' force majeure claim was deemed valid and their contract with Transurban was terminated. The state government responded that no force majeure event had occurred and Transurban was not entitled to quit the project.

Concerns over the possible disposal site of the contaminated soil sparked protests in Bacchus Marsh and Werribee in early 2020 but industry sources claimed much technical and planning work would be required before dump locations were finalised and it might be six months before they could receive waste. In September the Victorian Environment Protection Authority approved plans to send most of the PFAS-contaminated soil to two landfills—Maddingley brown coal landfill site in Bacchus Marsh and Hi-Quality in Bulla, northwest of Melbourne, a move that would exceed Victoria's landfill capacity and force landfill expansions. The state government was reported to have agreed to cover the additional cost of disposing of the toxic soil—now estimated to be as much as $750 million. The announcement sparked anger from residents and farmers near the dump sites, complaining soil would be dumped close to a school, homes and farms and Melton Council and the Moorabool Environment Group launched Supreme Court action in February 2021 to halt the plans.

In December 2020, however, EPA Victoria announced it had revoked all the landfill approvals it had given, admitting it had overstepped its powers by failing to wait for key information it had requested about the landfills before approving their environment management plans. EPA said it was a "technical administrative error" and each of the landfills would need to submit new applications for approval. The state opposition described the move as a "monumental stuff-up". All three were ultimately approved by the Planning Minister in March and April 2021 and the Hi-Quality site was selected by the project managers in June 2021 to accept the contaminated soil. Hume council in November 2021 said it would proceed with its Supreme Court challenge to review the ministerial approval of the Hi-Quality site, despite similar action initiated by Melton and Moorabool councils having been dismissed.

Transurban conceded in February 2021 that difficulties in securing soil disposal sites as well as lags in approvals and preparatory works meant a 2023 completion date for the project was no longer achievable. Company chief executive Scott Charlton said he could not confirm when the road would open. He said the project was also facing "substantial overruns" in costs. The state government eventually reached a deal in December 2021 with builders to end the construction stand-off, saying the deal would see Transurban contribute an extra $2.2 billion towards costs, while CPB John Holland would give up all of its profit margin and make significant losses, but would cost Victorian taxpayers an extra $1.9 billion and further delay the completion date into 2025.

After a damning report by the Victorian Ombudsman in May 2022, the Environment Protection Authority acknowledged it had failed to engage in a meaningful way with the community during the process of selecting a site for contaminated tunnel spoil. EPA Victoria's chief executive accepted that EPA should have done better at the time and said the organisation had since implemented proper processes for such projects.

=== Precast concrete ===
The West Gate Tunnel Project announced in 2018 that a new $60 million precast concrete facility would be built in Benalla to provide more than 65,000 concrete products for the project. The facility would include a new 700 metre rail siding and 600 metres of new rail track connecting it to the nearby freight line so the concrete segments could be loaded directly on to freight trains and transported to Melbourne. In August 2020 it was revealed about 460 of the concrete components, weighing up to 160 tonnes, would be too big for the railway tracks and would instead need to be trucked to Melbourne via 52-metre long, five-metre high "superload" freight vehicles travelling at 25 km/h. Residents in towns on the route, including Longwood and Locksley complained after they were warned to expect as many as five loads a week for two years, travelling at night. A month later Strathbogie Shire Council effectively banned the movement of the superloads on its roads by imposing a 70-tonne limit on the roads the West Gate Tunnel Project had planned as part of its route to Melbourne. Strathbogie Shire Mayor Amanda McClaren said the council wanted a Memorandum of Understanding with the project before it would allow the superloads to pass through. She said she wanted agreements for maintenance of the roads along with more details on when and how often the trucks would arrive.

== Auditor-General's analysis ==
A report by the Victorian Auditor-General's Office on the operation of market-led proposals tabled in November 2019 criticised the West Gate Tunnel project, which at that time it valued at $6.7 billion, concluding the government had approved the new tunnel without sufficient proof that Transurban's market-led proposal demonstrated value for money and "unique qualities". The report said Treasury Department officials failed to warn the government that extending CityLink tolling could "create an unintended monopoly advantage for Transurban". It said Treasury officials also failed to properly consider a range of alternative project options, or other ways–apart from extending Transurban's tolling on CityLink–to pay for the new road. "The business case was not sufficiently comprehensive and so undermined one of its key purposes–to provide confidence to decision-makers that they are selecting the right investment option," the audit said.

Auditor-General Andrew Greaves argued funds to build the road could have been raised through other means. The state government could have increased taxes, borrowed the money, taken control of CityLink tolling, or opened it up to competitive tender, he said. The report said including the Monash Freeway upgrade "lacked a convincing rationale" and coupled with a series of other abnormal additions might have inflated the project's benefits on paper. That meant the government "could not be assured that benefits had not been overstated", Mr Greaves said.

Pallas rejected the Auditor-General's findings, describing the report as "subjective opinion". "It is illogical, incoherent and in many places impossible to implement," he said.

== Criticism ==
The project has been criticised by transport and urban planning experts, for overstating the benefits, increasing traffic in the inner city, and not considering better alternatives. They have also criticised the lack of transparency in the planning process, and the lack of independent and democratic review. In December 2017 the Coalition and the Greens vowed to block the project.

Official projections for a significant increase in truck traffic on Millers Road and Williamstown Road once the tunnel opens led to the formation of two resident action groups, Don't Destroy Millers Road and Save Willy Road, which have expressed concerns about further degradation of air quality and called for freight truck bans on those roads. Maribyrnong City Council voted in July 2019 to advocate for truck bans on Williamstown Road and urged the state government to begin design and development of an alternative north–south freight route outside of residential areas.

In December 2017, the University of Melbourne and the Royal Melbourne Institute of Technology's Centre for Urban Research released a report, West Gate Tunnel: Another Case of Tunnel Vision, criticising the Andrews Government for proceeding with the West Gate Tunnel and the North East Link, claiming "secrecy" around traffic modelling raised doubts over the accuracy of the project's predictions and assumptions. It claimed the project could hinder public transport usage and accessibility and also asserted that it would do nothing to improve the east–west capacity of the M1 corridor because the "pinch point" of the CityLink tunnels would remain its main determinant. The report was accompanied by an open letter to Andrews and all Victorian MPs signed by 28 academics asking the government to reconsider building the tunnel project because of concerns about an inability to meet its objectives; project overreach and overstatement of benefits; the adequacy of planning processes and planning strategies; and the opacity of the market-led process.

In evidence to a 2017 senate committee hearing on the operations of toll roads, transport planner William McDougall gave evidence that in 2015 he was contracted by the Victorian government to support an externally-appointed peer reviewer for the tunnel project's transport modelling and to undertake a peer review of its cost-benefit analysis. He became convinced both the transport modelling and cost-benefit analysis were flawed and would not stand up to scrutiny. After raising concerns with state Treasurer Tim Pallas he was taken off the project's work. His submission to the senate committee claimed the transport modelling had been "fudged" and the cost-benefit analysis overstated the project's benefits. He wrote that the work for the project was "biased towards producing bullish forecasts and optimistic and financial projections ... my direct experience as a reviewer confirmed my long-held suspicions of substantial 'optimism bias' in the appraisal process".

In addition, some argue that the West Gate Tunnel may not provide a genuine alternative as an east-west route, potentially exacerbating existing traffic issues on the congested West Gate Freeway section between the Western Ring Road and West Gate Bridge. Proponents of the cancelled East West Link suggest that it could have better alleviated pressure on the congested West Gate Freeway corridor by introducing an entirely separate inner-city bypass segment from the Western Ring Road to the Tullamarine Freeway. Additionally, concerns persist about the project's lack of benefits for motorists in Melbourne's eastern suburbs, who continue to experience traffic congestion at the city end of the Eastern Freeway. This congestion may be further exacerbated by the completion of the North East Link.

== Exits and interchanges ==
LGA	Location	km	mi	Exit (Note: As signposted)	Destinations	Notes
Hobsons Bay–Maribyrnong boundary	Yarraville–Altona North boundary	0.0	0.0		West Gate Freeway (M1) – Werribee, Geelong, Avalon Airport	Western terminus of westbound tollway and tunnel portal, continues west as West Gate Freeway; Westbound exit only
Hobsons Bay–Maribyrnong boundary	Yarraville–Spotswood boundary	1.4	0.87		West Gate Freeway (M1) – Werribee, Geelong, Avalon Airport	Western terminus of eastbound tollway and tunnel portal, continued west from West Gate Freeway; Eastbound entrance only
Maribyrnong	Footscray	4.5	2.8	Eastern terminus of tunnel portal Toll Point (for light vehicles only)		
Maribyrnong	Footscray	4.8	3.0	4	MacKenzie Road – Footscray, Coode Island, Swanson Dock	Eastbound exit and westbound entrance only Access to Footscray Road including to / from Footscray
Maribyrnong River		5.0	3.1	Nangnak Barring Bridge		
Melbourne	West Melbourne	6.0	3.7		Footscray Road (Metro Route 32) – West Melbourne	Westbound entrance from Footscray Road westbound only
Melbourne	West Melbourne	6.7	4.2	3	Footscray Road (Metro Route 32 west, east) – Footscray, Swanson Dock; Appleton Dock Road (south) – Appleton Dock	Eastbound exit onto Footscray Road westbound and Appleton Dock Road only
Melbourne	West Melbourne	6.7	4.2	1	CityLink (M2) – Tullamarine, Melbourne Airport	Eastbound exit onto CityLink northbound only Westbound entrance from CityLink southbound only
Melbourne	West Melbourne	7.0	4.3	Eastern terminus of tollway and freeway-standard conditions Eastbound Toll Point (for light vehicles only, AM peak)		
Melbourne	West Melbourne	7.5	4.7		Footscray Road (Metro Route 32) – Docklands	Traffic lights Eastbound exit onto Footscray Road eastbound only Westbound entrance from Footscray Road westbound only
Melbourne	West Melbourne	7.9	4.9		Wurundjeri Way – Docklands, City	Traffic lights Eastbound exit onto Wurundjeri Way southbound only Westbound entrance from Wurundjeri Way northbound only
Melbourne	West Melbourne	8.0	5.0		Dynon Road (Metro Route 50) – North Melbourne, City	Traffic lights Eastbound exit onto Dynon Road eastbound only Westbound entrance from Dynon Road westbound only
1.000 mi = 1.609 km; 1.000 km = 0.621 mi: Incomplete access; Tolled; Route transition

== Tolls ==
Light vehicles (cars, motorcycles and light commercial vehicles) using the tunnel are tolled within the tunnel. An additional AM peak-only toll is also charged on eastbound light vehicles exiting onto the tunnel's connector roads to Footscray Road, Dynon Road and Wurundjeri Way at the city-end (the "AM peak city exit" toll point).

Heavy commercial vehicles using the tunnel are instead tolled on the West Gate Freeway, located west of the tunnel portal between Millers Road and Williamstown Road. These tolls also automatically cover the use of the tunnel and the city-end connector roads without incurring additional tolls.

As part of the tunnel opening, there was a temporary toll-free period for all toll points on weekends during January 2026.

Toll prices as of 1 July 2025
Toll road	Toll section or toll points	Maximum toll price per trip					Toll increase	Toll concessionaire	Expiry of toll concession
Toll road	Toll section or toll points	Cars	Motorcycles	Light Commercial Vehicles	Heavy Commercial Vehicles	Long Heavy Commercial Vehicles	Toll increase	Toll concessionaire	Expiry of toll concession
West Gate Freeway	Between Millers Road and Williamstown Road	No toll			$19.78 (Note: Price shown is the daytime price. Nighttime price is $13.19.)	$29.67 (Note: Price shown is the daytime price. Nighttime price is $19.78.)	Quarterly on 1 January, 1 April, 1 July, and 1 October by 1.04597% (Note: These are equivalent to fixed increases of 4.25% annually and are only until 30 June 2029. From 1 July 2029, quarterly increases will be determined by CPI)	Transurban	13 January 2045
West Gate Freeway	Hyde Street ramps	$4.09	$2.05	$6.54	No additional tolls, toll already covered by West Gate Freeway toll charges		Quarterly on 1 January, 1 April, 1 July, and 1 October by 1.04597%	Transurban	13 January 2045
West Gate Tunnel	Within tunnel	$4.09	$2.05	$6.54	No additional tolls, toll already covered by West Gate Freeway toll charges		Quarterly on 1 January, 1 April, 1 July, and 1 October by 1.04597%	Transurban	13 January 2045
West Gate Tunnel	City exit to Footscray Road, Dynon Road and Wurundjeri Way (eastbound only and AM peak (Note: AM peak period is 7am–9am weekdays, excluding public holidays) only)	$6.54	$3.27	$10.47	No additional tolls, toll already covered by West Gate Freeway toll charges		Quarterly on 1 January, 1 April, 1 July, and 1 October by 1.04597%	Transurban	13 January 2045
Combined West Gate (Note: The heavy vehicle toll point on the West Gate Freeway covers the freeway and the West Gate Tunnel) & CityLink trip	Combined Heavy Vehicle Trip Cap	N/A			$36.81 (Note: Price shown is the daytime price. Nighttime price is $24.54.)	$55.22 (Note: Price shown is the daytime price. Nighttime price is $36.81.)	Quarterly on 1 January, 1 April, 1 July, and 1 October by 1.04597%	Transurban	13 January 2045

== See also ==
- West Gate Distributor
- East West Link
- List of tunnels in Australia
