= Seafarers Bridge =

Footbridge across the Yarra River in Melbourne, Australia

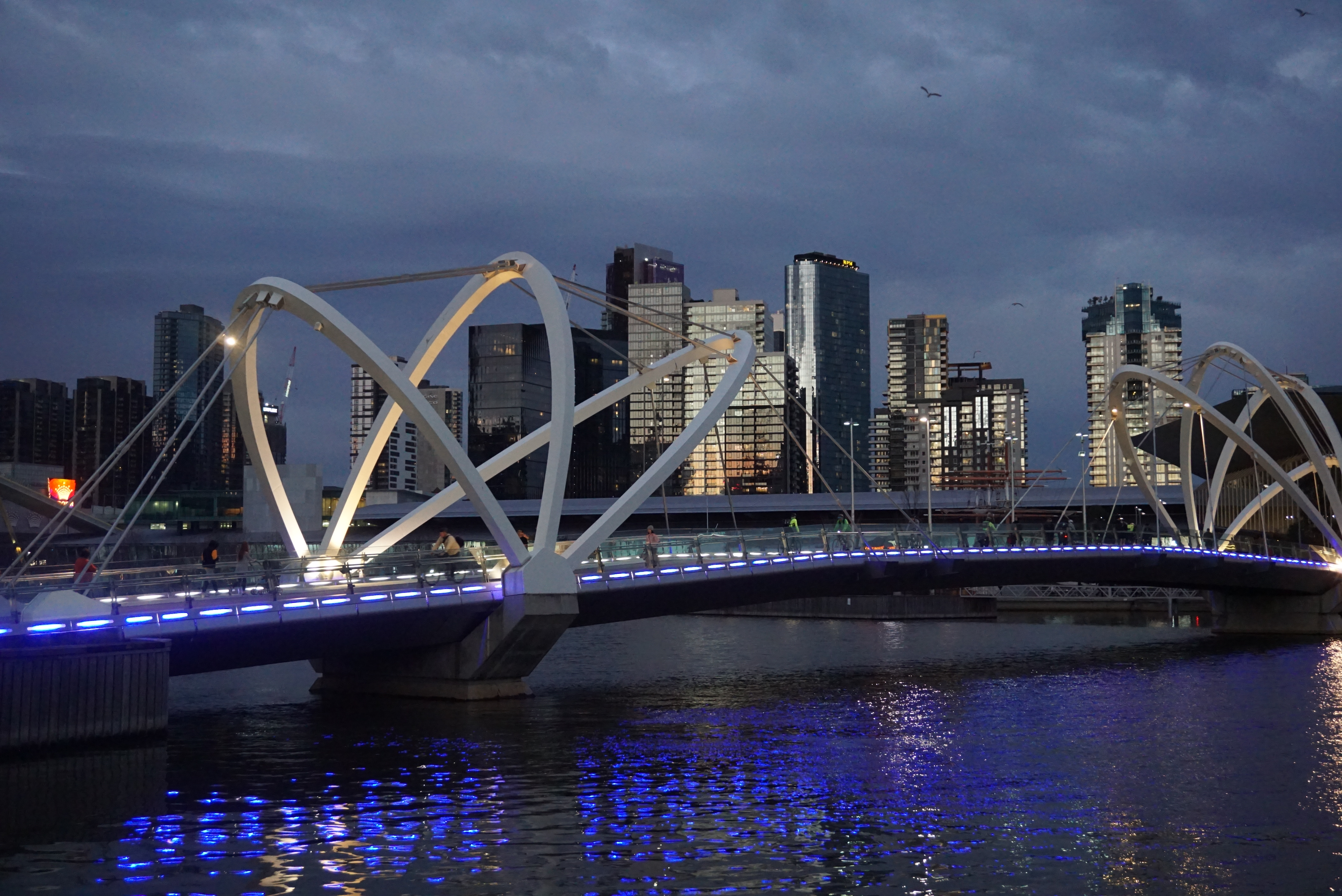
- The bridge at night
- Coordinates: 37°49′25″S 144°57′07″E
- Carries: Pedestrians; cyclists
- Crosses: Yarra River
- Locale: Melbourne, Victoria, Australia
- Begins: Melbourne city centre
- Ends: Docklands / South Wharf
- Maintained by: City of Melbourne
- Preceded by: Clarendon Street Bridge
- Followed by: Charles Grimes Bridge

Characteristics
- Design: Cable-stayed bridge
- Material: Steel
- Total length: 75 m (246 ft)
- No. of spans: 1

History
- Architect: Grimshaw Architects
- Engineering design by: Brown Consulting
- Constructed by: Fitzgerald Constructions
- Opened: January 2009; 17 years ago

Location
- Interactive map of Seafarers Bridge

The Seafarers Bridge is a cable-stayed footbridge across the Yarra River, located in the city centre of Melbourne, in Victoria, Australia. The bridge links to city centre with Docklands and South Wharf.

The single-span two-pylon cable-stayed bridge connects the north and south banks of the river while providing a formal entrance to the Melbourne Convention & Exhibition Centre. The bridge main span is supported by steel ties connected to elliptical arches, with three arches on the north side and four arches on the south side.

The bridge was named in homage to the ‘Mission to Seafarers’ centre located nearby on the northern bank of the Yarra River and to represent Melbourne's rich maritime history.

== See also ==
- Crossings of the Yarra River

Next bridge upstream	Yarra River	Next bridge downstream
Clarendon Street Bridge (trams; vehicles; pedestrians; cyclists)	Seafarers Bridge	Charles Grimes Bridge (vehicles only)
