= Wurundjeri Way =

Road in Melbourne, Victoria

Wurundjeri Way Docklands Highway Victoria
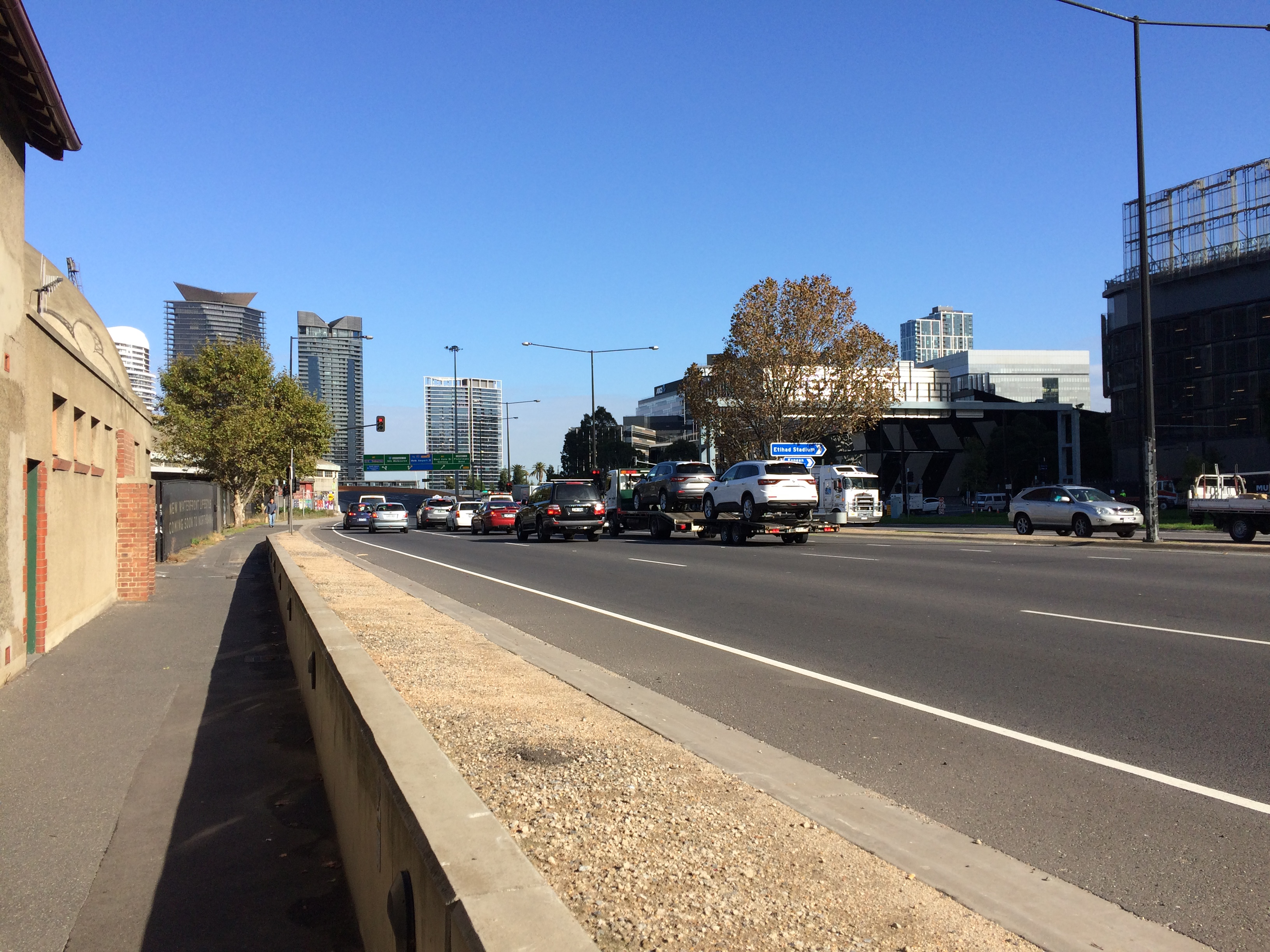
- Wurundjeri Way in Docklands
- Coordinates: 37.804112°S 144.933804°E (North end); 37.826270°S 144.947347°E (South end)

General information
- Type: Road
- Length: 3.3 km (2.1 mi)
- Opened: 1999-2025
- Route number(s): Metro Route 55 (2005–present) (through Docklands); Metro Route 30 (1999–present) (Flinders Street-Lorimer Street)
- Former route number: National Highway 31 (1999–2005) (through Docklands)
- Tourist routes: Tourist Route 2 (1999–present) (Flinders Street-Lorimer Street)

Major junctions
- North end: Dynon Road; West Melbourne
- West Gate Tunnel; Dudley Street; Bourke Street; Flinders Street; Lorimer Street
- South end: Montague Street; Docklands, Melbourne

Location(s)
- Major suburbs: Docklands, West Melbourne

Wurundjeri Way is a 3.3-kilometre (2.1 mi) road running through the Docklands Development west of the Melbourne central business district, Victoria, Australia. It was constructed in 1999 as part of replanning and development of the former Melbourne rail yards and docks, and extended in 2025. The southern section is gazetted as part of Docklands Highway.

== Route ==
Wurundjeri Way commences at the intersection with Dynon Road in West Melbourne, and curves up and over Dynon Road to run south over the South Dynon railway yards as a four-lane, dual-carriage road, intersecting nearly immediately with the West Gate Tunnel, continuing south over Dudley Street, alongside the eastern border of Melbourne's Docklands precinct. It curves west after intersecting with Flinders Street, then south again over the Yarra River via the Charles Grimes Bridge, to eventually terminate at the intersection with Lorimer and Montague Streets in the southern borders of Docklands.

== History ==
When the Melbourne Docklands were redeveloped in the 1990s, Footscray Road - as the main north-south arterial road through the precinct - was closed as a through route and rebuilt as Harbour Esplanade. To replace the through route, Wurundjeri Way was constructed to the east. To connect to this new road Flinders Street was upgraded, and the north end of the Charles Grimes Bridge was rebuilt on a curve to connect to it. Reconstruction started in June 1999, and was completed by 2001.

A feature of the road, and integral to its design and naming, is the gigantic statue of Bunjil the eagle, by Melbourne sculptor Bruce Armstrong which was constructed in the median at the south end of the road. Proposals to develop this area for new buildings including the air rights over Wurundjeri Way, may require the statue to be moved.

Metropolitan Route 30 was extended west from Flinders Street along Wurundjeri Way and across the Charles Grimes Bridge on its opening in 1999. National Highway 31 was re-aligned to run along Wurundjeri Way in 1999; this was replaced by Metropolitan Route 55 in 2005.

The passing of the Transport Act 1983 (itself an evolution from the original Highways and Vehicles Act 1924) provided for the declaration of State Highways, roads two-thirds financed by the state government through the Road Construction Authority (later VicRoads). Docklands Highway was declared along Footscray Road, across the Yarra River over the Charles Grimes Bridge to end at the interchange of Montague Street with West Gate Freeway in September 1994, later re-aligned along Wurundjeri Way when it opened between Dudley Street and the Yarra River in 1999; the road is still presently known (and signposted) as Wurundjeri Way along its gazetted section.

The passing of the Road Management Act 2004 granted the responsibility of overall management and development of Victoria's major arterial roads to VicRoads: in 2004, VicRoads declared the road as part of Docklands Highway (Arterial #6120), from Dudley Street to Montague Street in Docklands.

In October 2025, the road was extended by 1.5 kilometres (0.93 mi) as part of the West Gate Tunnel Project, with new intersections connecting to the West Gate Tunnel and Dynon Road. In the northbound direction, the extension begins as an exit from the existing road, leading into a bridge over the Dudley Street junction. In the southbound direction, the extension similarly bypasses Dudley Street using a bridge, then merges into the existing road south of the intersection, near the entry to Docklands Stadium.

== Major intersections ==
Wurundjeri Way is entirely contained within the City of Melbourne local government area.

| Location | km | mi | Destinations | Notes |
|---|---|---|---|---|
| West Melbourne | 0.0 | 0.0 | Dynon Road (Metro Route 50) – Footscray | No left turn eastbound into, and no right turn westbound from, Dynon Road; Northern terminus of road |
| West Melbourne | 0.5 | 0.31 | West Gate Tunnel (M4) – Geelong, Ballarat, Avalon Airport | Left turn northbound into, and right turn eastbound from, West Gate Tunnel only |
| Docklands | 1.4 | 0.87 | Dudley Street (Metro Routes 32 west, east/Metro Route 55 east) – Docklands, City | Left and right turns into Dudley Street from northbound only; southbound carriageway flies over without intersecting Metro Route 55 continues east along Dudley Street, south along Wurundjeri Way; Wurundjeri Way continues without a route number northbound |
| Docklands | 2.2 | 1.4 | Bourke Street – Docklands, Docklands Stadium | |
| Docklands | 2.7 | 1.7 | Flinders Street (Metro Route 30/Tourist Route 2 east) – City; Aurora Lane (north) – Docklands | Northern terminus of concurrency with Metro Route 30 and Tourist Route 2 Aurora Lane northbound exit only |
| Yarra River | 2.9– 3.2 | 1.8– 2.0 | Charles Grimes Bridge | |
| Docklands | 3.2 | 2.0 | Harbour Esplanade (north) – Docklands | Northbound exit only |
| Docklands | 3.3 | 2.1 | Lorimer Street (west) – Fishermans Bend; Convention Centre Place (east) – Melbourne Convention and Exhibition Centre | |
| Docklands | 3.3 | 2.1 | Montague Street (Metro Routes 30/55/Tourist Route 2) – South Melbourne | Southern terminus of road, Metro Routes 30/55 and Tourist Route 2 continue south along Montague Street; Southern terminus of concurrency with Metro Route 30 and Tourist Route 2 |
1.000 mi = 1.609 km; 1.000 km = 0.621 mi: Concurrency terminus; Incomplete access; Route transition
