= Distributor (disambiguation) =

A distributor is part of the ignition system of an internal combustion engine.

Distributor may also refer to:

- Any person or company engaged in distribution (marketing)
  - Film distributor
  - Record distributor
- Distributor (category theory) in category theory, also known as a profunctor
- Distributor road, a road which serves to move traffic from local streets to arterial roads
  - Eastern Distributor, freeway in Sydney, Australia
  - Western Distributor (Sydney), freeway in Sydney, Australia
- Distributor (HBC vessel), built 1924

== See also ==
- Western Distributor (disambiguation)
- Distribution (disambiguation)
