= Distribution =

Distribution may refer to:

== Mathematics ==
- Distribution (mathematical analysis), generalized function used to formulate solutions of partial differential equations
- Distribution (number theory), its algebraic analogue
- Distribution (differential geometry), a subset of the tangent bundle of a manifold
- Probability distribution, the probability of a particular value or value range of a variable
  - Cumulative distribution function, in which the probability of being no greater than a particular value is a function of that value
- Frequency distribution, a list of the values recorded in a sample
- Inner distribution, and outer distribution, in coding theory
- Distributed parameter system, systems that have an infinite-dimensional state-space
- Distribution of terms, a situation in which all members of a category are accounted for
- Distributivity, a property of binary operations that generalises the distributive law from elementary algebra
- Distribution problems, a common type of problems in combinatorics where the goal is to enumerate the number of possible distributions of m objects to n recipients, subject to various conditions; see Twelvefold way

== Computing and telecommunications ==
- Distribution (concurrency), the projection operator in a history monoid, a representation of the histories of concurrent computer processes
- Data distribution or dissemination, to distribute information without direct feedback
- Digital distribution, publishing media digitally
- Distributed computing, the coordinated use of physically distributed computers (distributed systems) for tasks or storage
- Electronic brakeforce distribution, an automotive technology that varies brake force based on prevailing conditions
- Key distribution center, part of a cryptosystem intended to reduce the risks inherent in exchanging keys
- Software distribution, bundles of a specific software already compiled and configured
  - A specific packaging of an operating system containing a kernel, toolchain, utilities and other software
    - Linux distribution, one of several distributions built on the Linux kernel

== Natural sciences ==
- Distribution (pharmacology), the movement of a drug from one location to another within the body
- Species distribution, the manner in which a species is spatially arranged
  - Cosmopolitan distribution, in which a species appears in appropriate environments around the world
- Spectral power distribution of light sources

== Economics ==
- Distribution (economics), distribution of income or output among individuals or factors of production (or to help others)
  - Distribution in kind, concerning the transfer of non-cash assets by a company to a shareholder, see Companies Act 2006
- Distribution (marketing), or place, one of the four elements of marketing mix
  - Distribution resource planning, method used in business administration for planning orders within a supply chain
- Distributionism, an economic ideology
- Distribution of wealth, among members in a society
- Division of property, or equitable distribution, of property between spouses during divorce
- Food distribution, methods of transporting food
- Drug distribution, methods by which medication goes from manufacturer to consumer

== Other sciences ==
- Electric power distribution, the final stage in the delivery of electricity
- Distributed generation, the use of technologies to provide electric power at the source of consumption
- Distributed production or distributed manufacturing, the fabrication of products by consumers such as with 3D printing
- Distribution of elements in the distributed-element model of electric circuits
- Trip distribution, part of the four-step transportation forecasting model
- The distribution of a linguistic element is the set of environments in which it occurs, which may be in complementary distribution, contrastive distribution, or free variation with another such element, and which is the basis of distributional semantics

== Other uses ==
- Film distribution, the process of making a movie available for the audiences to watch
- Film distributor, an agent between a film producer and an exhibitor
- Purse distribution, in a horse race, the distribution of winnings among the highest finishers
- Record distribution, process of shipping and promoting record labels
- Font distribution, the units in which metal type is sold, containing relative proportions of letters appropriate for a given language
- Distribution (bridge), a term in the bridge card game

== See also ==
- Apportionment, means distribution or allotment in proper shares
- Distributism, a political philosophy
- Distributor (disambiguation)
- Range (disambiguation)
