= Harbour Esplanade =

Street in Melbourne, Victoria, Australia

Harbour Esplanade Victoria
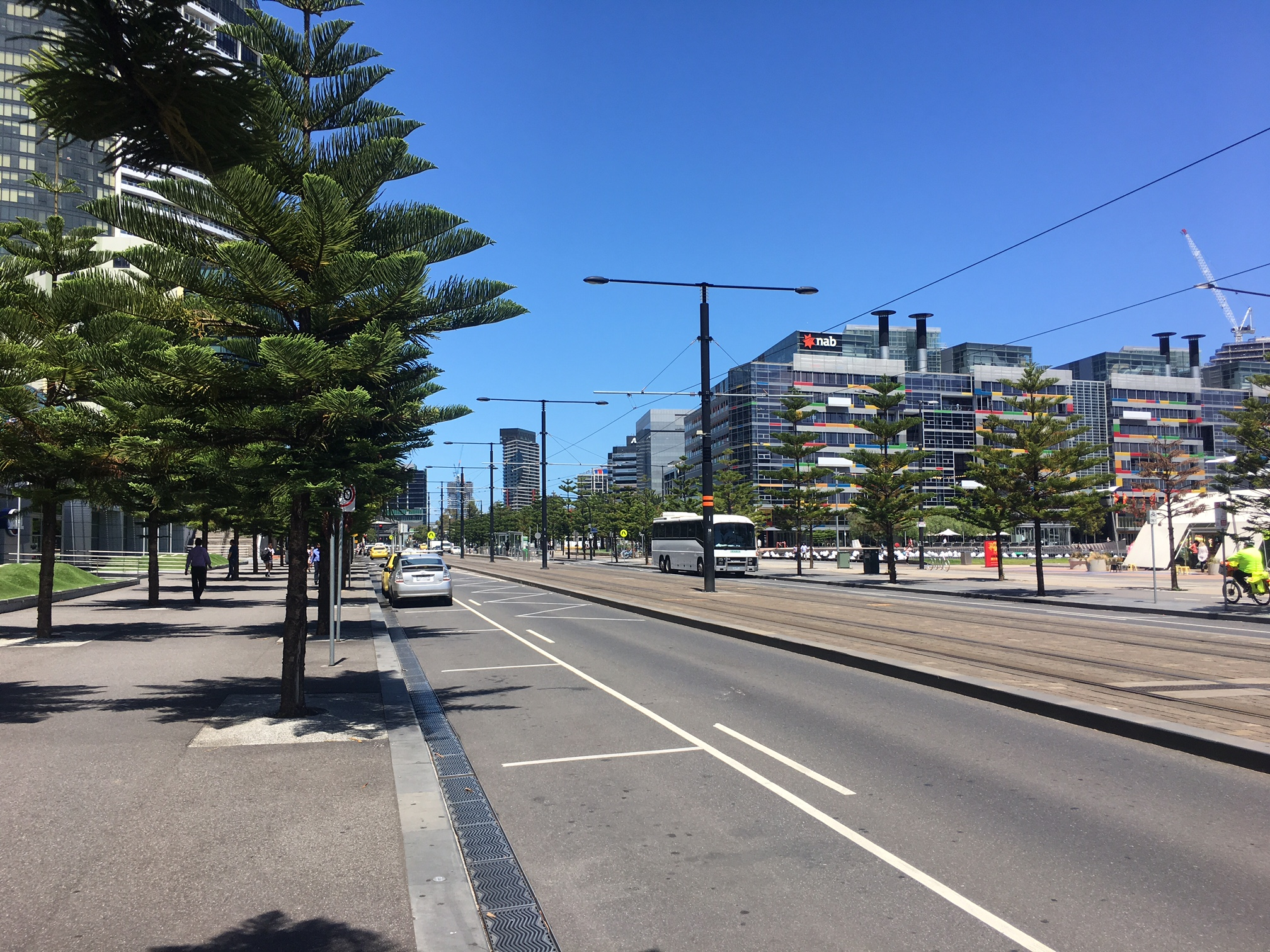
- Harbour Esplanade facing south opposite Victoria Dock, January 2017
- Coordinates: 37.817286°S 144.946053°E

General information
- Type: Street
- Length: 2.5 km (1.6 mi)
- Opened: 2007

Major junctions
- North end: Footscray Road; West Melbourne
- Dudley Street; Docklands Drive; La Trobe Street; Bourke Street; Collins Street
- South end: Navigation Drive; Docklands, Melbourne

Location(s)
- LGA(s): City of Melbourne
- Suburb(s): Docklands

Harbour Esplanade is a waterfront street and thoroughfare in Docklands, an inner suburb of Melbourne, Victoria, Australia. It runs roughly north–south from Navigation Drive in the south to Docklands Drive in the north. The road also forms the eastern boundary of the Victoria Harbour inlet and is adjacent to Victoria Dock.

The esplanade is a core element of the Docklands urban renewal precinct and is known for housing Docklands Stadium and several converted dock buildings that now serve as pubs and function spaces. Harbour Esplanade is also the location of office buildings and restaurants, whilst the Capital City Trail runs parallel along some of its length.

It has been described as Melbourne's waterfront boulevard and its future potential is compared to the successful Circular Quay in Sydney.

== History ==
Harbour Esplanade was previously known as Footscray Road - between Dudley Street and Pigott Street (now renamed Bourke Street) - and Charles Grimes Bridge Road, connecting West Melbourne through the Docklands precinct over the Yarra River to South Melbourne, without needing to go through central Melbourne. The road was dual-carriageway through a mainly freight and heavy industrial area that had fallen into dis-use by the mid-1980s. With the transformation of Harbour Esplanade as a dock-side boulevard, Wurundjeri Way was built as a replacement through route in 1999.

=== Creation ===
Docklands was first planned in 1997 as part of Ashton Raggatt McDougall (ARM)'s masterplan for the precinct by the Kennett government. The original plan envisaged Harbour Esplanade to be the focal point for the entire Docklands, with Central Pier to be demolished and replaced by a peninsula of islands featuring green space and a walking path from which the whole precinct could be viewed connected to the Esplanade via two footbridges. Around the former pier were clustered low-rise (maximimum 3 storey) mixed-use buildings aimed at activation and maximising pedestrian activity on the foreshore. Under the plan, pedestrians would be funnelled directly west toward Harbour Esplanade from Spencer Street via connections from Collins, Latrobe and Bourke Streets via a series of wide promenades. The foreshore would have been flanked by a large green open space with the Harbour Esplanade a relatively narrow tree lined road aimed at minimising any disconnection for pedestrians. In the ARM masterplan, low rise buildings set back from the esplanade instead of tall buildings and wind breaks were incorporated into the surrounding areas.

A new Bracks government redesigned it under the Docklands Public Realm Plan and a new planning committee. The new plan called for an ultra-wide thoroughfare to include multiple lanes and trams lined by Canary Island date palms similar to the popular foreshores of Port Melbourne and Albert Park. The foreshore pedestrian walkway would be limited to the area covered by the timber and concrete wharves. Central pier buildings to be restored and retained instead of demolished. The new plan removed mixed-use low-rise along Harbour Esplanade with the aim of maximising the width of the road area. Under the new masterplan tall towers were allowed to be clustered around the stadium and neighbouring precincts. Under the new plan, pedestrians would be funnelled north–south along the esplanade instead of from the CBD.

Harbour Esplanade was gazetted as part of the Docklands urban renewal project in 2007. Initially a somewhat disconnected street with minimal attractions and accessibility, the area is now the focus of further development and government grants to help improve the amenity of the Docklands area.

In response to criticisms regarding lack of green space, Norfolk Island Pine trees were planted along the length of the esplanade in 2011, in addition to the creation of dedicated bike lane and pedestrian pathway. Tram tracks were also realigned and the vision for Harbour Esplanade to connect the Yarra River to Victoria Harbour in a more complete way was realised.

Places Victoria has also funded the construction of Hortus, a glasshouse with an edible plant installation, café and outdoor environment to bring further life to the area.

==== Redevelopments (2010-) ====
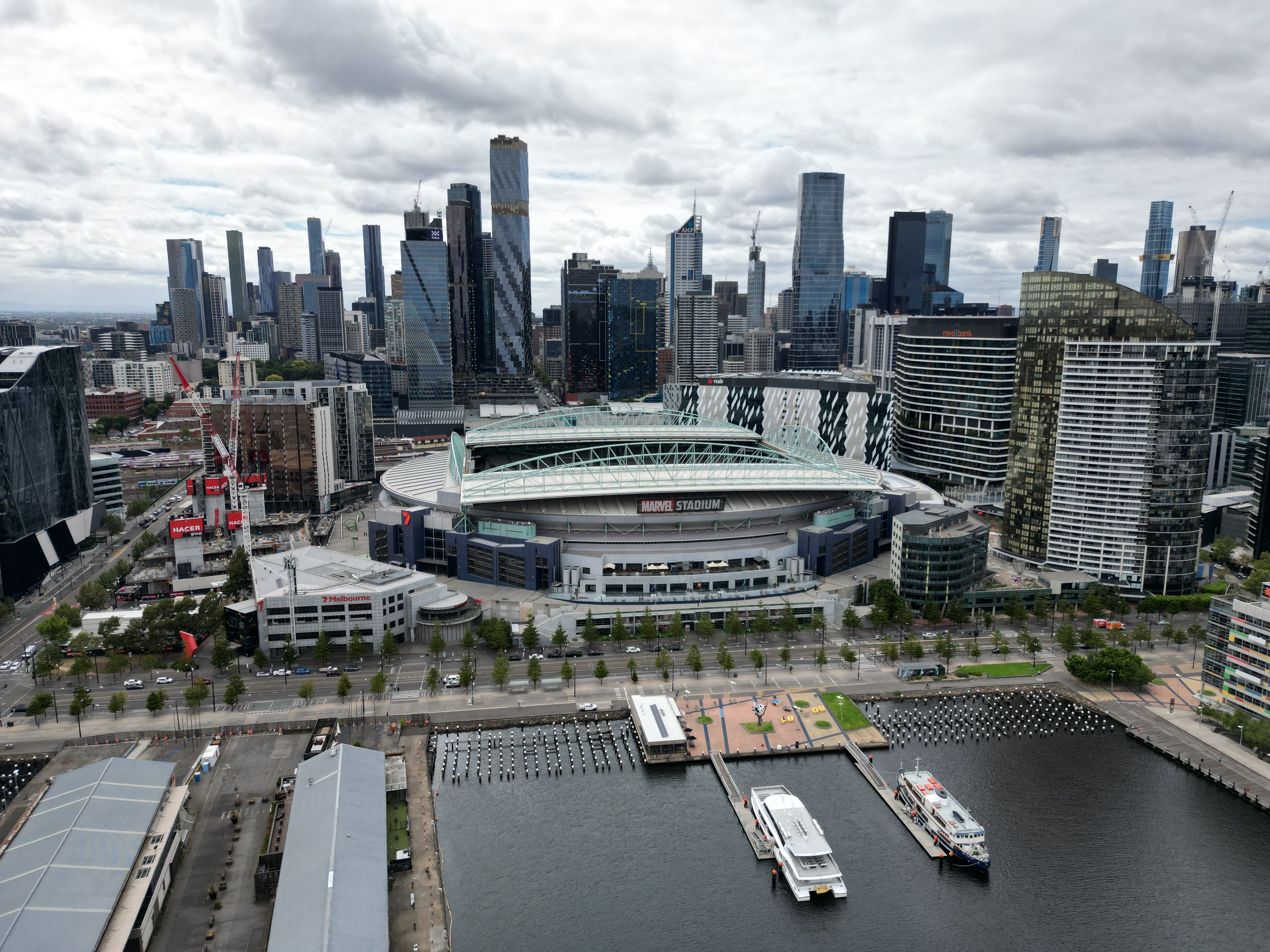
Aerial perspective of Marvel Stadium in 2023 showing new pine trees that replaced the palm trees along Harbour Esplanade and deteriorated wharves removed, and Central Pier shut down for demolition and rebuilding. Even after more than two decades a severe lack of activity along the esplanade is evident.

Due to concerns over the failed pedestrian activation of Harbour Esplanade, it was redeveloped between 2010 and 2011 at a cost of $9.2 million. The existing twenty-three 10-metre-tall (33 ft) palms and gum trees were replaced by 230 Norfolk Island pines, realigned tram tracks to the centre roadway and new separated bicycle paths added. However the redevelopment failed in its objective to increase pedestrian activation of the foreshore. As a result, another $16 million redevelopment under a new Harbour Esplanade Masterplan was proposed to repair the degraded wharfs unsuitable for pedestrian activation and reinstate previously demolished sheds and introduce an avenue trees to the waterfront. In 2020 the heritage listed Central Pier and its Shed 9 and Shed 19 were permanently closed due to its deteriorating condition. By 2023 the government decided to demolish and replace the heritage listed Central Pier which had been a centrepiece of the revised 1999 masterplan. The project would cost a total of $550 million. The shutdown was estimated to cost a further $865 million to the economy and was the subject of legal action against the government by commercial tenants.

== Major intersections ==
LGA	Location	km	mi	Destinations	Notes
		Footscray Road (Metro Route 32) – Footscray			
		Dudley Street (Metro Route 32) – West Melbourne; Docklands Drive – Docklands			
		La Trobe Street – Melbourne			
		Bourke Street – Docklands			
		Collins Street (Metro Routes 32) – Docklands, Melbourne			
		Navigation Drive – Docklands			

== Criticism ==
In 2010, Places Victoria's general manager David Young acknowledged that Harbour Esplanade "doesn't stack up". Kim Dovey, professor of architecture and design at the University of Melbourne stated that Harbour Esplanade was "too big" for the Docklands precinct. The Lord Mayor has also criticised initial planning for the esplanade, claiming it should have been the first thing considered when planning Docklands.

== Notable buildings ==
Several buildings and structures along Harbour Esplanade are listed on the Victorian Heritage Register and/or classified by the National Trust of Australia, including:

- Victoria Dock
- Alma Doepel
- Gasworks Superintendent's Residence

In addition, there are several newer landmarks:

- Docklands Park
- Docklands Stadium
- Comtechport
- National Australia Bank Headquarters

== Public art ==
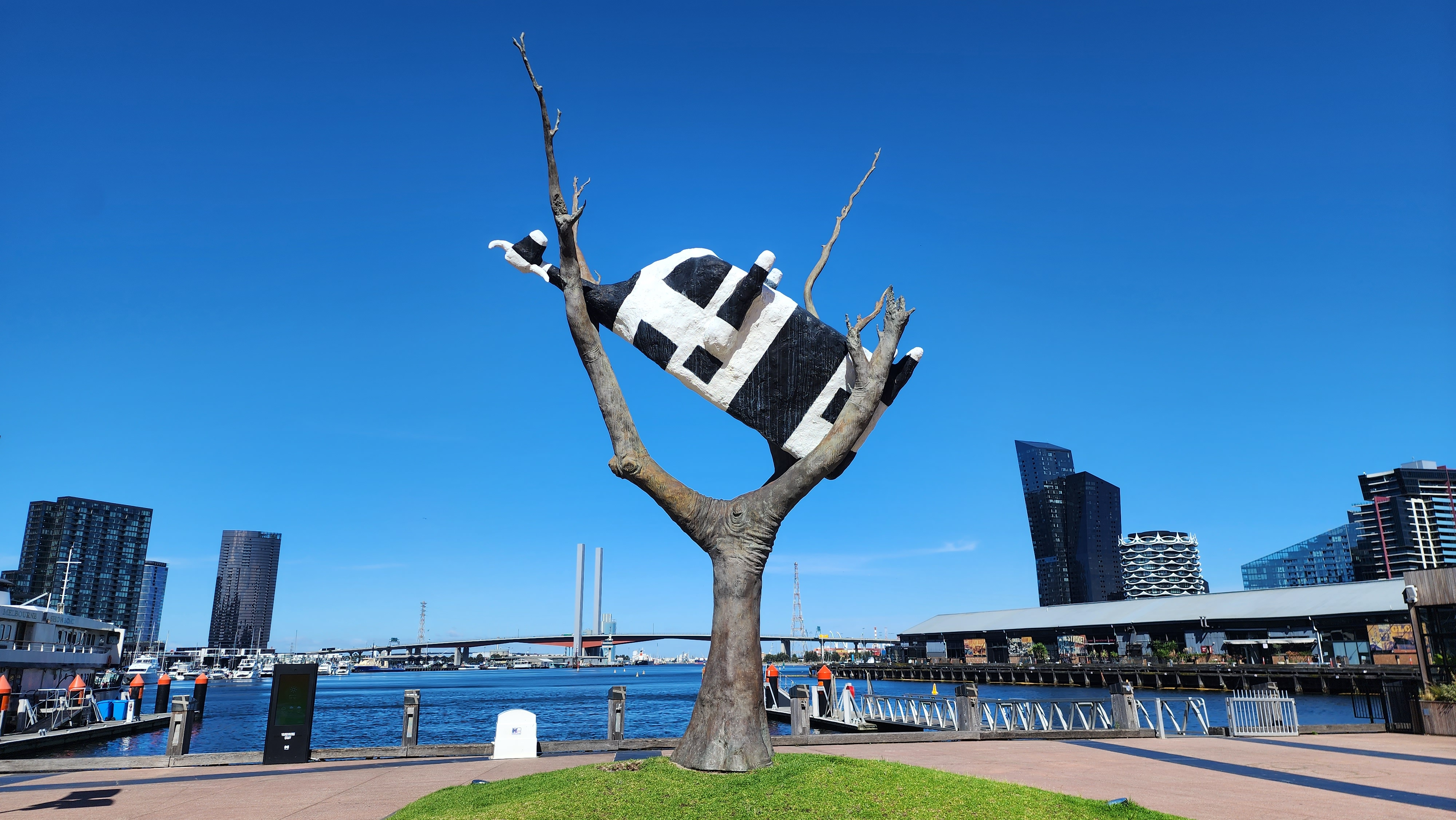
"Cow up a tree" by John Kelly

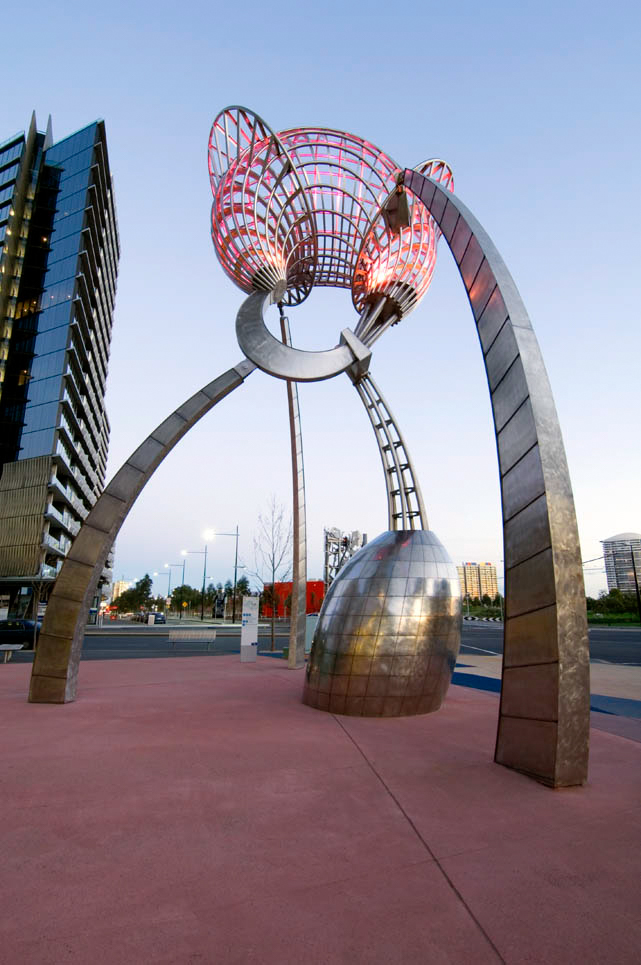
"Aurora" by Geoffrey Bartlett on the corner of Collins Street

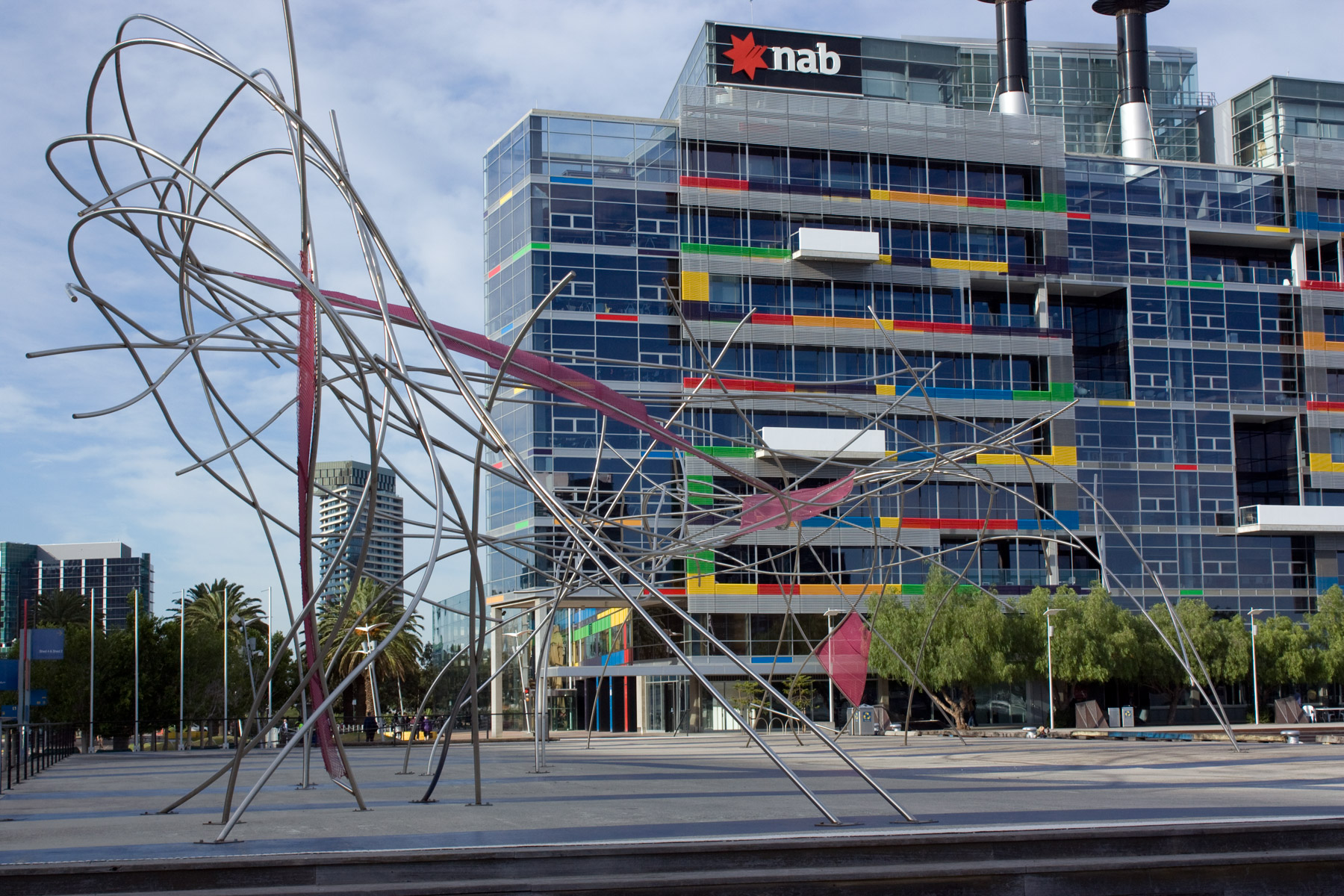
"Shoal Fly By" by Cat McLeod and Michael Bellemo.

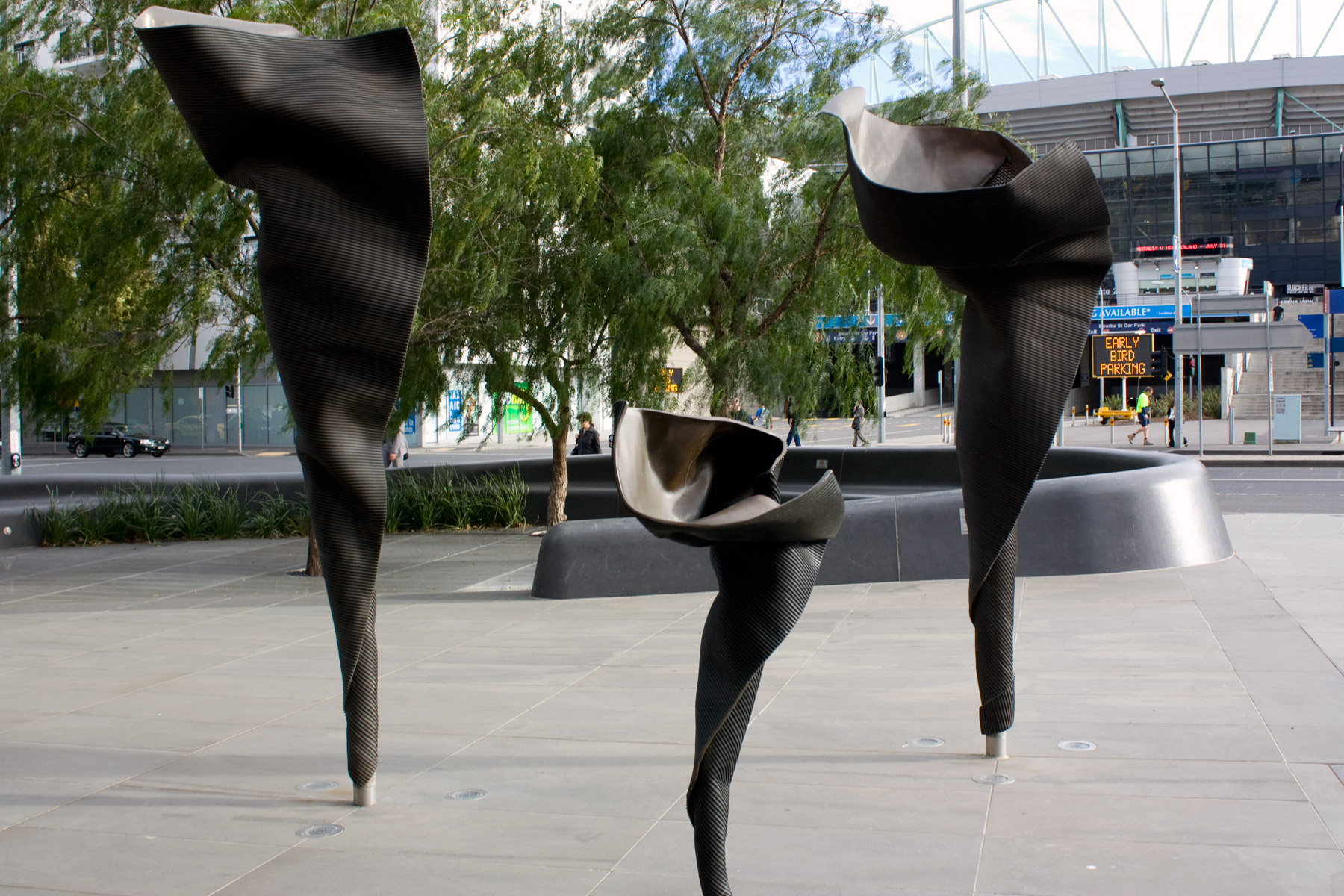
"Unfurling" by Andrew Rogers.

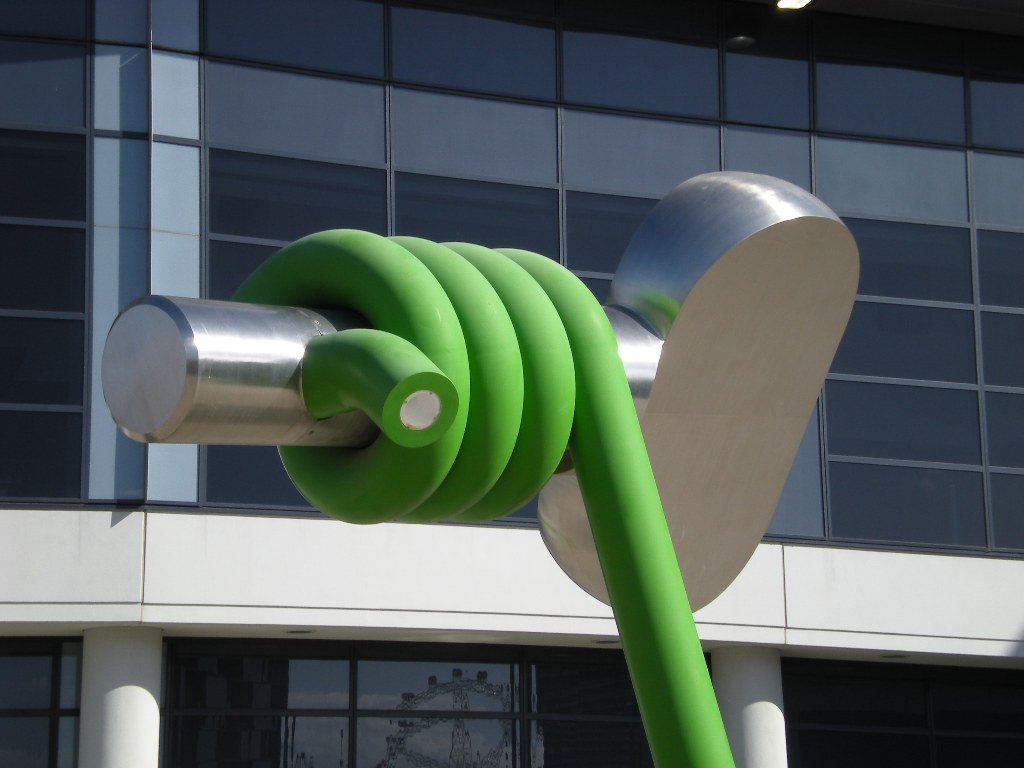
"Threaded Field" by Simon Perry.

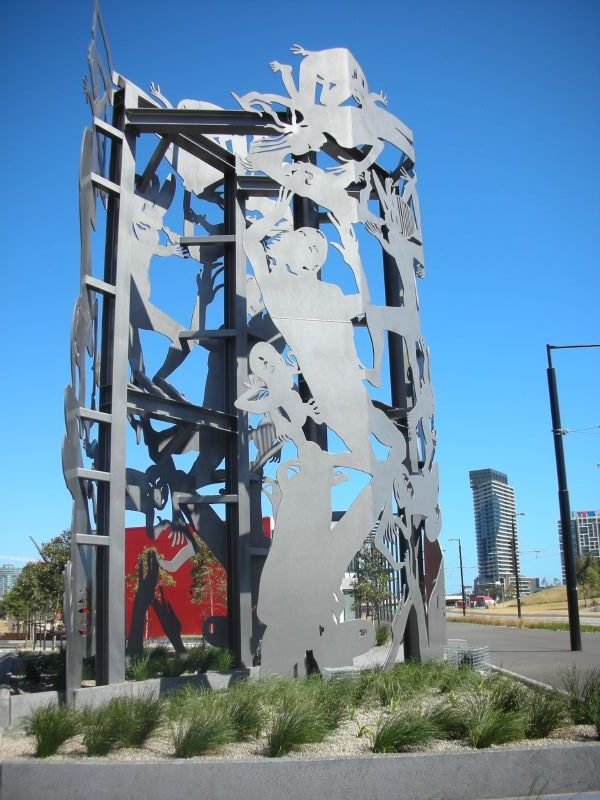
"Continuum" by Michael Snape.

== Transport ==
Harbour esplanade is serviced by the City Circle tram in addition to tram route 70 and route 75.

Future plans also include the creation of a Ferry Terminal via Victoria Harbour.
