= Font distribution =

The units in which metal type is sold, containing relative proportions of letters appropriate for a given language.
