= Dudley Street =

Road in Melbourne, Victoria

Coordinates: 37.8105°S 144.9488°E

Dudley Street Victoria
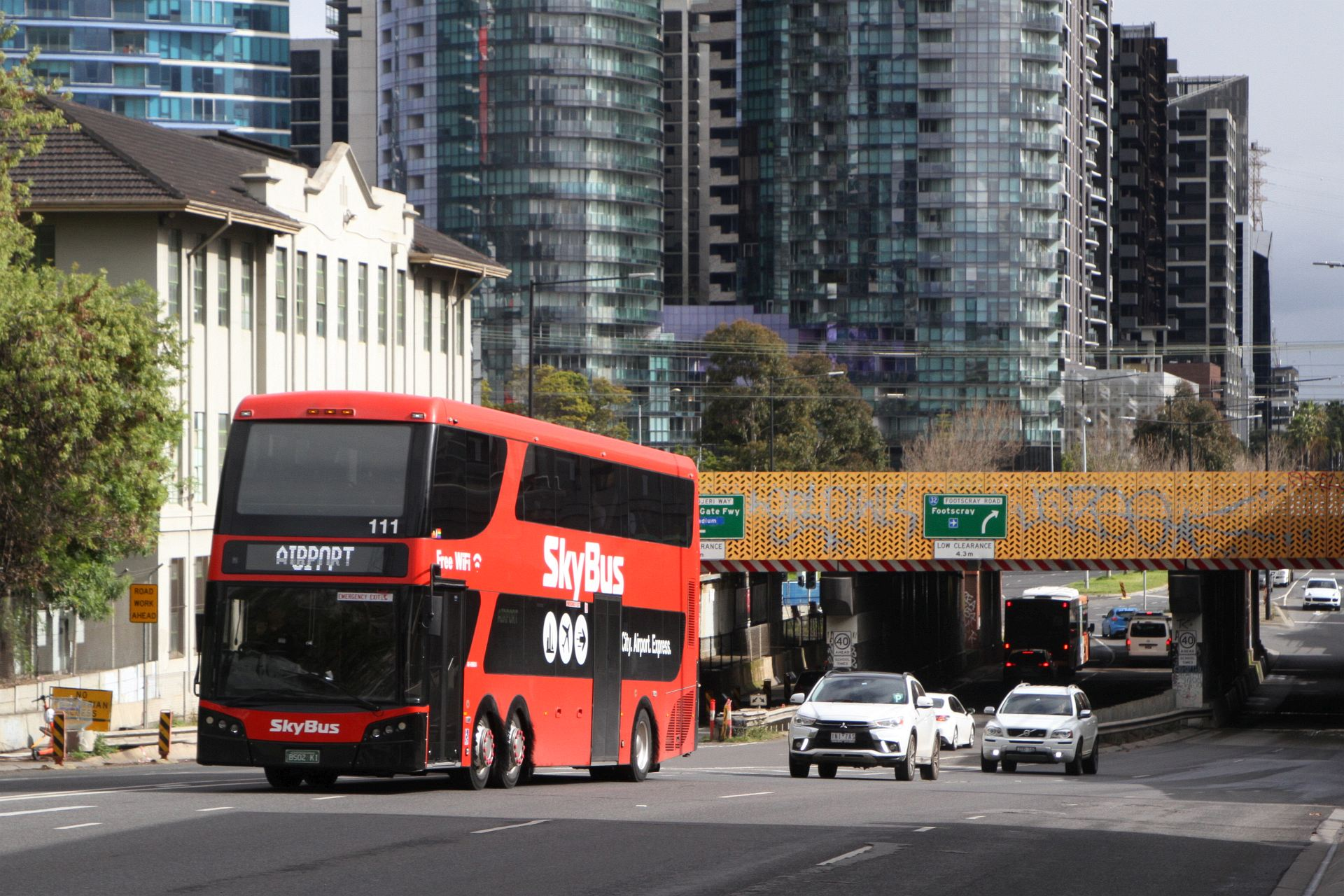
- SkyBus bus on Dudley Street east of the railway underpass, Docklands apartment buildings visible behind

General information
- Type: Street
- Length: 1.2 km (0.7 mi)
- Route number(s): Metro Route 32 (1988–present) Entire route; Metro Route 55 (2005–present) (through West Melbourne)
- Former route number: National Highway 31 (1988–2005) (through West Melbourne)

Major junctions
- West end: Footscray Road; Docklands, Melbourne
- Harbour Esplanade; Wurundjeri Way; Spencer Street; King Street
- East end: Peel Street; Melbourne CBD

Location(s)
- LGA(s): City of Melbourne
- Suburb(s): Docklands, West Melbourne

Dudley Street is a main street in the Melbourne central business district, linking the northern Docklands district to the north-western corner of the CBD. Dudley Street is possibly named after the Governor General from 1908 to 1911, the Second Earl of Dudley, William Humble Ward.

== Route ==
Dudley Street begins at Footscray Road and heads east as a six-lane, dual-carriageway road, nearly immediately intersecting with Wurundjeri Way and then under the North Melbourne rail lines, and continues east as a four-lane, single-carriageway road, crossing Spencer and King streets, and ends at the intersection with Peel Street in the Melbourne CBD, on the western border of the Queen Victoria Market. At its western end, the Depression-era slum camp known as Dudley Flats was occupied by unemployed and homeless people in the 1930s.

Its most famous landmark is the concert venue, Festival Hall.

== History ==
The western end of Dudley Street underwent major reconstruction, which included lowering of the outer lanes to provide a clearance of 5 metres under the existing rail bridges, a new intersection at Wurundjeri Way and a remodelled intersection at Footscray Road; work commenced in April 1999 and was completed in November 2000.

The road was signed Metropolitan Route 32 in 1965, from Footscray Road, before turning south to run along Adderley Street and La Trobe Street to meet Victoria Parade in Carlton. It was re-routed to run further west, turning north and west along Peel and Victoria Streets to Carlton instead, in 1989. National Route 31 was extended along Dudley Street from Peel Street when the West Gate Freeway extension opened in 1988; this was truncated back to Wurundjeri Way when it opened in 1999, and was replaced by Metropolitan Route 55 when the Craigieburn bypass opened in 2005.

The passing of the Road Management Act 2004 granted the responsibility of overall management and development of Victoria's major arterial roads to VicRoads: in 2004, VicRoads re-declared the road as Dudley Street (Arterial #5040), beginning at Footscray Road at Docklands and ending at Peel Street in the Melbourne CBD.

== Intersections ==
Dudley Street is entirely contained within the City of Melbourne local government area.

Location	km	mi	Destinations	Notes
Docklands–West Melbourne boundary	0.0	0.0	Footscray Road (Metro Route 32 north) – Footscray, Laverton North; Docklands Drive (west) – Docklands; Harbour Esplanade (south) – Docklands	Western terminus of street; Metro Route 32 continues north along Footscray Road
Docklands–West Melbourne boundary	0.2	0.12	Wurundjeri Way (Metro Route 55 south, unallocated north) – South Melbourne	Western terminus of concurrency with Metro Route 55; No entrance northbound into, or exit southbound from, Wurundjeri Way
Docklands–West Melbourne boundary	0.3	0.19	Werribee, Williamstown, Sunbury, Craigieburn, Upfield, Western SG and North East SG railway lines	
Docklands–West Melbourne boundary	0.5	0.31	Adderley Street – West Melbourne	
West Melbourne	0.7	0.43	Spencer Street (Metro Route 50), Footscray, South Melbourne	
West Melbourne	0.9	0.56	King Street (Metro Route 60), North Melbourne, Southbank, St Kilda	
West Melbourne–Melbourne CBD boundary	1.2	0.75	Peel Street (Metro Routes 32/55 north, unallocated south) – North Melbourne, Brunswick, Coburg	Eastern terminus of street, Metro Routes 32 and 55 continue north along Peel Street; Eastern terminus of concurrency with Metro Route 55
1.000 mi = 1.609 km; 1.000 km = 0.621 mi: Incomplete access; Route transition
