= One Perfect Day =

One Perfect Day may refer to:

- One Perfect Day (2004 film), an Australian film
- One Perfect Day (2013 film), a South Korean film
- "One Perfect Day" (Little Heroes song), 1982
- "One Perfect Day" (Lydia Denker song), 2004

== See also ==
- Perfect Day (disambiguation)
