= Denker =

Denker is a Dutch and German noun meaning "thinker". Notable people with the surname include:

- Arnold Denker (1914–2005), American chess player
- Henry Denker (1912–2012), American novelist and playwright
- Lydia Denker (born 1982), German-Australian singer-songwriter
- Travis Denker (born 1985), American baseball player

Dencker

- Nils Dencker (born 1953), Swedish mathematician

Denkers

- Dirk Denkers, American soccer player

== See also ==
- Denker Tournament of High School Champions, chess tournament
- Der Denker-Club (The Thinkers Club), cartoon based on a fictitious group of professors and scholars
- Denk (disambiguation)
- Dencker
- Denke
