= Schinderhannes (disambiguation) =

Schinderhannes is the nickname of German outlaw Johannes Bückler (c.1778–1803).

Schinderhannes may also refer to:

- Schinderhannes (band), a Bavarian rock band
- Schinderhannes (card game), a German card game
- Schinderhannes (play), a 1927 play by Carl Zuckmayer
  - The Prince of Rogues (German: Schinderhannes), a 1928 German film based on the play
- Schinderhannes bartelsi, the youngest known radiodont species

== See also ==
- Schinderhansl, a Bavarian card game
