= Real to Me =

"Real to Me" can refer to two songs:

- "Real to Me" (Brian McFadden song), a 2004 song by Irish singer Brian McFadden
- "Real to Me" (Lydia Denker song), a 2000 song by Australian singer Lydia Denker
- Real to Me (EP), a 2021 EP by American singer Callista Clark
