= Denk =

Denk may refer to:

== People ==
- Jeremy Denk (born 1970), American classical pianist
- Michael K. Denk, Canadian professor of chemistry
- Paula Denk (1908–1978), German actress
- Ralph Denk (born 1973), German cyclist and cycling manager
- Ulrike Denk (born 1964), German Olympic athlete
- Winfried Denk (born 1957), German physicist

== Other ==
- Denk (band), an Austrian rock band
- Denk (political party), a Dutch political party

== See also ==
- Denker, a name
- Denke, a name
- Dengg, a name
