= Jim Stynes =

Australian rules footballer (1966–2012)

Jim Stynes OAM
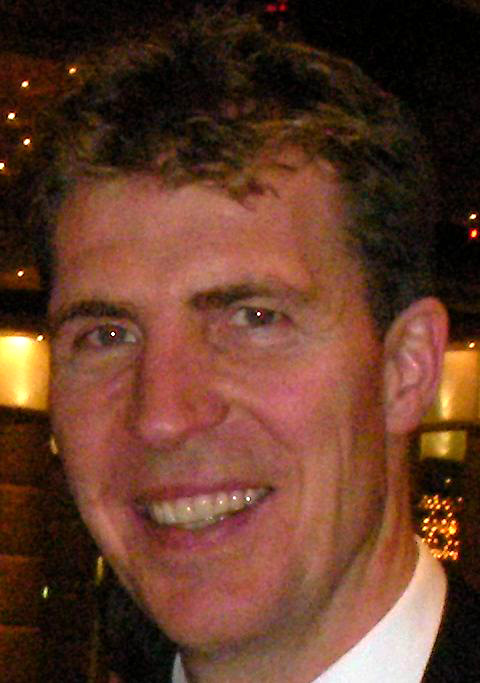
- Stynes in 2008

Personal information
- Full name: James Peter Stynes
- Born: 23 April 1966; Dublin, Ireland
- Died: 20 March 2012 (aged 45); St Kilda, Victoria, Australia
- Original team: Ballyboden St Enda's (club)/Dublin (underage, county team)
- Height: 199 cm (6 ft 6 in)
- Weight: 99 kg (218 lb)
- Position: Ruckman

Playing career^{1}
Years	Club	Games (Goals)
1987–1998	Melbourne	264 (130)

Representative team honours^{2}
Years	Team	Games (Goals)
1990–1994	Victoria	10 (?)

International team honours^{2}
1987–88, 1998	Australia	5 (42pts)
1990	Ireland	3 (11pts)
- ^{1} Playing statistics correct to the end of 1998.^{2} Representative statistics correct as of 1998.

Career highlights
- Melbourne Night Premiership: (1987); 2× All-Australian team: (1991, 1993); Brownlow Medal: (1991); Leigh Matthews Trophy: (1991); 4× Keith 'Bluey' Truscott Medal: (1991, 1995, 1996, 1997); Second most consecutive games in VFL/AFL history (244); Melbourne Team of the Century (Interchange); Australian Football Hall of Fame: 2003; Melbourne Hall of Fame; Australian Sports Medal: 2000

James Peter Stynes OAM (23 April 1966 – 20 March 2012) was an Irish-born Australian rules footballer, youth worker and sports administrator. Stynes played the entirety of his Australian rules football career with the Melbourne Football Club in the Victorian Football League (VFL) and the Australian Football League (AFL) between 1987 and 1998. He was recruited from Dublin through Melbourne's "Irish experiment", Stynes went on to become the first, and only, non-Australian-born player to win the Brownlow Medal in 1991.

Stynes played as a ruckman. He played a then-record 244 consecutive games, a streak that was a record lasting over two decades. He also won the Leigh Matthews Trophy in 1991, two All-Australian team selections, four Keith 'Bluey' Truscott Medals, as Melbourne's best and fairest player and was selected in Melbourne's Team of the Century. He additionally represented Victoria in State of Origin football, as well as playing for both Australia and Ireland in the International Rules series.

Outside of football, Stynes was known for his work with young people. In 1994, Stynes co-founded the Reach Foundation, a youth development organisation. His contributions earned him multiple Victorian of the Year honours and the Medal of the Order of Australia in 2007. After his playing career, he served as the president of the Melbourne Football Club from 2008 until 2012. He was inducted into the Australian Football Hall of Fame in 2003.

In 2009, Stynes was diagnosed with metastatic melanoma. He continued his commitments throughout treatment before dying in 2012 at the age of 45. A state funeral was held and a statue was erected at the Melbourne Cricket Ground. The AFL's annual Jim Stynes Community Leadership Award was created and named in his honour.

== Career ==
During his 264-game career playing for the Melbourne Football Club in the Australian Football League (AFL) between 1987 and 1998, Stynes became the first and only non-Australian-born VFL/AFL player to win the Brownlow Medal, which he achieved in 1991.

Stynes was quite famous in both Australia and Ireland as a result of his involvement in the Melbourne Football Club's international recruitment program (now known as the "Irish experiment"). Born in Dublin, Ireland, where he was a promising Gaelic footballer at the Ballyboden St Enda's club, Stynes made a move to Australia at the age of 18 following his county team's victory in the 1984 All-Ireland Minor Football Championship.

Debuting in the Australian Football League in 1987, he played 244 consecutive games between 1987 and 1998 as a mobile ruckman, a league record that was held for 27 years. Along with his Brownlow Medal, his Australian rules achievements included the Leigh Matthews Trophy, two-time All-Australian team selection, a Grand Final appearance in 1988, and a four-time winner of the Keith 'Bluey' Truscott Medal for being judged Melbourne's best player throughout the course of a season. He also represented Victoria in interstate football matches, and he played for both Australia and Ireland in international rules football, a hybrid of Gaelic football and Australian rules football.

Following his football career, Stynes focused on youth work, using his profile to launch The Reach Foundation, which he co-founded in 1994. As a result of his work with young people in Victoria, he was named Victorian of the Year twice, in 2001 and 2003, and with the expanded profile of Reach nationally, awarded the Medal of the Order of Australia in 2007.

Stynes also served as president of the Melbourne Football Club from 2008 and was involved in fundraising efforts which brought the club out of debt. In 2009, Stynes was diagnosed with metastatic melanoma and continued to work during his treatment for brain metastasis. He died in March 2012 and was honoured by a state funeral held at St Paul's Cathedral in Melbourne on 27 March 2012.

== Early life ==
Stynes was born in Dublin, Ireland, to a Roman Catholic family, the eldest son of Brian and Teresa Stynes, one of six siblings. He grew up in Rathfarnham.

He attended Ballyroan Boys National School. He began playing Gaelic football at the age of eight. From age nine, he played at Ballyboden St Enda's at under-11s level. He attended secondary school at De La Salle College, Churchtown, where he played rugby union while continuing to play Gaelic football for his club alongside his younger brother, Brian.

His first exposure to Australian rules football was watching the 1980 film The Club on television. Stynes represented Dublin in 1984, at the age of eighteen, and was on Dublin's winning side in the All-Ireland Minor Football Championship.

Stynes aspired to a college education; however, he lacked the means and was earning just £10 a week delivering newspapers.

Later in his life, he graduated with a Bachelor of Social Science degree and a Diploma in Youth Work from RMIT University; additionally, he earned a Bachelor of Education degree from Deakin University. He was later awarded with the honorary degree of Doctor of the University from the Australian Catholic University.

=== Switch to Australian rules football ===
In 1984, Stynes responded to an advertisement in his local paper placed by the Melbourne Football Club that offered two scholarships with all expenses paid to play Australian rules football and attend university in Victoria, Australia. Applicants were required to be under 18, over 183 cm and at county standard.

Tall and slim, Stynes was selected, along with James Fahey, and brought to Victoria to undergo a crash course in Australian rules. He signed a two-year contract, hoping to use the money to fund his way through college. Stynes was promised accommodation with an additional $60 weekly stipend, clothing, and $50 a game. He arrived in Australia on 7 November 1984.

Stynes debuted for the Melbourne under-19s team in 1985 and finished the season runner-up in the best and fairest. Ray Jordon, a coach who was experienced with talented juniors, worked intensively with Stynes, and he was sent to Victorian Football Association's Prahran Football Club to compete at senior level.

== VFL/AFL career ==
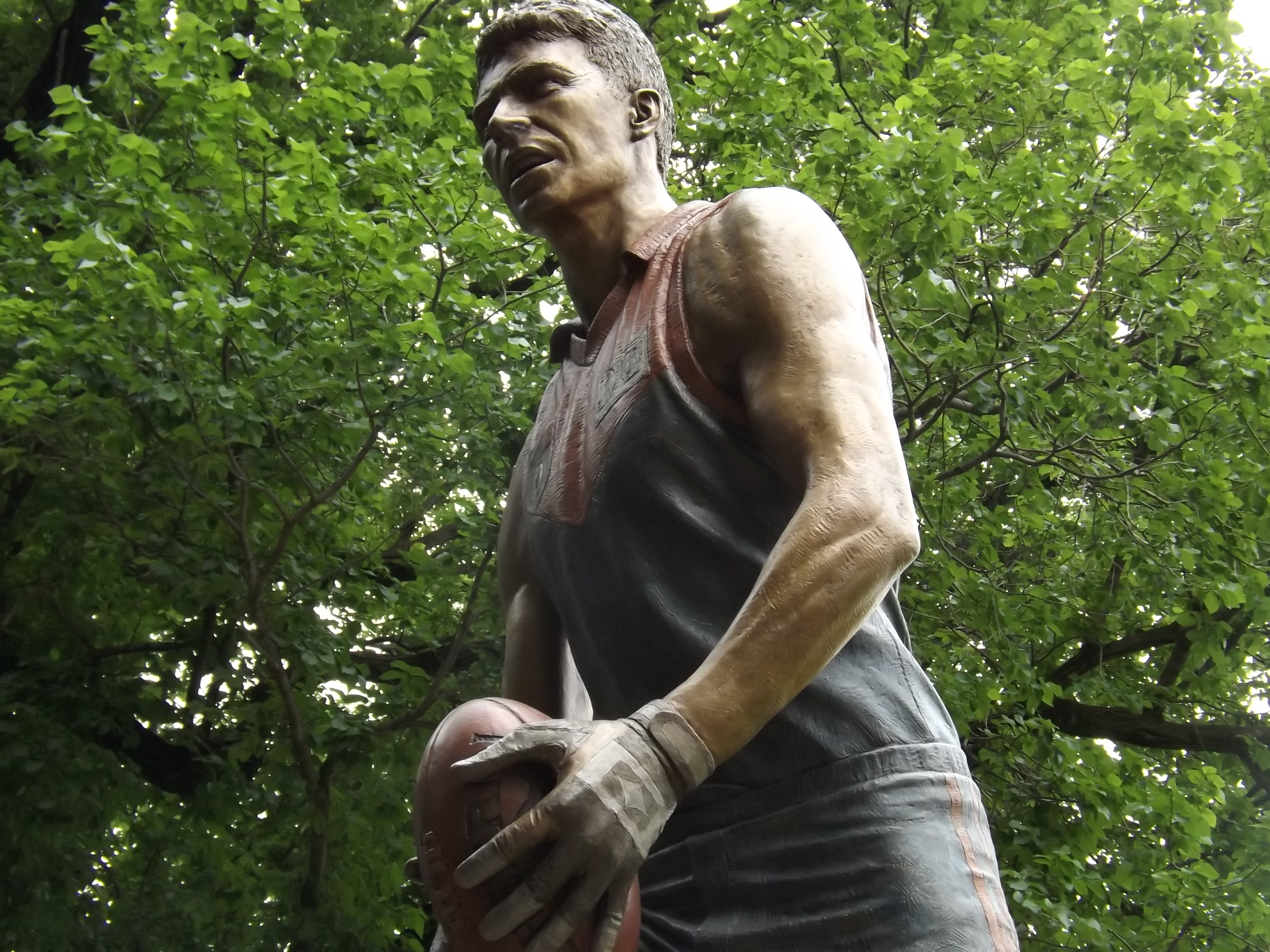
Statue of Stynes outside the Melbourne Cricket Ground

Stynes made his senior debut for the Melbourne Demons in 1987 against Geelong at Kardinia Park. Two weeks later, he played in the Night Series Final against the Essendon Bombers. The Demons' thrilling 4-point victory over the Bombers gave the club its first silverware in 23 years.

Later in 1987, Stynes was part of the senior side which won their last six matches of the home-and-away season to finish in 5th place and qualify for Melbourne's first finals series since 1964. The Demons were cast as a Cinderella team, winning their first two finals by huge margins in front of huge, frenzied crowds. They were just seconds away from an unlikely Grand Final appearance, leading Hawthorn in the Preliminary Final by 4 points when a free kick was awarded to Gary Buckenara fifty metres from goal. Stynes ran through the mark as the final siren sounded; it was an error which resulted in a 15-metre penalty and brought the Hawk forward within range. Buckenara scored the goal, giving his team a two-point win and ending Melbourne's fairytale charge to the premiership (n.b. the 15-metre penalty rule was increased to 50 metres in 1988).

Stynes managed to put this costly mistake behind him. He cemented his position in Melbourne's senior team in 1988 and drew praise for his consistent play and for his innate skills and ability. He played in all 26 games, including the Grand Final versus Hawthorn. Despite his team losing to the Hawks by 96 points, Stynes performed admirably and he was judged to be Melbourne's best player that day.

In 1991, Stynes enjoyed the finest individual season of his career. With his fitness level at an all-time high and four years of experience under his belt, he took his game to another level, dominating the season with a league-best 214 marks. Many of these were taken thanks to his canny reading of the play. He repeatedly intercepted the opposition's long kicks forward with towering marks across the half-back line. He was installed as a hot favourite to win the Brownlow Medal after averaging an astounding 30.6 disposals and 11 marks per game over the final 8 rounds. Stynes polled 25 votes to win the 1991 Brownlow Medal, five votes clear of his nearest rivals. He remains the only non-Australian-born player to receive game's most prestigious individual honour. He was also awarded the AFL Players Association MVP trophy, was named the All-Australian ruckman, and won his first club best-and-fairest award for Melbourne.

Media commentators noted that Stynes had used his extraordinary endurance to redefine the role of the professional ruckman. While many of his opponents were over 2 metres tall, Stynes played in the style of a tall ruck-rover. Instead of focusing on hitouts and playing in bursts, he ran the whole game and gained possession across the entire ground. This was a model of play which many other mid-sized ruckmen such as Geelong and Essendon's John Barnes were able to successfully follow.

An exceptional run of consecutive games which had begun in Round 18 of 1987 almost ended with a severe rib injury in 1993 that Stynes sustained from a collision with teammate David Neitz in a match against the North Melbourne Football Club. He was treated at Epworth Hospital for a compound rib fracture. Despite being ruled out by medical officers for six weeks, he convinced his coach Neil Balme to pass him in the club fitness test and wore a chest guard in order to play the following Friday night.

Stynes finished the season with his consecutive games record unblemished and achieved All-Australian selection for the second time. In 1994, he suffered a medial ligament tear but continued to play through it, going on to string together three fine seasons between 1995 and 1997 in which he won consecutive club champion awards. In Round 9, 1996, Stynes played his 205th consecutive game, breaking the 53-year record held by Jack Titus since 1943.

Stynes broke his hand early in the 1998 season, effectively ending his streak of consecutive games finally at 244. He retired from professional football at the conclusion of the season, having played a total of 264 AFL games, all at Melbourne, placing him second on the club's all-time games tally at the time.

== Statistics ==
Legend
G	Goals	K	Kicks	D	Disposals	T	Tackles
B	Behinds	H	Handballs	M	Marks	H/O	Hit-outs

Led the league after season and finals

Season	Team	No.	Games	Totals								Averages (per game)							
Season	Team	No.	Games	G	B	K	H	D	M	T	H/O	G	B	K	H	D	M	T	H/O
1987	Melbourne	37	13	15	10	116	45	161	48	8	114	1.2	0.8	8.9	3.5	12.4	3.7	0.6	8.8
1988	Melbourne	11	26	26	13	316	107	423	135	21	196	1.0	0.5	12.2	4.1	16.3	5.2	0.8	7.5
1989	Melbourne	11	24	17	14	327	112	439	119	26	254	0.7	0.6	13.6	4.7	18.3	5.0	1.1	10.6
1990	Melbourne	11	24	11	8	306	129	435	125	25	258	0.5	0.3	12.8	5.4	18.1	5.2	1.0	10.8
1991	Melbourne	11	24	15	10	382	232	614	214	11	256	0.6	0.4	15.9	9.7	25.6	8.9	0.5	10.7
1992	Melbourne	11	22	9	3	334	180	514	166	13	335	0.4	0.1	15.2	8.2	23.4	7.5	0.6	15.2
1993	Melbourne	11	20	6	8	265	179	444	123	6	264	0.3	0.4	13.3	9.0	22.2	6.2	0.3	13.2
1994	Melbourne	11	25	10	8	241	179	420	126	16	269	0.4	0.3	9.6	7.2	16.8	5.0	0.6	10.8
1995	Melbourne	11	22	9	3	264	137	401	134	15	242	0.4	0.1	12.0	6.2	18.2	6.1	0.7	11.0
1996	Melbourne	11	22	7	10	267	182	449	144	26	349	0.3	0.5	12.1	8.3	20.4	6.5	1.2	15.9
1997	Melbourne	11	22	3	4	279	172	451	126	16	320	0.1	0.2	12.7	7.8	20.5	5.7	0.7	14.5
1998	Melbourne	11	20	2	6	145	89	234	56	6	253	0.1	0.3	7.3	4.5	11.7	2.8	0.3	12.7
Career			264	130	97	3242	1743	4985	1516	189	3110	0.5	0.4	12.3	6.6	18.9	5.7	0.7	11.8

== Honours and achievements ==
**Brownlow Medal votes**
Season	Votes
1987	—
1988	4
1989	10
1990	5
**1991**	**25**
1992	8
1993	12
1994	7
1995	15
1996	11
1997	4
1998	4
**Total**	**105**
Key:
Green / **Bold** = Won

- **Team**
  - McClelland Trophy: (Melbourne) 1990
  - Night Series Premiership (Melbourne): 1987,1989
- **Individual**
  - Brownlow Medal: 1991
  - Keith 'Bluey' Truscott Medal: 1991, 1995–1997
  - Leigh Matthews Trophy (AFLPA MVP Award): 1991
  - All-Australian: 1991, 1993
  - Herald Sun Player of the Year Award: 1991
  - **Melbourne F.C. Team of the Century**
  - Australian Football Hall of Fame inductee: 2003

== Youth work and founding of Reach ==
In 1994, Stynes co-founded (with film director Paul Currie) The Reach Foundation and became a prominent youth worker in Victoria.

In addition to Reach, Stynes worked on government advisory boards, including the 1997 Victorian Government Suicide Task Force and the Federal Minister For Youth's Youth Advisory Consultative Forum Committee.

== Writer ==
Stynes authored several books. His written works include two autobiographies: Whatever It Takes (1996) with Jim Main and My Journey (2012) with Warwick Green, along with children's self-help books co-written by Dr Jon Carnegie, including Heroes (2003) and Finding Heroes (2006).

== Melbourne Football Club chairman ==
In 2008, Stynes began expressing an interest in becoming chairman. In June 2008, Melbourne's chairman, Paul Gardner, stepped down as president to make way for Stynes.

His early-stated main goal at this stage was to increase the Melbourne membership total—especially the junior membership base as stated on The Footy Show on 12 June 2008. Shortly following his election, he declared his staunch stance against any proposed relocation of the club to the Gold Coast or elsewhere.

In March 2011, Stynes met Prince William, Duke of Cambridge, in Kerang, teaching him basic Australian rules football skills.

In July 2011, Stynes, in his role as chairman, announced the sacking of Dean Bailey as Melbourne Football Club senior coach after a club board meeting due to an embarrassing 186-point loss to Geelong in Round 19, 2011. Stynes said he found it extremely hard to tell Bailey of the club's decision, stating: "It wasn't something I was looking forward to," and "It makes it hard, because Dean Bailey is such a great man and a man of integrity".

In December 2011, Stynes handed his #11 guernsey to new recruit Mitch Clark. In February 2012, Stynes stepped down from the presidency of Melbourne, citing a desire to devote his energies towards his family and wellbeing. He was succeeded by his vice-president, Don McLardy.

== Honours and awards ==
The Jim Stynes Medal was named in Stynes' honour and first awarded in 1998 to the best Australian player in the International Rules series. The Jim Stynes Cup (also known as the Jim Stynes trophy) was named in Stynes' honour and awarded to the winner of the inaugural International Australian Football Youth Tournament.

In 2000, Stynes received an Australian Sports Medal and was named in Melbourne Football Club's Team of the Century. In 2001, he received the Centenary Medal "for establishing and leading a Reach organisation for youth development" and was named Victorian of the Year.

In 2003, Stynes was inducted into the Australian Football Hall of Fame and was named Victorian of the Year. In 2006, during the redevelopment of the Melbourne Cricket Ground, a new corporate dining and function room in level 2 of the Olympic Stand was named the "Jim Stynes Room" in honour of Stynes.

In 2007, he was awarded the Medal of the Order of Australia for his work with youth and contribution to Australian rules football.

Stynes was named Melburnian of the Year for 2010 for his Reach Foundation work. He was named a Doctor of the University by the Australian Catholic University in recognition of his social work.

== Illness ==
On 2 July 2009, Stynes held a media conference to inform the public that he had developed cancer. A lump in his back was shown to be melanoma, and tests revealed that his cancer had metastasised, i.e. spread to other regions in his body. Stynes intended to make clear that he was not stepping down from his role as president of the Melbourne Football Club but instead just taking a break to seek treatment.

On 4 April 2010, it was revealed that his condition had worsened, and three days later he had surgery for brain metastasis. He continued to work during his treatment and participated in the filming of a television documentary about his life and his battle with cancer, Every Heart Beats True: The Jim Stynes Story, produced by friends Jules Lund and Reach co-founder Paul Currie, which aired on 19 September 2010 on the Nine Network.

=== Death ===
Stynes died at his home in St Kilda on 20 March 2012, aged 45. He was cremated, and his ashes were scattered at a "treasured spot" he chose before he died.

=== Reactions to death and legacy ===
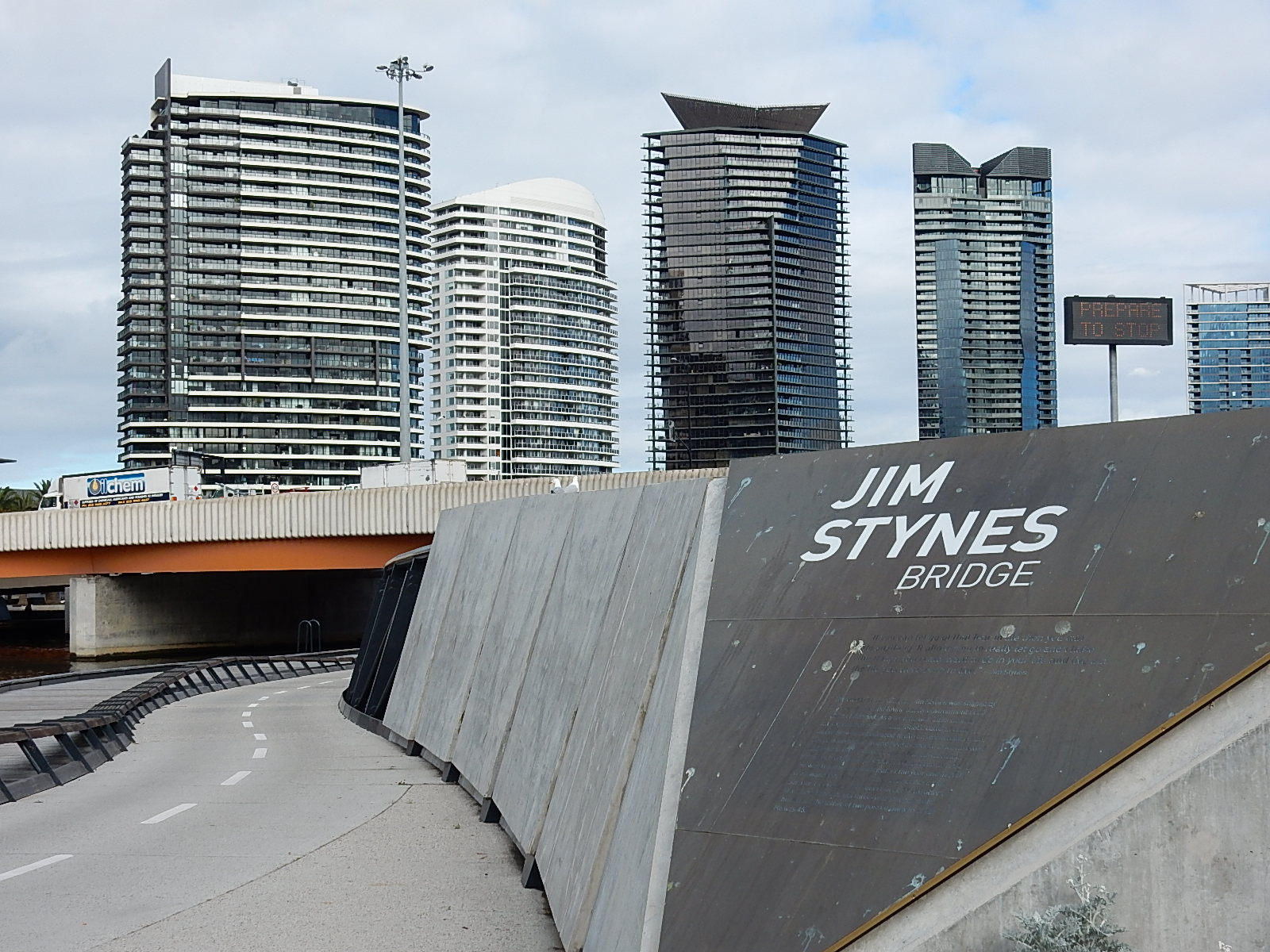
Jim Stynes Bridge in Docklands, Melbourne

Ted Baillieu, the Premier of Victoria, described Stynes as "an exceptional Victorian", and he later offered a state funeral to Stynes' family, which was accepted.

The memorial was held at St Paul's Cathedral (an Anglican cathedral, although Stynes was Roman Catholic) in central Melbourne on 27 March 2012, with the service shown on screen at Federation Square.

Former teammate and captain Garry Lyon gave an emotional tribute to Stynes on The Footy Show, saying: "Jimmy refused to let the game define who he was. It was just a part of him and it allowed us to marvel at his determination, unwavering self-belief, resilience, strength, skill, endurance and courage" and that his good friend "was secure enough to know that displaying vulnerability can be a strength and not a weakness".

A moment of silence was observed at the Melbourne Cricket Ground on the day of Stynes' death, and both the Melbourne Football Club and the Casey Scorpions unveiled its VFL-affiliate plan to commemorate Stynes at their first home games in 2012.

At the launch of the 2012 Australian Football League season, both Stynes' replacement as president of the Melbourne Football Club, Don McLardy, and the AFL's chief executive officer, Andrew Demetriou, acknowledged his contribution to football in Australia.

A minute's silence was observed before the season-opening Sydney Derby between the Greater Western Sydney Giants and Sydney Swans.

A commemoration was held prior to Dublin's National Football League match against Donegal, both of which were held on the Saturday after Stynes' death.

Melbourne ruckman and captain Max Gawn paid tribute to Stynes, among other deceased club identities, in a post-match interview upon the club winning the 2021 AFL Grand Final, which had been 57 years in the making. Stynes presented Gawn with his number 37 before Gawn's debut in 2011, and Gawn later switched to the number 11 jumper just as Stynes had done.

==== The Jim Stynes Achievement Scholarships ====
An A$3 million 5-year partnership with the Australian government, Reach Foundation and Australian Football League for children of indigenous or multicultural backgrounds—or from disadvantaged backgrounds—was announced following Stynes' death.

==== Jim Stynes Foundation ====
The Jim Stynes Foundation is a nonprofit founded in 2015 to "continue developing programs and initiatives that embody resilience, prioritizes mental health and shapes our future".

==== Jim Stynes Community Leadership Award ====
Established in 2012, the year of Stynes' passing, the Jim Stynes Community Leadership Award is a cash award given annually to "current AFL and AFLW players who demonstrate a commitment to the community and helping others". The award is donated to the charity or community program of the winner's choosing. The award is announced annually on Brownlow Medal night for the AFL players and at the W Awards for AFLW players.

Past Recipients
Year	AFL Recipient	AFLW Recipient
2012	Daniel Jackson	—N/a
2013	Zac Smith	—N/a
2014	Beau Waters	—N/a
2015	Dennis Armfield	—N/a
2016	Jimmy Bartel	—N/a
2017	Jack Hombsch	—N/a
2018	Neville Jetta	—N/a
2019	Stephen Coniglio	—N/a
2020	Bachar Houli	—N/a
2021	Travis Boak	—N/a
2022	Joel Selwood	—N/a
2023	Sam Docherty	—N/a
2024	Reilly O'Brien	Madi Scanlon
2025	Harris Andrews	Kate Darby
2026	Bailey Banfield	

The Jim Stynes Community Leadership Award is currently a joint venture between the AFL and the Jim Stynes Foundation. As of 2023, A$220,000 has been distributed among various charities and community programs.

== Personal life ==
Stynes' family has a strong history in Gaelic football. His uncle Joe Stynes was an All-Ireland Gaelic footballer with Dublin (1923). His younger brother Brian won an All-Ireland with Dublin (1995). Jim played against Brian in the International Rules Series against Ireland many times. Brian followed Jim to play professional Australian rules at Melbourne; however, he returned to Ireland having played just two senior games in 1992.

Another younger brother, David, also played both Gaelic football and Australian rules, albeit at an amateur level, having played in the Ireland national Australian rules football team. He was the first player to win the cup twice, being a member of the winning team in the 2002 International Cup and 2011 International Cup. His cousin Chris Stynes is a former Major League Baseball utility player.

=== Family ===
Jim Stynes and his wife, Samantha, had a daughter, Matisse, and a son, Tiernan.

== See also ==
- List of players who have converted from one football code to another
- Jim Stynes Bridge
- Jim Stynes Medal
