= Deuker =

Deuker is a surname. Notable people with the surname include:

- Carl Deuker (born 1950), author of young adult novels
- Ernst Ulrich Deuker (born 1954), German bass player and contrabass clarinet player

== See also ==
- Decker (surname)
- Denker
