= Dencker =

Dencker is a surname of German origin, being a variant of the surname Denker, which originated as a nickname for a left-handed person. Notable people with the surname include:

- Mette Dencker (born 1978), Danish politician
- Mikkel Dencker (born 1975), Danish politician
- Nils Dencker (born 1953), Swedish mathematician

== See also ==
- Denker
