= Perfect Days (disambiguation) =

Perfect Days is a 2023 Japanese-German drama film directed by Wim Wenders.

Perfect Days may also refer to:

- Perfect Days, a 1998 play by Liz Lochhead
- Perfect Days – I ženy mají své dny, a 2011 Czech film directed by Alice Nellis
- Perfect Days, a 2014 novel by Raphael Montes
- Madison Blues (album), a compilation album by Fleetwood Mac re-packaged as Perfect Days

== See also ==
- Perfect Day (disambiguation)
