= Warwick Green =

Australian rules footballer and writer (born 1966)

Personal information
- Full name: Warwick Green
- Born: 27 December 1966 (age 59)
- Original team: Wesley College
- Height: 194 cm (6 ft 4 in)
- Weight: 84 kg (185 lb)
- Position: Ruck

Playing career^{1}
Years	Club	Games (Goals)
1987–88	St Kilda	9 (0)
- ^{1} Playing statistics correct to the end of 1988.

Warwick Green (born 27 December 1966) is a writer and a former Australian rules footballer who played with St Kilda in the Victorian Football League (VFL).

Since retiring from football Warwick Green has worked as a journalist and a freelance writer. He has been a journalist and sports editor with The Age, the Sunday Age and the Herald Sun. He has co-written the autobiographies of Jim Stynes, Kurt Fearnley and Neale Daniher. The Neale Daniher book, When All is Said & Done, won the Biography of the Year Award at the 2020 Australian Book Industry Awards.

Green and his wife Tif have three children.

== Books ==
- My Journey (with Jim Stynes, 2012)
- Walk Tall: The Young Readers' Edition of the Jim Stynes Autobiography, My Journey (with Jim Stynes, 2014)
- Pushing the Limits: Life, Marathons & Kokoda (with Kurt Fearnley, 2014)
- When All is Said & Done (with Neale Daniher, 2019)
