= Tragic Daydreams =

Studio album by Mandy Kane
- Released: 4 April 2004
- Recorded: 2003
- Genre: Pop; rock
- Length: 51:40
- Label: Warner Music Australia
- Producer: Mandy Kane

Tragic Daydreams is the debut album by Australian songwriter Mandy Kane, released in 2004. The album peaked at number 79 in Australia.

== Singles ==
The lead single, "Stab", was released on 14 July 2003 and peaked at number 18 in Australia. Second single "Billy Bones" was released on 20 October 2003, debuting and peaking at number 27 in Australia. The third single, "Stupid Friday", followed on 1 March 2004, peaking at number 36 in Australia. The fourth single, "Make Believe", was only released to radio later in 2004.

== Track listing ==
1. "Stab" – 3:49
2. "Billy Bones" – 3:21
3. "Spastic Annie" – 3:36
4. "Stupid Friday" – 4:20
5. "Apparition" – 4:26
6. "Yes! Matron" – 3:22
7. "Ordinary Guy" – 3:45
8. "Make Believe" – 3:38
9. "Subsequently Sad" – 4:22
10. "Touch" – 4:06
11. "Trailer Trash Theme Park" – 4:02
12. "The Mannequin Ball" – 4:52
13. "Traces" – 4:01

== Charts ==
Chart performance for Tragic Daydreams
Chart (2004)	Peak position
Australian Albums (ARIA)	79
