= Mandy Kane =

Australian rock musician

- Origin: Melbourne, Australia
- Genres: Alternative; rock; electronic; indie
- Occupations: Singer; songwriter; producer; remixer
- Years active: 2002—present
- Labels: Warner Music Australia; Mummy's Boy Records; The Majestika Creative

Mandy Kane is a singer, songwriter, producer and remixer. He is best known for his single "Stab" which peaked at number 18 on the ARIA charts in 2004.

== Career ==
=== 1990s–2002: Early years ===
Mandy Kane started playing in high school rock bands and worked in part-time jobs to save money to buy a 4-track recorder. He says his songs are inspired by a variety of rock icons from bygone eras – from David Bowie and Gary Numan to The Beatles and Pink Floyd.

Seeking other outlets to develop his musical and theatrical sensibilities, he joined local drama groups and rallied locals to play in his band. After he had produced a number of songs with his basic home recording setup, Kane started sending out demos to record companies and managers.

Michael Newton of Roundhouse Entertainment can be credited with discovering Kane and taking on a management role in the early stages of his career. Newton's involvement resulted in a publishing deal with Mushroom Music after Michael Gudinski attended one of Kane's showcases at Revolver Upstairs. Kane was eventually signed by Warner Music Australasia.

=== 2003–2005: Tragic Daydreams ===
Mandy Kane relocated to Los Angeles to work with producers Chris Vrenna and Joe Chiccarelli. Tony Espie was commissions to mix Kane's recordings, which were then mastered at The Exchange in London.

Mandy Kane's debut single, "Stab" was released in July 2003. The single is both a statement against teen suicide and a reference to the 'stabbing' Numanesque synths featured throughout. "Stab" peaked at number 18 in the ARIA charts. "Billy Bones" was released as the second single in October 2003, reaching number 27 in the ARIA charts. Billy Bones is a fictitious character, vaguely based on Kane's experimentation with home recording equipment as a teenager. A third single titled "Stupid Friday" was released in March 2004 and peaked at number 36 in the ARIA charts. Mandy Kane's debut album Tragic Daydreams was released in April 2004 and peaked at number 79 on the ARIA Charts.

To promote the album, Kane toured extensively with the original line-up expanded to include Zakk Zedras (Roxus, Serpentine, Red Circle & Rie Nakayama. Kane played a showcase gig at the Australian premiere of the Matrix Revolutions before an audience including Keanu Reeves. This line-up also toured with Marilyn Manson.

Mandy Kane's cover version of "Ordinary World" by Duran Duran features on the soundtrack to the Australian movie "One Perfect Day."

=== 2006–present: Independent releases ===
In 2006, Mandy Kane formed his own independent label, "Mummy's Boy Records" (which would later be renamed "The Majestika Creative"), through which he released his first independent single, "(UK) Hanky Panky" as a digital download. It features on the EP, "Murder in the Daylight", which was released in April 2006.

Mandy Kane commissioned the then fledgling band Van She to remix the title track from the EP as its second single. The track received an Honourable Mention in the Billboard Song Contest.

In May 2008, Mandy Kane released the stand-alone digital single "Far From Oblivion". He also recorded an acoustic version to include as a B-side.

In 2009 Mandy Kane released the single "25 Seconds". Gary Numan and his producer Ade Fenton were commissioned to remix the song. This remix received considerable rotation on radio and at clubs in Australia and abroad, with Numan himself praising Kane for his songwriting ability.

In November 2015, Mandy Kane released the EP Darkness & Divine as well as a re-recording of his debut studio titled Tragic Daydreams Reimagined.

In December 2023, Mandy Kane released the mini-album Runestones & Keymasters (An Oratorio), combining mysticism and folklore with vintage rock tones, orchestral arrangements, and well refined song-craft.

== Artist development, production and management ==
In addition to continuing to produce and release his own material, Mandy Kane has worked as a producer and manager for several other artists.

Mandy Kane worked with Nathaniel Willemse, during which time he co-wrote and produced several songs which resulted in the release of a debut EP for the artist titled Vertigo. The title track, a cover of the popular U2 single, was marketed as part of a Video Hits competition which gave the release four weeks of consecutive rotation on commercial television in Australia.

From 2009–2012, Kane assisted in developing and co-managed Australian act Dancing Heals. He mixed their debut EP Out of This and produced their debut album Into the Night, which was recorded at Red Door Sounds.

Kane accompanied the band on a tour of North America in 2010, which saw the band play to sold out venues as well as establishing international fans and industry contacts. The album was well received by reviewers and the public alike, with the single "Diamonds" enjoying five weeks of repeated rotation on Australia's prime music video television program Rage. International audiences also responded favourably, with "Into the Night" debuting in the Top 20 specialty radio charts in the US.

== Discography ==
=== Albums ===
List of albums with selected details
Title	Details	Peak chart positions
Title	Details	AUS
Tragic Daydreams	Released: April 2004; Label: Warner Music Australia (2564601702); Format: CD, digital download	79
Tragic Daydreams Reimagined	Released: November 2015; Label: The Majestika Creative; Format: Digital download, streaming	—

=== Extended plays ===
List of EPs with selected details
Title	Details
Murder in the Daylight	Released: April 2006; Label: Mummy's Boy Records (MBRCD00106); Format: CD, digital download
Darkness & Divine	Released: 27 November 2015; Label: The Majestika Creative; Format: Digital download, streaming
Runestones & Keymasters (An Oratorio)	Released: 1 December 2023; Label: The Majestika Creative; Format: Digital download, streaming

=== Singles ===
List of singles, with selected chart positions
Title	Year	Peak chart positions	Album / EP / Single
Title	Year	AUS	Album / EP / Single
"Stab"	2003	18	Tragic Daydreams
"Billy Bones"	2003	27	Tragic Daydreams
"Stupid Friday"	2004	36	Tragic Daydreams
"(UK) Hanky Panky"	2006	—	Murder in the Daylight
"Murder in the Daylight"	2006	—	Murder in the Daylight
"I Challenge The Runes"	2023	—	Runestones & Keymasters (An Oratorio)
"Far from Oblivion"	2008	—	Non-album singles
"25 Seconds"	2009	—	Non-album singles
"Ego Te Eludere"	2016	—	Non-album singles
"Starman"	2017	–	Non-album singles
