= Denke =

Denke is a surname of German origin, meaning to "think". Notable people with the surname include:

- Denké Kossi Wazo (1958-2014), full name Julien Kossi Denke, Togolese international football player
- Karl Denke (1860-1924), German serial killer and cannibal

== See also ==
- Denk (disambiguation)
- Denker
