= Hannes Ringlstetter =

Johannes Ringlstetter
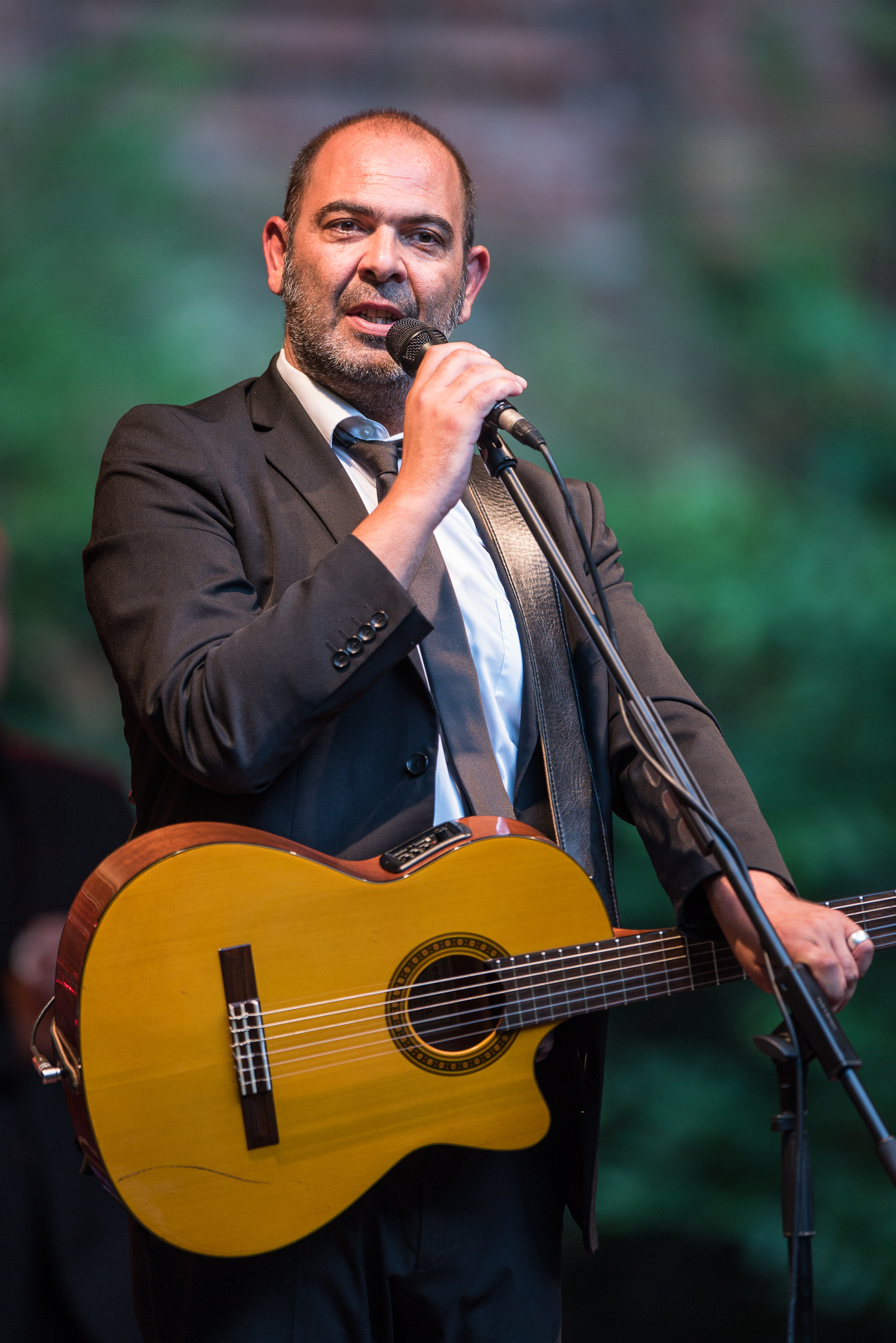
- Hannes Ringlstetter in 2017
- Born: 2 June 1970 (age 55); Munich, West Germany
- Occupation(s): German kabarettist, comedian
- Website: https://www.ringlstettertv.de/

Johannes "Hannes" Ringlstetter (born 2 June 1970 in Munich) is a German kabarettist, comedian, musician, actor, TV presenter and writer of his book "Bekenntnisse" (2005) and of several short stories.

== Biography ==
Ringlstetter grew up in Straubing. After his alternative service, he studied history and German studies at the University of Regensburg. At this time he founded the band Schinderhannes, of which he is lead singer. After his practical training at the regional TV station TVA, he presented several programs and was editor of the TV production "Unterwegs mit Hannes Ringlstetter" (On the way with Hannes Ringlstetter). After 2005, several stage engagements followed, for example at the Theater Regensburg, at the Münchener Studententheater (Munich student theater), at the Schmidt Theater in Hamburg, in the TV cabaret series "Ottis Schlachthof" and at the Münchner Lach- und Schießgesellschaft cabaret theater. Furthermore, he played several roles in TV series, for example in "Lady Mayerhofer" and in "Balko", as well as in the cinema productions "MA 2412 – Die Staatsdiener" and "Liebe Sünde" (Vol. II – Schlagerrevue), a Schauspiel Compagnia Regensburg production.

In 2007, Ringlstetter received a lot of press coverage his role as hunchbacked farm-hand in the play "Der Watzmann ruft" at the Münchner Lustspielhaus (Munich comedy house), where he played aside of Nepo Fitz who plays the "Bub" (guy).

Since 2 September 2007, Ringlstetter has toured with his play "Von einem andern Stern" (from another star), a solo play with piano and guitar. The debut performance of his solo play "Meine Verehrung" (my admiration) was on 1 September 2010. He also played the role of the takeaway owner "Yazid" in the TV production Hubert & Staller, which had its debut in November 2011. He also frequently is in the TV show Grünwald Freitagscomedy.

Ringlstetter is member of the Quatsch Comedy Club. Since 2016 he also has his own talk show Ringlstetter. The same year he also released his debut album "PNY – Paris – New York – Alteiselfing". 2018 his second album "Fürchtet euch nicht" (fear not), 2021 his third album "Heile Welt" (innocent world).

== Awards ==
- 2009: 2nd prize at the "Tuttlinger Krähe" awards
- 2010: Franconian Kabarett Prize
