= Jim Stynes Bridge =

Melbourne, Australia pedestrian bridge

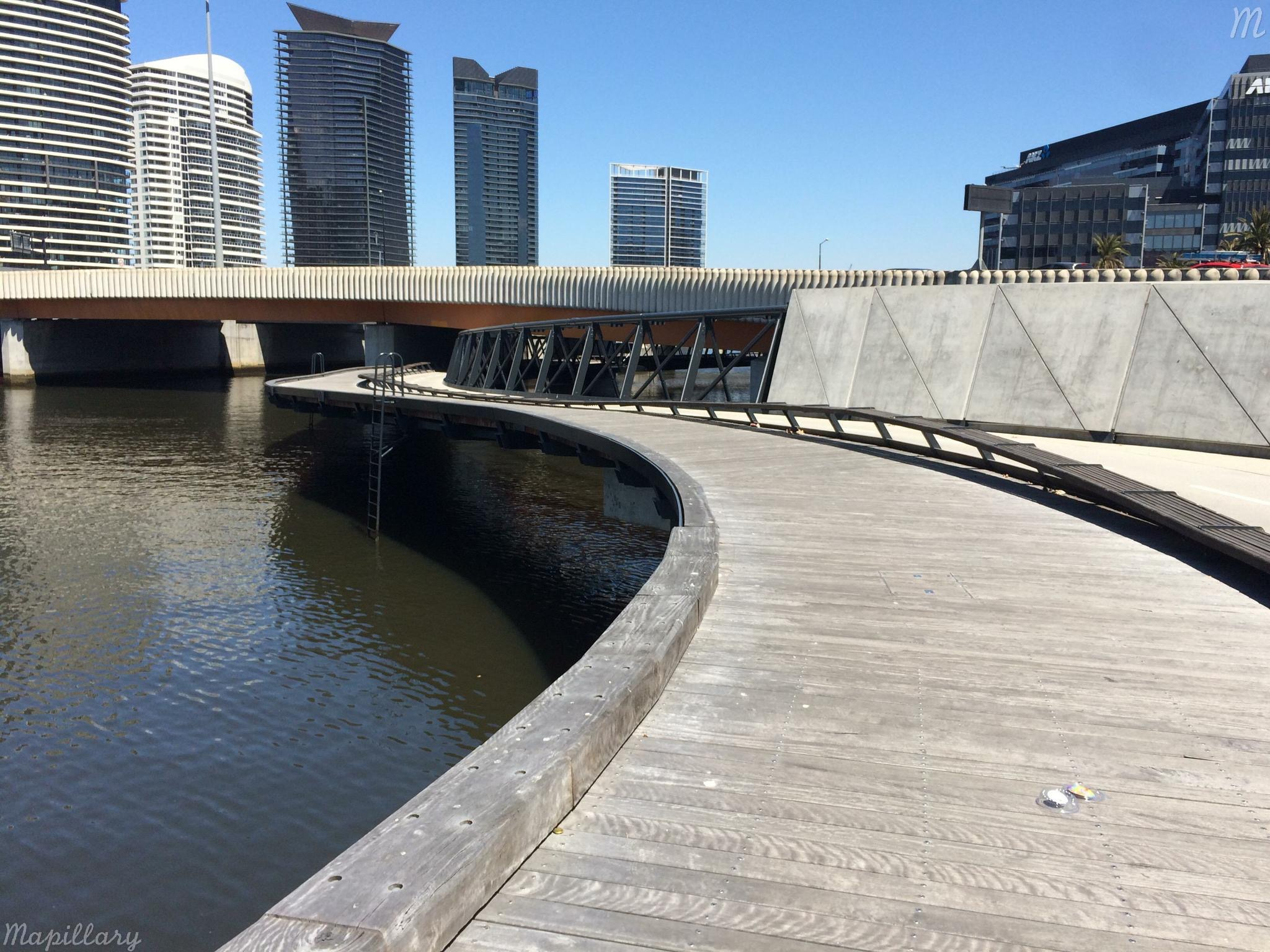
- Coordinates: 37°49′22.7″S 144°56′53″E
- Carries: Pedestrians, Bicycles
- Crosses: Yarra River
- Locale: Melbourne, Victoria, Australia
- Maintained by: VicRoads

Characteristics
- Design: Suspension bridge
- Material: Steel
- Total length: 120 metres (390 ft)

History
- Architect: Cox Architecture
- Constructed by: Fitzgerald Constructions Australia
- Opened: 18 June 2014

Location
- Interactive map of Jim Stynes Bridge

The Jim Stynes Bridge is a pedestrian bridge over the Yarra River at Docklands precinct in Melbourne, Victoria, Australia.

The new bridge provides a vital link for pedestrians, cyclists and commuters between the Melbourne central business district, and the key precincts of Docklands and Northbank. Designed as a horizontal suspension bridge, it arcs out 30 metres over the river and creates the illusion it is hovering unsupported above it, passing under the Charles Grimes Bridge.

The bridge was named after Jim Stynes, a prominent Ireland-born player of Australian rules football who died in 2012. Two bronze plaques outlining Stynes' achievements are installed at each end of the bridge.
