= Schinderhannes (band) =

- Origin: Regensburg, Germany
- Genres: Rock
- Years active: 1992–2004
- Labels: Amigo; Apostel; Klimper & Schepper
- Past members: Hannes Ringlstetter; Jochen Goricnik; Marco Köstler

schinderhannes is a bavarian dialect rock band from Regensburg, Germany, founded by Hannes Ringlstetter in 1992. Schinderhannes originally was the nickname of Johannes Bückler. Hannes Ringlstetter (voice, guitar and accordion) had already been on solo tour with this nickname since 1989.

== Band members ==
The cadre trio consists of Hannes Ringlstetter, Jochen Goricnik (joined the band in 1996; guitar, bass, mandolin and background voice) and Marco Köstler (joined the band in 1997; keyboard instruments, background voice and strings music soli).

Supporting members are/were Annette Frank (voice and equalizer), Bernhard Frank (arrangements/programming, guitar, bass, keyboards and percussions), Michael Eber (drums), Michael Thomas (drums), Markus Paul (bass), Markus Fritsch (bass), Tobias Heindl (violin), Hans Wax (vihuela), Edgar Feichtner (bugle, trombone, alphorn and accordion), Peter Feichtner (tuba), Wolfgang Dersch (trombone), Stefan Lang (trumpet) and Martin Jungmayer (saxophone).

== Work ==
In 2000 the band signed a record contract with Amigo Records. The published single Da bin i dahoam (Bavarian for "Da bin ich daheim"; there I am at home) was elected as official song at the "Fest der Bayern" (festival of the Bavarians) in Regensburg. Later the band founded the own record label Klimper & Schepper. The H-Blockx and Anastacia covered the song Mach di frei (2001; Bavarian for "Mach dich frei"; free yourself) was covered at the Rock im Park festival. In 2002, schinderhannes was the warm-up group of Hubert von Goisern.

== Discography ==
- Da bin i dahoam (MCD; Amigo Records)
- Live (Amigo Records)
- Mach di frei (Apostel Records)
- Die ewige Landpartie (Klimper & Schepper)
- Himmelfahrt (Klimper & Schepper)
- Heit nocht (together with Denk; single)

== Awards ==
- "Telly" of the Bayerische Landeszentrale für neue Medien (BLM)
- Media award of the Bavarian local and regional television broadcasting
