= Perfect Day =

Perfect Day, A Perfect Day, or The Perfect Day may refer to:

== Film and television ==
- Perfect Day (1929 film), an American comedy short starring Laurel and Hardy
- Perfect Day (2005 film), a British television film
- A Perfect Day (2005 film), a Lebanese film
- A Perfect Day (2006 film), an American television Christmas film
- A Perfect Day (2008 film), an Italian film
- A Perfect Day (2015 film), a Spanish film
- Perfect Day (Sapphire & Steel), a 2007 audio drama based on the television series Sapphire & Steel
- Perfect Day, the sequel series to New Scandinavian Cooking

=== Episodes ===
- "Perfect Day" (2point4 children), 1998
- "Perfect Day" (Ben 10), 2007
- "A Perfect Day" (Cold Case), 2005
- "Perfect Day" (Ghosts), 2020

== Music ==
=== Albums ===
- Perfect Day (Cascada album) or the title song (see below), 2007
- Perfect Day (Chris Whitley album), 2000
- Perfect Day (Lou Reed album) or the 1972 title song (see below), 1997
- A Perfect Day (album), by Stefanie Sun, or the title song, 2005
- A Perfect Day (EP), a split EP by Lee Ranaldo and Something to Burn, or the title song, 1992

=== Songs ===
- "Perfect Day" (Cascada song), 2009
- "Perfect Day" (EMF song), 1995
- "Perfect Day" (Jim Jones song), 2010
- "Perfect Day" (Lou Reed song), 1972; covered by many artists
- "A Perfect Day" (song), written by Carrie Jacobs-Bond, published 1910; recorded by many artists
- "Perfect Day", by Collective Soul from Blender, 2000
- "Perfect Day", by Harry Nilsson from Knnillssonn, 1977
- "Perfect Day", by Hoku, 2001
- "Perfect Day", by Kelis from Wanderland, 2001
- "Perfect Day", by Lady Antebellum from Need You Now, 2010
- "Perfect Day", by Miriam Stockley featured in The World of Peter Rabbit and Friends, 1992
- "Perfect Day", by Roxette from Joyride, 1991
- "Perfect Day", by Skin, 1996
- "Perfect Day", by the Suicide Machines from The Suicide Machines, 2000
- "A Perfect Day", by Cut Copy from Freeze, Melt, 2020
- "The Perfect Day", by Fischer-Z from Reveal, 1987

== Other uses ==
- Perfect Day (company), a startup creating milk proteins using microflora
- Perfect Day (USC), related to USC Trojans football and their rivals

== See also ==
- One Perfect Day (disambiguation)
- This Perfect Day, a 1970 novel by Ira Levin
- "This Perfect Day" (song), by the Saints, 1977
- Perfect Days (disambiguation)
  - Perfect Days, a 2023 film by Wim Wenders
