= The Reach Foundation =

Youth not-for-profit organisation

The Reach Foundation (Reach)
- Founded: 1994
- Founder: Jim Stynes and Paul Currie
- Purpose: Creating safe and supportive spaces where teenagers can share stories and experiences honestly.
- Location: Australia
- Region served: 10- to 18-year-olds
- Website: http://www.reach.org.au/

The Reach Foundation (Reach) is a youth not-for-profit organisation established by Jim Stynes OAM and film director Paul Currie in 1994.

Reach runs national school and community-based programs for young people aged 10 to 18 designed to promote their mental health and wellbeing. Programs are run by the young Reach "Crew" in over 500 metropolitan and regional schools and communities across Australia. The main focus is on prevention and early intervention. Programs aim to identify the underlying reasons for negative behaviour and enable young people to redirect their energy towards more positive outcomes.

In May 2026, Reach and the Youth Impact Foundation (TYIF) announced a merger to form a single organisation delivering prevention‑led youth mental health and wellbeing programs. The combined entity is expected to reach over 200,000 young people in 2026 across Australia and New Zealand.

== Working with teachers and youth professionals ==
Reach works in partnership with The Commonwealth Department of Education, Employment and Workplace Relations (DEEWR) to offer the Finding Heroes program to teachers, educators and youth professionals.

Finding Heroes is based on the positive psychology framework and aims to provide teachers, educators and youth professionals with the practical skills and resources to improve the emotional and social wellbeing of students.

== Working with indigenous communities ==
Reach works in partnership with DEEWR with the aim of creating relationships with young people in indigenous communities to encourage them to voice their concerns and aspirations for their lives.

== Locations ==
Reach programs are held at the Reach National Office ("The Dream Factory") in Collingwood (Victoria), Sydney, the Hunter Region (NSW), and in various other locations throughout Australia.

== Leadership ==
Trisha Squires commenced as CEO from 14 September 2015, taking over from Sarah Davies, who took the position in 2011 when Jim Stynes fell ill with cancer. Anthony Klein began his role as chairman of the board in 2020.

== Alumni ==
Reach Alumni include:

- Jules Lund, TV and radio personality
- Trisha Silvers, 2006 Young Australian of the Year
- Harley Webster aka Phrase, Hip hop MC
- Josh Schmidt Twentysomething, writer and actor
- Saskia Hempele TV personality, Neighbours
- Jess Harris Twentysomething, writer and actor
- Kayne Tremills ABC3, TV presenter
- Jordiie Leigh, Filmmaker, What Would You Do Australia (TV Series)

== The Open Book Project ==
The Open Book Project was a national campaign launched by Reach in 2011 that endeavoured to show today's teenagers that they're not alone in their lives. Celebrities and members of the general public shared pages of their teenage diary revisiting the thoughts, feelings and ambitions they had as a teenager.

Celebrity entries included Hamish Blake, Cathy Freeman, Kerry Armstrong and Jesse Martin.
