= 1984 All-Ireland Minor Football Championship =

Gaelic football competition

Championship details

All-Ireland Champions
- Winning team: Dublin (10th win)

All-Ireland Finalists
- Losing team: Tipperary

Provincial Champions
- Munster: Tipperary
- Leinster: Dublin
- Ulster: Derry
- Connacht: Roscommon

The 1984 All-Ireland Minor Football Championship was the 53rd staging of the All-Ireland Minor Football Championship, the Gaelic Athletic Association's premier inter-county Gaelic football tournament for boys under the age of 18.

Derry entered the championship as defending champions; however, they were defeated by Dublin in the All-Ireland semi-final.

On 23 September 1984, Dublin won the championship with a 1-9 to 0-4 victory of Tipperary in the All-Ireland final. This was their 10th All-Ireland title overall and their first in two championship seasons.

After this game, Jim Stynes, who was a part of the winning Dublin team, would go on to make his name in the Australian Football League playing for the Melbourne Football Club, whereby he would enter the Australian Football Hall of Fame as well as a slew of other impressive achievements within the code as a result of his involvement in the Melbourne Football Club's ambitious international recruitment program (now known as the "Irish experiment").

== Results ==
=== Connacht Minor Football Championship ===
Quarter-Final

| 20 May 1984 Quarter-Final | Leitrim | 1-10 to 1-7 | Sligo | Páirc Seán Mac Diarmada, Carrick-on-Shannon |
| | | | | Referee: J. Kearney (Roscommon) |

Semi-Finals

| 27 May 1984 Semi-Final | Roscommon | 1-6 to 1-2 | Galway | McHale Park, Castlebar |
| | | | | Referee: P. Egan (Leitrim) |

| 24 June 1984 Semi-Final | Leitrim | 1-8 to 1-16 | Mayo | McHale Park, Castlebar |
| | | | | Referee: P. Egan (Galway) |

Finals

| 8 July 1984 Final | Roscommon | 2-8 to 1-11 | Mayo | Pearse Stadium, Galway |
| | | | | Referee: S. Prior (Leitrim) |

| 22 July 1984 Final Replay | Roscommon | 3-9 to 2-8 | Mayo | McHale Park, Castlebar |
| | | | | Referee: S. Prior (Leitrim) |

=== Leinster Minor Football Championship ===
Preliminary Round

| May 1984 Preliminary Round | Wexford | 2-11 to 2-3 | Kilkenny | Nowlan Park, Kilkenny |

| May 1984 Preliminary Round | Westmeath | 1-10 to 0-6 | Meath | Cusack Park, Mullingar |

| May 1984 Preliminary Round | Laois | 1-10 to 0-4 | Carlow | Dr Cullen Park, Carlow |

| May 1984 Preliminary Round | Longford | 2-7 to 3-4 | Wicklow | Aughrim Park, Aughrim |

| May 1984 Preliminary Round Replay | Longford | 1-9 to 1-8 | Wicklow | Pearse Park, Longford |

Quarter-Finals

| June 1984 Quarter-Final | Westmeath | 1-7 to 1-3 | Louth | Cusack Park, Mullingar |

| June 1984 Quarter-Final | Dublin | 3-12 to 0-9 | Wexford | Parnell Park, Dublin |

| June 1984 Quarter-Final | Laois | 1-6 to 0-6 | Kildare | Dr Cullen Park, Carlow |

| June 1984 Quarter-Final | Longford | 2-8 to 0-11 | Offaly | Pearse Park, Longford |

Semi-Finals

| July 1984 Semi-Final | Dublin | 1-14 to 0-3 | Longford | O'Connor Park, Tullamore |

| July 1984 Semi-Final | Laois | 0-5 to 0-11 | Westmeath | O'Connor Park, Tullamore |

Final

| 29 July 1984 Final | Dublin | 0-12 to 1-6 | Westmeath | Croke Park, Dublin |

=== Munster Minor Football Championship ===
Semi-Finals

| June 1984 Semi-Final | Tipperary | 1-10 to 0-6 | Clare | Gaelic Grounds, Limerick |

| June 1984 Semi-Final | Waterford | 0-9 to 2-8 | Kerry | Cappoquin |

Final

| 1 July 1984 Final | Tipperary | 2-3 to 0-8 | Kerry | Fitzgerald Stadium, Killarney |

=== Ulster Minor Football Championship ===
Preliminary Round

| May 1984 Preliminary Round | Derry | 1-7 to 1-7 | Cavan | Breffni Park, Cavan |

| May 1984 Preliminary Round Replay | Derry | 0-11 to 0-6 | Cavan | Dean McGlinchey Park, Ballinascreen |

Quarter-Finals

| June 1984 Quarter-Final | Antrim | 1-6 to 1-5 | Monaghan | Casement Park, Belfast |

| June 1984 Quarter-Final | Down | 0-9 to 0-6 | Fermanagh | Pairc Esler, Newry |

| June 1984 Quarter-Final | Derry | 1-6 to 0-3 | Tyrone | Dean McGlinchey Park, Ballinascreen |

Semi-Finals

| June 1984 Semi-Final | Armagh | 1-6 to 0-6 | Antrim | Breffni Park, Cavan |

| June 1984 Semi-Final | Down | 0-3 to 0-5 | Derry | Casement Park, Belfast |

Final

| 15 July 1984 Final | Armagh | 0-3 to 1-4 | Derry | St. Tiernach's Park, Clones |

=== All-Ireland Minor Football Championship ===
Semi-Finals

| 12 August 1984 Semi-Final | Tipperary | 2-12 to 1-1 | Roscommon | Croke Park, Dublin |

| 19 August 1984 Semi-Final | Dublin | 0-14 to 0-7 | Derry | Croke Park, Dublin |

Final

| 23 September 1984 Final | Dublin | 1-9 to 0-4 | Tipperary | Croke Park, Dublin |

== Championship statistics ==
=== Miscellaneous ===
- Tipperary qualify for the All-Ireland final for the first time since 1955.
