= Real to Me (Lydia Denker song) =

2000 single by Lydia Denker

Single by Lydia Denker
- Released: 10 October 2000
- Recorded: 2000
- Genre: Pop
- Label: Gotham Records
- Songwriter: Merril Bainbridge
- Producer: 001 Productions

Lydia Denker singles chronology
"Real to Me" (2000)	"One Perfect Day" (2004)

"Real to Me" is a pop song written by Merril Bainbridge and recorded by Australian pop singer Lydia Denker and released as a CD single on 10 October 2000. The song had heavy radio play on 2Day FM and a remix featured on the Big Brother Season One compilation CD.

Despite this, the song did not chart on the ARIA charts.

== Track Listing ==
1. 1 Real To Me (Radio Edit)

Acoustic Guitar – Mark Domoney Co-producer – Owen Bolwell, Sam Melamed Mixed By – Tony Espie Producer – Siew Written By – Alex Farrugia, J. A. Cocivera, Merril Bainbridge, Owen Bolwell

1. 2 Real To Me (Barcelona Groove Mix)

Acoustic Guitar – Mark Domoney Co-producer – Owen Bolwell, Sam Melamed Producer – Siew Remix – P. Tan, Sam Melamed Written By – Alex Farrugia, J. A. Cocivera, Merril Bainbridge, Owen Bolwell

1. 3 Real To Me (Xtreme Bass Mix)

Acoustic Guitar – Mark Domoney Co-producer – Owen Bolwell, Sam Melamed Producer – Siew Remix – Sam Melamed Written By – Alex Farrugia, J. A. Cocivera, Merril Bainbridge, Owen Bolwell

1. 4 Real To Me (Phat Beatz Mix)

Acoustic Guitar – Mark Domoney Co-producer – Owen Bolwell, Sam Melamed Producer – Siew Remix – P. Tan Written By – Alex Farrugia, J. A. Cocivera, Merril Bainbridge, Owen Bolwell

1. 5 Real To Me (Astro Boyz Club Mix)

Acoustic Guitar – Mark Domoney Co-producer – Owen Bolwell, Sam Melamed Producer – Siew Remix – P. Tan Written By – Alex Farrugia, J. A. Cocivera, Merril Bainbridge, Owen Bolwell
