= Carlsbad Decrees =

Decree of 1819 suppressing German nationalism

The Carlsbad Decrees (German: Karlsbader Beschlüsse) were a set of reactionary restrictions introduced in the states of the German Confederation by resolution of its parliamentary body (the Bundesversammlung) on 20 September 1819 after a conference held in the spa town of Carlsbad, Austrian Empire. They banned nationalist fraternities ("Burschenschaften"), removed liberal university professors, and expanded the censorship of the press. They were aimed at quelling a growing sentiment for German unification and were passed during ongoing Hep-Hep riots which ended within a month after the resolution was passed.

== Background ==
The meeting of the states' representatives was called by the Austrian Minister of State Prince Klemens Wenzel von Metternich after the liberal Burschenschaft student Karl Ludwig Sand murdered the conservative writer August von Kotzebue on 23 March 1819, and an attempt had been made by apothecary Karl Löning on the life of Nassau president Karl von Ibell on 1 July 1819. In the course of the European Restoration, Metternich feared liberal and national tendencies at German universities which might conduct revolutionary activities threatening the monarchistic order. At this time, the two outrages cited were a welcome pretext to take action.

The Carlsbad Decrees had consequences not only for the rights of the member states but also for the independent academic jurisdiction that had been partially in existence for centuries. An important instrument for the application of the decrees for these and other purposes was the Mainz Central Investigation Commission (Mainzer Zentraluntersuchungskommission).

An essential attribute of the decrees was that the reactionary German Confederation understood liberal and nationalistic ideas as sedition and persecuted those spreading these ideas as demagogues. This persecution of demagogues, Demagogenverfolgung, was especially vigorous in Prussia.

After the Hambach Festival in 1832, the persecution was renewed for the last time. Only after the March Revolution of 1848 were the Carlsbad Decrees abrogated by the German Bundestag, on 2 April 1848.

== Text of the decrees ==
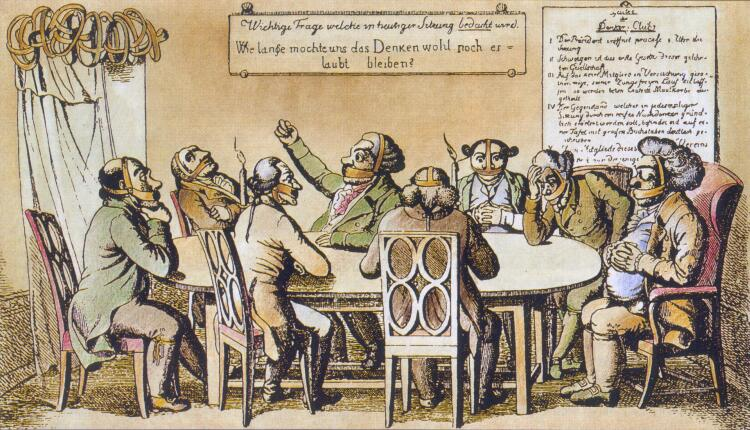
A contemporary lithograph mocking the new restrictions on the press and free expression imposed by the Carlsbad Decrees. The sign on the wall behind the table reads: "Important question to be considered in today's meeting: 'How long will we be allowed to think?'" The sign in the upper-right corner lists the rules of the Thinkers' Club: "I. The president opens the meeting at precisely 8 a.m./ II. The first rule of a learned society is silence./ III. So that no member, having made full use of his tongue, will end up in prison, muzzles will be distributed upon entry./ IV. The object of discussion, which through mature reflection should be thoroughly discussed at each meeting, will be clearly written in capital letters on a board."

The decrees effectively dissolved the Burschenschaft student associations and the student sports organizations and also provided for university inspectors and press censors. Reformers in many local governments were forced out, and by 1820 all significant liberal and nationalistic German reform movements had come to an end. The decrees were organized into three sections.

=== Student organizations ===
1. A special representative of the ruler of each state shall be appointed for each university, with appropriate instructions and extended powers, and shall reside in the place where the university is situated. This office may devolve upon the existing curator or upon any other individual whom the government may deem qualified. The function of this agent shall be to see to the strictest enforcement of existing laws and disciplinary regulations; to observe carefully the spirit which is shown by the instructors in the university in their public lectures and regular courses, and, without directly interfering in scientific matters or in the methods of teaching, to give a salutary direction to the instruction, having in view the future attitude of the students. Lastly, he shall devote unceasing attention to everything that may promote morality, good order, and outward propriety among the students.

2. The confederated governments mutually pledge themselves to remove from the universities or other public educational institutions all teachers who, by obvious deviation from their duty, or by exceeding the limits of their functions, or by the abuse of their legitimate influence over the youthful minds, or by propagating harmful doctrines hostile to public order or subversive of existing governmental institutions, shall have unmistakably proved their unfitness for the important office entrusted to them.

No teacher who shall have been removed in this manner shall be again appointed to a position in any public institution of learning in another state of the union.

3. Those laws which have for a long period been directed against secret and unauthorized societies in the universities shall be strictly enforced. These laws apply especially to that association established some years since under the name Universal Students' Union (Allgemeine Burschenschaft), since the very conception of the society implies the utterly unallowable plan of permanent fellowship and constant communication between the various universities. The duty of especial watchfulness in this matter should be impressed upon the special agents of the government.

The governments mutually agree that such persons as shall hereafter be shown to have remained in secret or unauthorized associations, or shall have entered such associations, shall not be admitted to any public office.

4. No student who shall be expelled from a university by a decision of the university senate which was ratified or prompted by the agent of the government, or who shall have left the institution in order to escape expulsion shall be received in any other university.

=== Press law ===
1. So long as this decree shall remain in force no publication which appears in the form of daily issues, or as a serial not exceeding twenty sheets of printed matter, shall go to press in any state of the union without the previous knowledge and approval of the state officials.

Writings which do not belong to one of the above-mentioned classes shall be treated according to the laws now in force, or which may be enacted, in the individual states of the union.

2. Each state of the union is responsible, not only to the state against which the offense is directly committed, but to the whole Confederation, for every publication appearing under its supervision in which the honor or security of other states is infringed or their constitution or administration attacked.

3. The Diet shall have the right, moreover, to suppress on its own authority, without being petitioned, such writings included in Article I, in whatever German state they may appear, as, in the opinion of a commission appointed by it, are inimical to the honor of the union, the safety of individual states, or the maintenance of peace and quiet in Germany. There shall be no appeal from such decisions, and the governments involved are bound to see that they are put into execution.

4. When a newspaper or periodical is suppressed by a decision of the Diet, the editor thereof may not within a period of five years edit a similar publication in any state of the union.

=== Investigating committee ===
1. Within a fortnight, reckoned from the passage of this decree, there shall convene, under the auspices of the Confederation, in the city and federal fortress of Mainz, an extraordinary commission of investigation to consist of seven members, including the chairman.

2. The object of the commission shall be a joint investigation, as thorough and extensive as possible, of the facts relating to the origin and manifold ramifications of the revolutionary plots and demagogical associations directed against the existing constitution and the internal peace both of the union and of the individual states; of the existence of which plots more or less clear evidence is to be had already, or may be produced in the course of the investigation.

...

10. The central investigating commission is to furnish the Diet from time to time with a report of the results of the investigation, which is to be carried out as speedily as possible.

== See also ==
- Zur Auflösung der Jenaer Burschenschaft: "Wir hatten gebauet ein stattliches Haus"
