= One Perfect Day (2004 film) =

- Directed by: Paul Currie
- Written by: Paul Currie; Chip Richards
- Produced by: Paul Currie; Phil Gregory
- Starring: Dan Spielman; Leeanna Walsman; Nathan Phillips; Dawn Klingberg
- Cinematography: Gary Ravenscroft
- Edited by: Amelia Ford; Gary Woodyard
- Music by: Josh G. Abrahams; David Hobson; Paul van Dyk; Matt Old-z
- Distributed by: Roadshow Entertainment (Australia)
- Release date: 19 February 2004
- Running time: 106 minutes
- Country: Australia

One Perfect Day is an Australian film released in 2004.

== Plot ==
The central character of the film is Tommy Matisse; his name combines the title of The Who's 1969 rock opera Tommy and the last name of twentieth century French painter Henri Matisse.

Tommy is a Melbourne boy studying at the Royal Academy of Music in London. He is a violinist and composer who hears music in unusual sources such as the ambient noises of a train in the London Underground or the chirping of crickets. He is a rebel against the traditions of classical music and displays this by bringing a homeless woman living in the Underground on stage for a concert.

A sympathetic professor decides that he is the type of innovative artist needed to revive a dying opera artform. Having shocked opera's establishment, he returns home to Melbourne on the death of his younger sister Emma, who suffers a fatal overdose after experimenting with drugs at a rave dance party. He discovers a CD of her own mixes and decides to enter the genre of electronic music to follow the path she was pursuing in the hopes of discovering more about his sister and how she became involved in this dance world. Emma's death acts as a catalyst that drives Tommy and his girlfriend Alysse apart. In despair, Alysse falls prey to a sleazy entrepreneur named Hector Lee who owns a club called Trance-Zen-Dance and who is also a drug dealer. Hector Lee has a young assistant called Trig who is a VJ, and is always getting new footage and talent.

== Cast ==
- Dan Spielman as Tommy Matisse
- Leeanna Walsman as Alysse Green
- Kerry Armstrong as Carolyn Matisse
- Abbie Cornish as Emma
- Rory Williamson as Noah
- Nathan Phillips as Trig
- Syd Brisbane as Hamish
- Frank Gallacher as Malcolm
- Alex Menglet as Bernard May
- Andrew Howard as Hector Lee
- Nathan Wentworth as Stevie
- Dawn Klingberg as Bag Lady
- Jay Smeaton as Party Dancer 2

== Crew ==
- Paul Currie – director & writer
- Chip Richards – writer
- David Hobson – original music score composer
- Paul van Dyk – additional music score

== Soundtrack ==
The soundtrack was released on 15 February 2004 by Universal Music, and debuted at number forty-six on the Australian album charts in the week beginning 23 February 2004 and manage to reach to number twenty-two. The title track, sung by Lydia Denker, debuted at number thirty-five on the Australian single charts. There are two versions of the soundtrack:

One-disc version track listing

1. "Blow Wind Blow" – Rairbirds
2. "Break It" (Down James Brown) – The Offcuts
3. "Krazy Krush" – Ms. Dynamite
4. "Crazy Beat" – Blur
5. "What Is the Problem" – Graffiti
6. "Don't Let the Man" – Fatboy Slim
7. "Are You Ready for Love" (Radioslave mix) – Elton John
8. "One Perfect Day" – Lydia Denker
9. "No One Knows" – Queens of the Stone Age
10. "Two Months Off" – Underworld
11. "Late at Night" – Futureshock
12. "All of Me" – Groove Armada
13. "Schoolgirl" – Sandrine
14. "Feathers and Down" – The Cardigans
15. "Hector's Demise" – Dust Brothers
16. "Ordinary World" (Josh G. Abrahams remix) – Mandy Kane
17. "Pictures of You" (Old-z remix) – after The Cure's 1989 album Disintegration
18. "One and the Same" (One Perfect Day Remix) – after Rob Dougan's 2002 album Furious Angels

=== Two-disc version track listing ===
Disc 1

1. "Blow Wind Blow" – Rairbirds
2. "Break It" (Down James Brown) (Josh G. Abrahams Remix) – The Offcuts
3. "Krazy Krush" – Ms. Dynamite
4. "What Is the Problem?" – Graffiti
5. "Don't Let the Man Get You Down" – Fatboy Slim
6. "Are You Ready for Love" (radio slave remix) – Elton John
7. "One Perfect Day" – Lydia Denker
8. "Pictures of You" (Paul Mac remix) – after The Cure's 1989 album Disintegration
9. "Two Months Off" – Underworld
10. "Late at Night" – Futureshock
11. "All of Me" – Groove Armada
12. "Schoolgirl" – Old-z
13. "Feathers and Down" – The Cardigans
14. "Hector's Demise" – The Dust Brothers
15. "No One Knows" (Unkle Remix) – Queens of the Stone Age
16. "Ordinary World" (Josh Abrahams remix) – Mandy Kane
17. "One and the Same" (One Perfect Day remix) – after Rob Dougan's 2002 album Furious Angels
18. "Design Music" – Sven Väth

Disc 2

1. "The Man with the Red Face" – Laurent Garnier
2. "Horsepower" – C. J. Bolland
3. "Graffiti Part Two" – Stereo MC's
4. "No Transmission" – Lhb
5. "To Know" – NuBreed
6. "Gorecki" – Lamb
7. "Just Show Me" – Grandadbob
8. "Sleepwalking" – Euroboy
9. "Sly-ed" – Man With No Name
10. "Drop Some Drums" – Old-z
11. "One Perfect Sunrise" – Orbital Featuring Lisa Gerrard
12. "One Perfect Day" (epic dance mix) – Ali Mcgregor
13. "Tv Screen Memories" – David Hobson and Lisa Gerrard
14. "Final Moments" – David Hobson
15. "One Perfect Day" (orchestral mix) – David Hobson & Orchestra
16. Ride – Helmut

== Box office ==
One Perfect Day grossed $1,152,011 at the box office in Australia.

== See also ==
- Cinema of Australia
