= Paul Currie (director) =

Australian director, producer and author

Paul Currie in 2010

Paul Currie (born 2 March 1968) is an Australian director, producer and author. His directorial work spans feature films and the staging of live events.

Currie directed and produced the 2004 feature film One Perfect Day, for which he was awarded Best Debut Director from the Screen Director's Association of Australia. He also produced the 1995 Australian action feature film Under the Gun and in 1997 co-authored the best selling book Heroes: A Guide to Realising Your Dreams. Currie directed the acclaimed 2000 documentary Lionheart: The Jesse Martin Story and also served as creative director for World Reconciliation Day, a live and filmed event that featured Nelson Mandela and Rubin Carter.

In 2005, Currie was nominated as Australian of the Year for co-founding a charity organization called The Reach Foundation. As the founder of the Elliot Currie Drama Studios in Melbourne.

== Filmography ==
- One Perfect Day (2004) – Director, producer, writer
- Hacksaw Ridge (2016) – Producer
- 2:22 (2017) – Director, producer
- Bleeding Steel (2017) – Producer
- The King's Daughter (2022) – Producer
- Ricky Stanicky (2024) - Producer
- Better Man (2024) - Producer
