= One Perfect Day (Lydia Denker song) =

Single by Lydia Denker

from the album One Perfect Day Soundtrack
- Released: 16 February 2004 (Australia)
- Genre: Pop rock
- Length: 4:04
- Label: Universal
- Songwriter(s): Phillip Buckle, David Hobson, Paul van Dyk
- Producer(s): Sam Melamed, Paul van Dyk

Lydia Denker singles chronology
"Real to Me" (2000)	"One Perfect Day" (2004)

"One Perfect Day" is a song written by Phillip Buckle, David Hobson, and Paul van Dyk and recorded by Australian singer Lydia Denker as the theme to the 2004 film One Perfect Day (2004). Produced by Sam Melamed, the song is a pop rock love song. It was released as a CD single and maxi single on 16 February 2004 (see 2004 in music) and was the only song released from the soundtrack.

== Music video ==
The music video for the song was directed by Paul Curry for Lightstream Films. It features minor video clips from the One Perfect Day film and shows Denker being chased by a man.

== Track listing ==
1. "One Perfect Day" – 4:04
2. "One Perfect Day" (Josh Abrahams remix) – 4:28
3. "One Perfect Day" (Paul Van Dyk epic dance mix 001) – 7:14
4. "One Perfect Day" (Quazimodo remix) – 6:59

== Charts ==
Chart (2004)	Peak position
Australia (ARIA)	35
