= Lydia Denker =

Australian-based pop singer-songwriter (born 1980)

- Born: Lydia Norma Denker; 25 December 1980 (age 45); Germany
- Origin: Melbourne, Australia
- Genres: Dance, pop
- Occupations: Singer-songwriter, photographer
- Instrument: Vocals
- Years active: 2000–present
- Label: Gotham/BMG

Lydia Norma Denker (born 25 December 1980, Germany) is an Australian-based pop singer-songwriter. Her second single, "One Perfect Day", was released in 2004, which peaked at No. 35 on the ARIA Singles Chart. In August 2006 Denker made the top 24 of the fourth season of Australian Idol, but did not advance to the top 12.

== Biography ==
Lydia Norma Denker was born in December 1980 in Germany and grew up in the town of Niedermittlau, Hesse. Her parents are Joseph and Jutta Denker, she has a son and she has a sister. When Denker was eight, her family moved to Melbourne. At the age of sixteen she signed with BMG's Gotham Records after Ross Fraser and Siew Ooi saw her performance at the Midnight Revue Show, Crown Casino.

Denker released her first single, "Real to Me" in October 2000, but it did not reach the ARIA Singles Chart top 50. It was co-written by Alex Farrugia, John Anthony Cocivera, Merril Bainbridge, and Owen Bolwell. "Real to Me (Barcelona groove remix)" appeared on the various artists compilation album, Big Brother – The Album: Music Inspired By (June 2001).

Her second single, "One Perfect Day", followed in February 2004, which reached No. 35. It also peaked at No. 7 on the related ARIA Australasian Artists Singles Chart. "One Perfect Day" was the title single from the soundtrack of the film of the same name (February 2004). The single was written by David Hobson and Phil Buckle and includes remixes by Radio Slave and dance music DJ-producer, Josh Abrahams.

=== Australian Idol: 2006 ===
In August 2006 Denker made the top 24 of the fourth season of Australian Idol, but did not advance to the top 12. She was eliminated on "Episode 10: Semi Finals: Group 3 Verdict & Group 4 Perform", where she performed a cover version of "One Moment in Time" – originally by Whitney Houston.

==== Performances ====
Round	Song	Original artist	Result
Semi-Final 4	"One Moment in Time"	Whitney Houston	Eliminated

=== Later work ===
In 2012 Denker released her debut extended play, Voices, along with the related single, "Voices (In Your Head)". In 2013 it was re-released in a remixed (by DJ Argonaut) form.

Outside of her musical career Denker is also a professional photographer.

== Discography ==
=== Extended plays ===
Title	Album details	Peak chart positions
Title	Album details	AUS
Voices	Released: 30 December 2012; Formats: Digital download; Label: Independent	—

=== Singles ===
Title	Year	Peak chart positions	Album
Title	Year	AUS	Album
"Real to Me"	2000	—	Non-album single
"One Perfect Day"	2004	35	One Perfect Day Soundtrack
"Voices (In Your Head)"	2012	—	Voices (EP)
"Voices (DJ Argonaut vs. Lydia Denker Remix)"	2013	—	Non-album single
"—" denotes releases that did not chart.
