= Denk (band) =

Austrian rock band

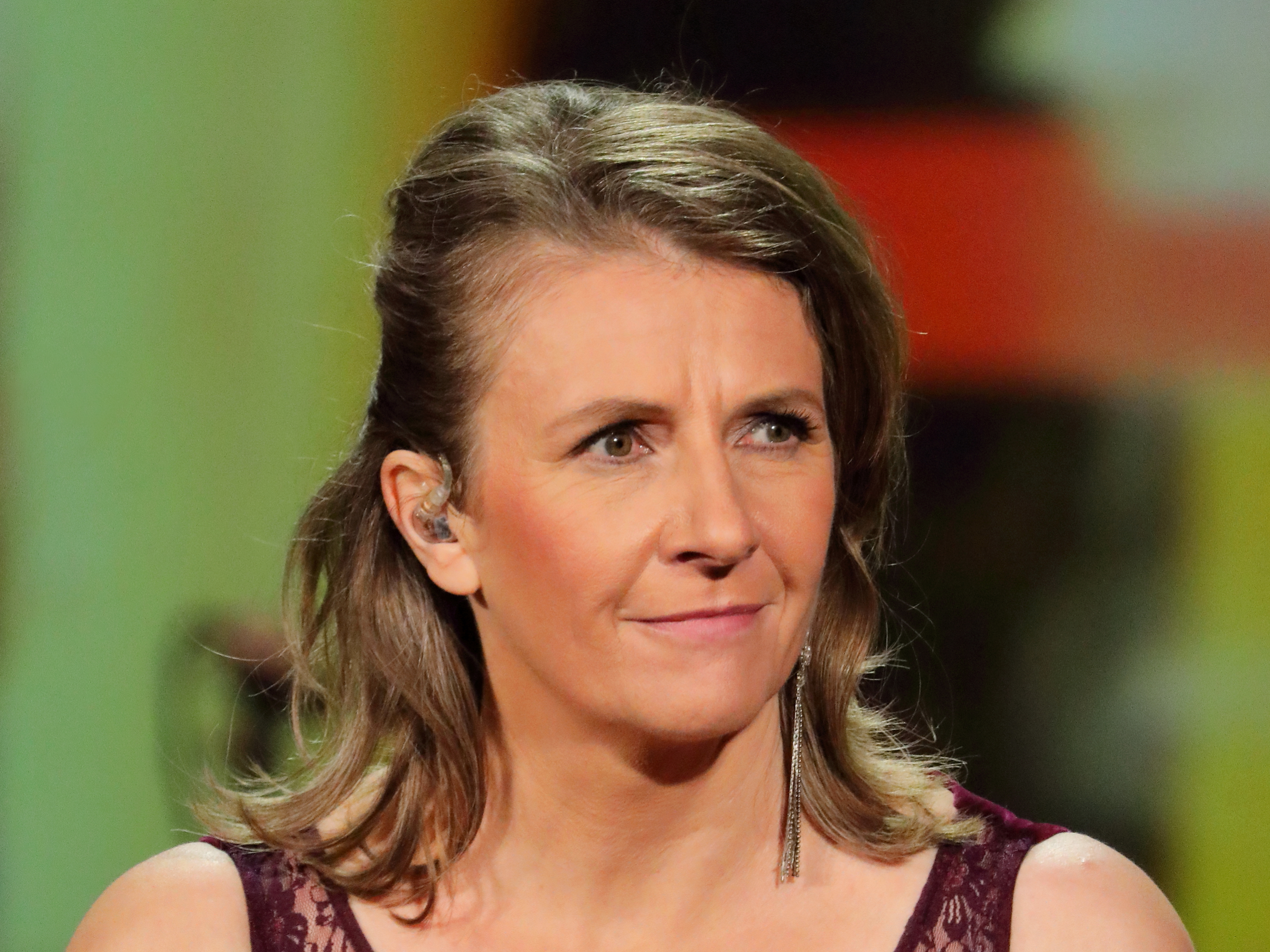
- Birgit Denk, Vienna 2019

Background information
- Origin: Austria
- Genres: Rock, Punk
- Members: Birgit Denk; Alex Horstmanm (bass); Thomas Tinhof ("Titi", guitar); Ludwig Ebner (guitar); Robert Baumgartner (drummer); Philipp Mayer (drummer); Harald Wiesinger (keyboard)

Denk (after Birgit Denk, self-styled as DENK) is an Austrian rock band from Schwechat near Vienna, formed around the lead singer Birgit Denk, who writes the band's lyrics in Viennese dialect.

They offer two different kinds of live shows: fully amplified rock-shows, with electric guitars, bass, drums, keyboards and vocals, and unplugged shows, in which they use acoustic instruments, including guitars, double bass, mandolin, and bouzouki

== History ==
Their first maxi single was self-titled and had five tracks. They played in locations like the Wiener Reigen and the Chelsea. Their first big success came after their first album Ausgesteckt, a live CD of an acoustic concert.

They released their second album Hoits eich an! (Listen to this!) in 2004. This was a studio recording, this time with electric guitars (they called it "wild & dangerous"). There are also two covers in this release, that Birgit Denk translated into the Viennese dialect.

After their second release, Denk held concerts that continued to draw bigger crowds, whose highlights included playing with S.T.S. and headlining at Donauinselfest. In 2006, Denk was nominated for two Amadeus Austrian Music Awards.

In 2006 Laut was released, Denk toured Germany and Austria and held two concerts in Rappoltenkirchen. On 9 March 2007, the album and DVD Ausgesteck in Rappoltkirchen were released. The DVD featured recordings from the two concerts in November 2006 in Pezihaus Rappoltenkirchen. In 2008 the band went on tour again for their Es is guad (It's good) tour. On this tour they played a combination of electric and acoustic shows. In 2010, the studio album "Tua weida" was released in celebration of the band's tenth anniversary.

== Discography ==
- 2001: Denk (Studio maxi single with Hoanzl)
- 2003: Ausgsteckt (Live-unplugged with Musica)
- 2004: Hoits eich au (Studio album with Universal)
- 2006: Laut (Studio album with Universal)
- 2007: Ausgsteckt in Rappoltenkirchen (Live unplugged CD and live DVD with Universal)
- 2010: Tua weida (Studio album with Pate Records)
- 2011: "Schoff da an Goaten au" (title song for the TV series Der wilde Gärtner)

Birgit Denk can also be heard on albums by Kurt Ostbahn, Alkbottle, Slow Club, Naca 7, Rudl, Beckermeister, and Gert Steinbäcker.
