= The Thinkers Club =

19th century German cartoon

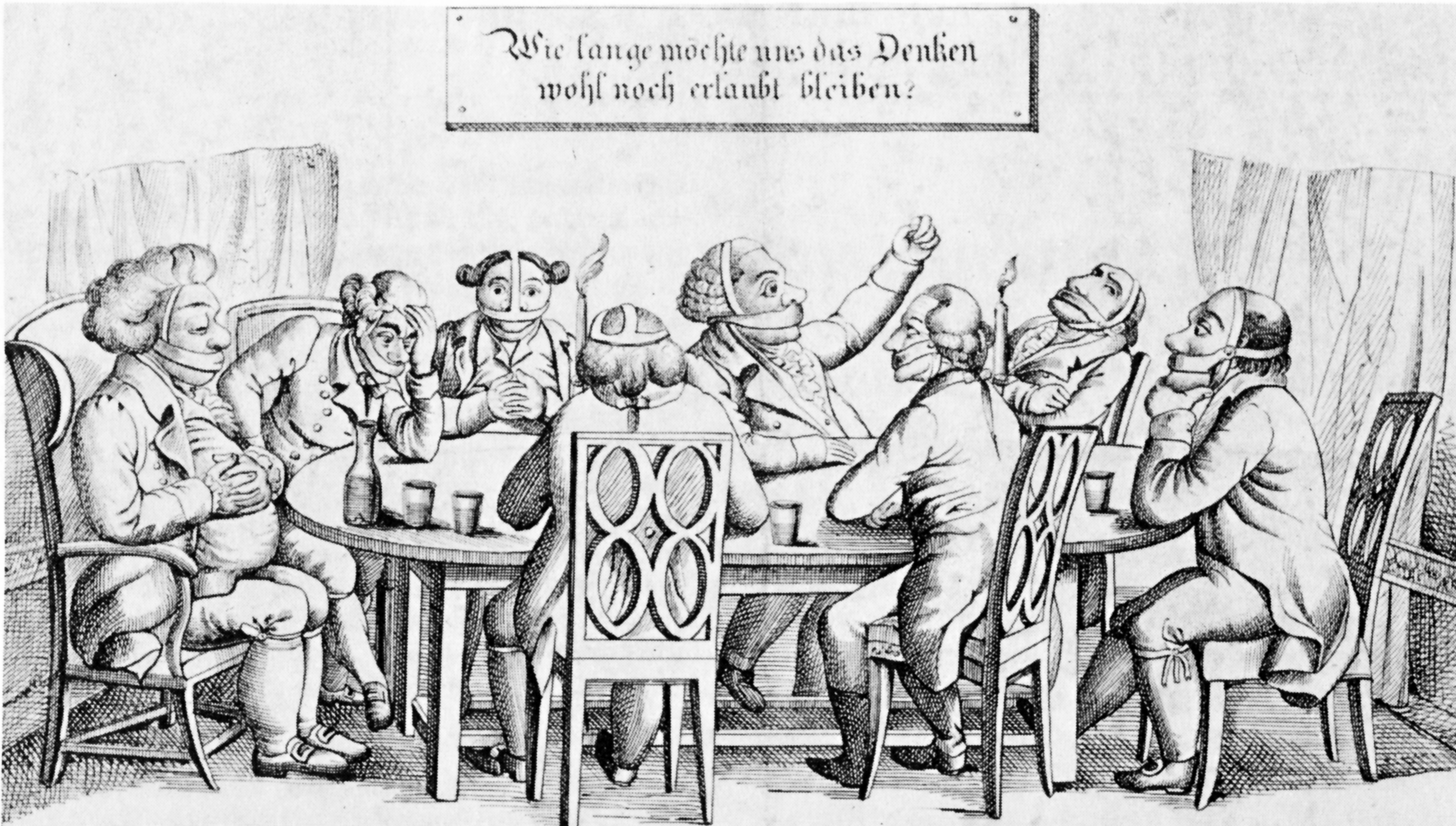
One version of the cartoon.

The Thinkers Club (German: Der Denker-Club) was a cartoon based on a fictitious group of professors and scholars which was popularized throughout the German Confederation in 1819.

The cartoon depicts the suppression of freedom of expression within the German Confederation of 39 states under the Carlsbad Decrees, which stipulated for rigorous surveillance and censorship of universities following a surge in student violence and radicalism. The plaque on the left bears the inscription: "The most important question of today's meeting: how long will thinking be allowed to us?"

== Interpretation ==
The "club" is representative of all the clubs and societies that emerged at that point. The eight professors on the caricature are muzzled, which points out the radical nature of the mentioned political system. They were deprived of the right of expressions, as their written works were forbidden because of the press censorship. Therefore, the intellectuals are left only with their right of thought and prudently pose the question, how long they will still be allowed to think.

== Description ==
The plaque on the left bears the inscription:'The most important question of today's meeting: How long will thinking be allowed to us?'

The board on the right lists the rules of the Club which include the following:

1. The club’s president opens the meeting at exactly at 8 o‘clock (8:00) preciecely.

2. Silence is the first commandment of this learned society.

3. To avoid the eventuality whereby a member of this club may succumb to the temptation of speech, muzzles will be distributed to members upon entering'.
