= Nils Dencker =

Swedish mathematician (born 1953)

Nils Jonas Dencker (born 14 December 1953 in Lund) is a Swedish mathematician. Dencker earned his doctorate from Lund University in 1981 under supervision of Lars Hörmander, and is a professor of mathematics at Lund University. From 1981 until 1983, he was the C. L. E. Moore instructor at the Massachusetts Institute of Technology.

He won the 2005 Clay Research Award for his proof of the Nirenberg–Treves conjecture.

Dencker has been a member of the Royal Swedish Academy of Sciences since 2008. He was an invited speaker at the European Congress of Mathematics in Amsterdam in 2008, and at the International Congress of Mathematicians in Hyderabad, India, in 2010. In 2012 he became a fellow of the American Mathematical Society.
