= Eddington Transport Report =

Study undertaken in Victoria, Australia

The Eddington Transport Report was a major transport study undertaken in Victoria, Australia, by infrastructure consultant Sir Rod Eddington to propose improvements to transport links between the eastern and western suburbs of Melbourne. The report, titled "Investing in Transport–East West Link Needs Assessment", was commissioned in 2006 by the Government of Victoria following the model of the Eddington Transport Study in the United Kingdom and was released in April 2008. Eddington's report recommended new road and rail tunnels, further rail network electrification and improved cycle and bus routes in a bid to reduce congestion. Some of the report's recommendations were implemented by the Brumby Labor government, but many others remained unfunded.

== Background ==
In May 2006, the Victorian Government announced that as part of its "Meeting Our Transport Challenges" action plan, it had appointed Eddington, who was then reviewing Britain's transport system for the Blair Government, to head an independent investigation into the best transport solutions for connecting Melbourne's eastern and western suburbs. The government's brief noted that the majority of east–west traffic in the city was carried on just two links, the Monash and Eastern freeways, which were both heavily congested at peak periods. The corridor and surrounding arterial roads were under heavy pressure from strong suburban expansion and rapid growth in freight transport from the Port of Melbourne. The brief said the Monash-CityLink route was expected to reach full capacity within 20 years. It also highlighted the need for improvements to public transport, including increased cross-town bus services and a boost to rail capacity.

== Findings ==
Eddington's study noted that Melbourne's strong economic and population growth would result in a 30 percent increase in demand for travel, by both public transport and private motor vehicles, by 2033. There would also be a 50 percent growth in freight being moved around Melbourne and to and from the city's ports and airports by 2020. He said it was vital that there were higher levels of investment in public transport as well as the development of urban areas that were conducive to walking and cycling. But he added: "The evidence is clear that the number of trips made by car in Melbourne will increase by a substantial amount for the foreseeable future–and the city’s road network must be able to cope with this increasing demand in an efficient and sustainable manner."

He said any transport proposals arising from the study had to make a major contribution to:

- Improving opportunities in Melbourne's west and supporting the strong population growth taking place there. He said the city had a significant east–west divide that led to reduced opportunities for jobs and business growth in the west.
- Supporting the growth and consolidation of Melbourne's "knowledge centre" around Carlton and the Parkville precinct, whose research institutes, teaching hospitals and universities would be critical to Victoria's leadership in biotechnology, medical research, health services and education.

Eddington said he had avoided a "road vs rail" approach to transport planning, seeking the right combination of modes that offered the best options for meeting Melbourne's east–west transport needs over the next 30 years.

He said "retro-fitting" large-scale transport projects into a city the size of Melbourne would cause unavoidable short-term disruption, but would produce long-term benefits. He concluded: "Doing nothing is not an option. The cost of improving these transport connections is substantial – but the cost of inaction is far greater."

== Summary of recommendations ==
The report contained 20 recommendations including:

- Planning work should begin for a staged construction of a new 17 km Melbourne Metro rail tunnel to link western and south-eastern suburbs and provide a major increase to the rail network.
- An early start should be made on building a new rail connection from Werribee to Sunshine to improve the frequency and reliability of services from Werribee, Geelong, Ballarat and Bendigo.
- Planning work should begin on the staged construction of a new 18 km cross-city road connecting the Eastern Freeway with the western suburbs.
- Community amenity in the inner west should be restored by implementing a Truck Action Plan to remove truck traffic from local streets in the inner west, including road improvements that form an effective bypass around residential areas, reinforced by local truck bans.
- The Doncaster Area Rapid Transport (DART) upgrade announced in the 2006 "Meeting Our Transport Challenges" plan, incorporating high quality bus services, additional bus priority measures and a major new bus-rail interchange at Victoria Park station in Abbotsford.
- Additional links should be built to improve cross-city cycle connections.
- The Victorian Government should work with local councils to escalate citywide implementation and enforcement of priority measures for trams and buses.
- A fund should be established to develop Park and Ride facilities.
- The Government should take action to increase rail's share of freight.
- A single statutory authority should be created to deliver the Eddington plan's recommended projects.

The cost of the proposals was estimated at over A$18 billion.

== Implementation ==
The Brumby government released its final decisions in the Victorian Transport Plan. The plan did not include one of Eddington's proposal, the 18 km east–west road link, and instead proposed to build what later became known as North East Link to connect the M80 Ring Road to the Eastern Freeway, first proposed in the 1969 Melbourne Transportation Plan, including a tunnel through Greensborough. The government did, however, pursue some of Eddington's ideas as part of the plan, including the first stage of a new cross-city rail tunnel and the Port of Melbourne freight road tunnel, requesting funding from the federal government's Infrastructure Australia statutory funding body.

In January 2011, the newly elected Baillieu coalition government announced that the Victorian Transport Plan had been shelved while all projects were re-evaluated. It released its own infrastructure priority list later that year, expanding its east–west roading proposals to the full 18 km from the Eastern Freeway to the Western Ring Road as proposed by Eddington. It also sought federal funding to boost the capacity of the Dandenong railway line and remove 10 railway level crossings in Melbourne.
