= East West Link (Melbourne) =

Toll freeway proposal

East West Link Victoria

General information
- Type: Freeway (Proposed)
- Length: 18 km (11 mi)

Major junctions
- East end: Eastern Freeway; Clifton Hill, Melbourne
- CityLink
- West end: Western Ring Road; Sunshine West, Melbourne

Location(s)
- Major suburbs / towns: Clifton Hill, Collingwood, Fitzroy North, Carlton, Parkville, Flemington, Kensington, Footscray, Tottenham, Derrimut, Sunshine West

Highway system
- Highways in Australia; National Highway • Freeways in Australia; Highways in Victoria

The East West Link was a proposed 18-kilometre tollway in Melbourne, Australia, to connect the Eastern Freeway at Clifton Hill with the Western Ring Road at Sunshine West. The Napthine Coalition Government signed a $5.3 billion contract with the East West Connect consortium in September 2014, just prior to the November 2014 state election, to begin construction on the eastern tunnel segment of the project. It became one of the central issues in the election, and a subsequent change in government led to the project's cancellation at a cost of $1.1 billion. The problem of poor "connectivity between Melbourne's Eastern Freeway and CityLink" has since been included in Infrastructure Australia's list of Australia's 32 "highest priority" infrastructure needs and remains part of long-term state road planning.

The project's $6 billion first stage was planned as a 4.4 km tunnel from Hoddle Street, Clifton Hill to CityLink at Parkville, due for completion by early 2020. Work on the second stage, the western section between Parkville and the Western Ring Road, was expected to commence in late 2015 and be completed by 2023. The project's total cost was estimated at $15 to $17 billion.

The road project was proposed in 1999 by then Premier Jeff Kennett, but gained prominence when it became one of the chief recommendations of the 2008 East West Link Needs Assessment report, which warned that steady growth in port freight and population growth was rapidly taking Melbourne roads to capacity. The report's author, Sir Rod Eddington, said an alternative river crossing was also imperative to lessen the city's dependence on the West Gate Bridge, while an additional east–west link was needed to the city's north because of capacity constraints on the congested Monash-CityLink-West Gate corridor. Eddington said the benefits for the city included relieving congestion on Hoddle Street, reducing east–west rat running through suburban streets, assisting north–south traffic flows including public transport, and improving accessibility to city jobs for western suburbs residents.

The proposed freeway standard road was to start at the Western Ring Road at Laverton North, connect with Market Road, Brooklyn, then descend into two separate three-lane tunnels at Kingsville, to link with the Eastern Freeway. On-ramps and off-ramps were expected to be provided near Dynon Road, Footscray for port access, and at its junction with CityLink and the Eastern Freeway.

The project attracted public criticism over its effectiveness to reduce congestion, prioritisation ahead of public transport, transparency of business case and local effect on Royal Park and Melbourne Zoo. Local councils and public transport advocates opposed the project and several community groups were formed to block its construction.

In 2013, then Opposition Leader Daniel Andrews criticised and campaigned against the project, promising to abandon the project if Labor won government at the 2014 state election. The then Labor opposition said that part of the project's western section may still be built, though not in the government's first term. After winning office and subsequently cancelling the project, the new Labor government initially proposed its West Gate Distributor as a lower-cost port link for heavy freight vehicles, but in early 2015 unveiled plans by infrastructure company Transurban to build the multibillion-dollar West Gate Tunnel project as a more expansive route, providing a second major river crossing and a partial western bypass in the city's inner west. This alternative project began construction in early 2018 and was originally expected to be complete in 2022. However, due to financial difficulties and lengthy delays, the West Gate Tunnel was not opened until December 2025.

In November 2017, the Coalition Opposition in Victoria, led by Opposition Leader Matthew Guy, pledged to build the former project combined with the proposed North East Link if it won government at the 2018 state election. Following an upset victory for the Coalition at the 2019 federal election, then-Prime Minister Scott Morrison offered $4 billion to build the eastern section of the project and $3 billion from the private sector, despite the Labor state government refusing to build the project. After the Coalition lost the 2022 federal election, the new Labor federal Government led by Prime Minister Anthony Albanese confirmed they would not fund the project, and that the funding "set aside" by the previous Government did not exist. Funding was instead committed to the proposed Suburban Rail Loop rapid transit system.

== Background ==
A proposal for a freeway network in the inner north of Melbourne first emerged in a 1954 strategic plan prepared by the Melbourne and Metropolitan Board of Works. The MMBW report noted "the lack of convenient roads... to make journeys between various suburbs... without travelling towards or through the city centre", and proposed as a solution a series of orbital controlled-access roads at different distances from the CBD. One of these, numbered Route 2, extended from Hoddle Street in the inner north-east to the beginnings of Geelong Road and Ballarat Road in the west. The report called it "perhaps the most important of these inner-suburban routes".

However, it was the 1969 Melbourne Transportation Plan, prepared by a committee that included the city's major transport authorities – the MMBW, the Country Roads Board, the Melbourne and Metropolitan Tramways Board, the Victorian Railways – which was to have the greatest impact on the design of the city's freeway network. The plan, based on American planning practices, envisaged a vast system of freeways connected with new and widened arterial roads at a total length of more than 900 kilometres (560 mi) and a cost of over A$2.2 billion. Among the roads proposed were the Eastern Freeway from the suburbs to the inner north, and a connection from the Eastern to the western suburbs along Alexandra Parade.

However, the plan's freeway construction program would have required the compulsory acquisition of an enormous number of inner-city properties, and its publication coincided with a swelling of anti-freeway sentiment, led by academics from the University of Melbourne and residents of the inner suburbs. In 1973, under increasing political pressure, the government led by Premier Rupert Hamer "pruned" the inner-city elements of the planned network; nevertheless, and despite continued public protest, the Eastern Freeway was constructed eastwards from Hoddle Street and opened in 1977. In the aftermath of the Hamer government's concession, leaders of the CRB, which later became VicRoads, urged their planners to continue to advocate for "...the concept of building inner-city freeways."

== History ==
=== Kennett government ===
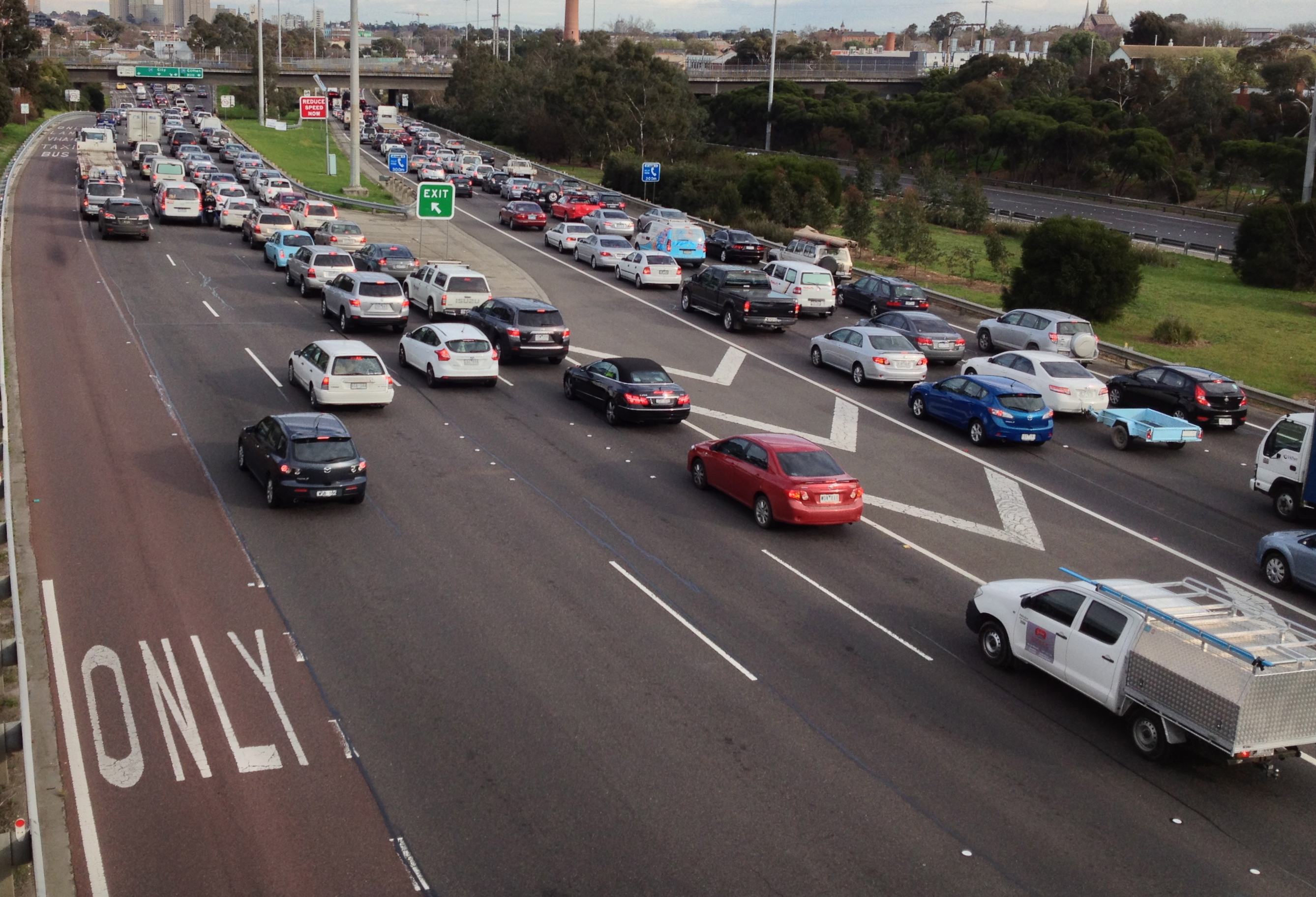
Traffic approaches the city end of the Eastern Freeway, Melbourne, where the East West Link would have begun. Vehicles queue to turn into Hoddle Street (left lanes) or continue west to Alexandra Parade (right lanes).

In the 1990s, the state government under Premier Jeff Kennett began its CityLink scheme: a Western Bypass and Southern Bypass, linking the Tullamarine Freeway, West Gate Freeway, and South Eastern Freeway, all of which had converged to "dead ends" in the city centre. The project, conceived as a Build–Own–Operate–Transfer partnership in which a private consortium would pay for the construction and upkeep of the road, was to have a significant impact on the structure of the city's transport network, as existing roads were regulated to encourage traffic on to the new tollways for the benefit of the consortium. Critics of the scheme argued that it was a full-scale revival of the 1969 plan, but political opposition proved insufficient to unseat the Kennett government at the 1996 election, and so it went ahead.

In 1997, with construction underway, the CityLink consortium, by then known as Transurban, publicly stated its interest in building more inner-urban roads, and named a link between the Eastern Freeway and the Tullamarine as one of its preferred options. By 1998, the consortium claimed that the "logical" project had support within the state government, and suggested that work could start immediately following the completion of CityLink, and be supplemented by an "upgrade" of Punt Road and Hoddle Street to complete an "inner ring" of freeways. Then, following his 1999 budget, Kennett announced a plan for a second privately financed scheme to link the Eastern Freeway to the Tullamarine, near the start of CityLink. Because the route travelled along sensitive areas including densely populated inner suburbs, the Melbourne General Cemetery and the large Royal Park, it was proposed as a tunnel for its entire length. However, Kennett lost the election later that year, partly due to voter concerns about tolls and delays on the remainder of the CityLink project.

=== Bracks government ===
The new ministry under Premier Steve Bracks did not immediately commit to a position on the Eastern–Tullamarine link. Instead, it directed the Department of Infrastructure to conduct a Northern Central City Corridor Study to examine options for transport in the area, including the possibility of a tunnel along the entire route. However, Bracks had promised in opposition not to build toll roads, limiting the options for financing the project. While the study was underway, lobby groups including the Melbourne Chamber of Commerce and an Infrastructure Planning Council commissioned by the government recommended construction of the link.

The Northern Central City Corridor Study released its final report in late 2003. It found that "[a]n east-west tunnel is the only real way of removing through traffic (including trucks) from Royal Park, but it is costly and gives low economic returns." A detailed assessment costed the project at $810 million, and found it would substantially reduce traffic on Alexandra Parade, but also noted that only 25% of Eastern Freeway traffic was attempting to bypass the CBD. The government announced in response it would not develop the link "in the foreseeable future."

In the following years, Transurban continued to support the road, which it called the Northern Tunnel, and argued it should be completed in tandem with a second crossing of the Yarra River, which it said was necessary to take pressure off the West Gate Bridge. Then, in 2005, an infrastructure strategy prepared by the City of Melbourne adopted the East–West Integrated Transport Proposal, codenamed "the Big Idea". In addition to the tunnel between the Eastern and Tullamarine freeways that had been supported by other lobby groups, the council's proposal advocated for a second stage from the Tullamarine interchange to the Western Ring Road at Deer Park. Although it faced immediate criticism from public transport and environment advocates, as well as from within the council, the combined project gained support with other lobby groups and the state government.

As the 2006 election approached, the state government refused to commit to any part of the project, and did not include it in a 20-year transport plan released that May.

=== Brumby government ===
The project became one of the key recommendations of the 2008 East-West Link Needs Assessment report by Sir Rod Eddington. Eddington identified two possible routes to link the Eastern Freeway with Melbourne's western suburbs, both of which formed an alternative to the West Gate Bridge and provided connections to the port and CityLink. He identified a single alignment from the Eastern Freeway to the port area—under Alexandra Parade, Princes Street and Royal Park—and two possible routes from the port to the western suburbs:

- A tunnel under Footscray and the Maribyrnong River along the general alignment of Buckley Street and Sunshine Road to connect Dynon Road with the Deer Park Bypass; or
- An elevated road over the Maribyrnong River linking Dynon Road with the West Gate Freeway near Williamstown Road.

Both options would include a major interchange in the port precinct.

Eddington's report noted that although the sequencing of the full connection was a decision for government, he believed the most urgent need was the section from the inner west to the port, providing an alternative to the West Gate Bridge—"a tunnel under, or a bridge over, the Maribyrnong River, connecting to a northern bypass of the city." He concluded: "The evidence is clear: doing nothing is not an option. Melbourne needs better east-west transport connections to address core congestion problems within the transport network, to meet rapidly increasing travel demand, to support a growing population and to keep pace with the changes taking place in the city's economic and urban structure."

Releasing the report, Premier John Brumby said he was neither "ruling anything in nor ruling anything out" among Eddington's 20 key proposals. In December 2008 the Brumby Labor government released its Victorian Transport Plan, which included a commitment to start work on the western end of Eddington's overall proposal: building an alternative to the West Gate Bridge—"a new tunnel from Geelong Rd/Sunshine Rd to Dynon Rd/Footscray Rd in the Port of Melbourne precinct." The tunnel, which became known as Westlink, was costed at $2.5 billion and Brumby described it as the transport plan's top priority, with construction due to start about 2013. He said plans for the 18 km tunnel had been dumped, and that improved public transport to Doncaster would achieve better results for eastern suburban commuters. In July 2010 the Victorian Government established the Linking Melbourne Authority, which investigated a series of route options for the Westlink tunnel project before releasing a preferred route in October 2010. A month later, the Brumby government was defeated and replaced by the Ted Baillieu-led coalition government; in January 2011 new Transport Minister Terry Mulder announced the Labor government Transport Plan had been shelved, with all its recommendations to undergo re-evaluation.

=== Baillieu and Napthine governments ===
In May 2012 the Baillieu government was reported to be "red hot" about making a start on the project, which would rival CityLink and the railway City Loop in its scope. On 7 May 2013, new Premier Denis Napthine announced the Government was committing to fund stage one of the project. In a media release, Napthine said the project would "reduce chronic congestion issues and transform east west travel across Melbourne".

The Government pledged to have the design finalised and construction contracts signed by September 2014 to ensure construction was under way in October, before the state election on 29 November. A shortlist of companies tendering for the work was released in late September 2013. They were:

- East West Connect Consortium: Capella Capital, Lend Lease, Acciona and Bouygues
- Inner Link Group Consortium: Cintra, Rest Super, Samsung C&T Corporation, Ferrovial, Ghella, Transfield Services and Macquarie Capital
- Momentum Infrastructure Consortium: John Holland, Dragados Australia, Leighton Contractors, Iridium Concesiones de Infraestructuras and the Bank of Tokyo

The companies submitted their bids for the work in April 2014, three months before the conclusion of a community consultation process. In June 2014, Momentum abandoned its bid, claiming the geotechnical risks associated with building the tunnel were "not acceptable", leaving only East West Connect and Inner Link in the bidding race, and, in September, East West Connect was named as the sole preferred bidder.

Geotechnical drilling of the route began in May 2012 but, in late September 2013, the drilling began to be disrupted by protesters. Picketing continued in 2014, with protesters targeting one of the 16 drilling sites each day. According to the State Government policing costs as result of the protests amounted to $1.6 million by late January 2014.

In April 2014, the project was challenged in the Supreme Court of Victoria, with the claim that the government had made "misleading representations" about the benefits of the project. The court dismissed the challenge on 10 September 2014.

On 30 June, planning Minister Matthew Guy announced he had approved the project with some modifications, deleting the Elliott Avenue interchange and instead including access to Flemington Road. The change would spare much of Royal Park grounds. A month later, Yarra Council voted to join with Moreland Council and issue a legal challenge to the decision of the Planning Minister, arguing that the approval was invalid and "infected by jurisdictional error" because the planning process had been flawed. In August, the Supreme Court of Victoria set 15 December 2014, two months after the date when construction contracts were expected to be signed, as the starting date for the trial. The Moonee Valley Council joined the action in November. By August, a third legal challenge to the East West Link was also under way, with Labor's shadow road minister, Luke Donnellan, pursuing the Government in the Victorian Civil and Administrative Tribunal to force the release of the project business case.

In September 2014, state Opposition Leader, Daniel Andrews, said that if Labor won power in the November election it would support the Supreme Court action by Yarra and Moreland councils rather than defend the project, thus making the councils' legal challenge more likely to succeed and effectively terminating the project. Andrews said Labor had obtained legal advice that if the court declared invalid the Planning Minister's decision to approve the project, "any contracts entered into will be beyond power and unenforceable". On 29 September 2014, the government signed a $5.3 billion contract with the East West Connect consortium to build the road.

However, in the light of the decision by the opposition Labor Party to scrap the project if it was elected, the consortium had been considering abandoning its bid. As a result, the Coalition government provided it with a hastily drafted "side letter" promising that, if the project was not proceeded with, the state government would compensate the consortium to the extent that it was no worse off financially. Consequently, if Labor won the forthcoming election and abandoned the project, the state would be forced to make a payout of hundreds of millions of dollars to the consortium.

A week before the November election, Andrews said an "East West Link-type connection" could still be built under a Labor government if it was recommended by Infrastructure Victoria, an independent advisory board Labor planned to set up if it won government. The day after Labor's win in the 2014 state election, Andrews confirmed that the East West Link would be abandoned in favour of its $300 million alternative, the West Gate Distributor. However, the government left open the option of proceeding with the western section of the original road plan.

=== Andrews government ===
On 12 December Andrews ordered the East West Connect consortium to stop work on the project immediately, prompting Infrastructure Australia to abandon an assessment of the full business case for the first stage of the project.

In January 2015 the Victorian Government announced it was negotiating with East West Connect on the cost of dissolving the contracts. Speculation rose that the costs of terminating the contracts could pass $1.1 billion, but the Andrews government denied the claim and threatened to pass legislation to overturn compensation provisions in the contract if a compromise could not be reached. Prime Minister Tony Abbott criticised the Andrews government's stance, telling the National Press Club: "Surely, it is the very midsummer of madness to pay $1.2 billion not to build a road ... I can't think of anything more crazy than spending $1.2 billion not to build a road, given that the Victorian government's contribution, after the federal government's contribution, after road users' contribution, after the private investors' contribution, was probably only going to be $1.5 billion in the first place."

A group of federal Liberal MPs from Melbourne's outer eastern suburbs announced in January 2015 it would launch a public campaign, with billboards, advertising and social media, to lobby for the road's construction and in April two federal MPs from Geelong, Sarah Henderson and Andrew Katos, launched a "Just Build It" campaign and petition, claiming that stage two of the project should be fast-tracked for the sake of jobs and the Geelong economy. Katos said the "shovel-ready" East West Link would remove 50,000 vehicles a day from the West Gate Bridge compared with 5000 if the West Gate Distributor was eventually built.

On 15 April 2015 the government announced the road project would not proceed and said it had reached agreement with East West Connect to pay the consortium $339 million to cover costs it had incurred to that point. Andrews said the government had acquired the consortium for $1. The decision was condemned by Abbott as "reckless" and said Victorians would suffer as a result. Abbott said: "The East West Link is the only answer. Tens of millions of dollars and years of planning have already been invested to get the project shovel-ready. $3 billion from the Commonwealth government remains on the table for any Victorian government which wants to build the East West Link."

Despite the cancellation of the project there remains some support for it, either in whole or part, chiefly from the Liberal Party at state and federal level. In October 2015 federal Environment Minister Greg Hunt said the federal government remained committed to the project, but later that month the Victorian government was told it could use the East-West Link money for other projects.

A freeway connection between CityLink and the Eastern Freeway, anticipated to be built by 2046, was included in a blueprint for future metropolitan infrastructure that was contained in the 2016 business case for the Western Distributor project. The report was commissioned by Victorian Department of Treasury and Finance and prepared by consultants PricewaterhouseCoopers using information on the future transport network provided by the Department of Economic Development, Transport, Jobs and Resources. The route was also identified by Infrastructure Australia in a 2016 report as one of Australia's 32 "highest priority" infrastructure needs because of rising east–west traffic congestion problems.

The Victorian Liberal opposition pledged to restart the project if it regained power in the 2018 state election and in April 2017 the Lonsdale Consortium, the private operator of the Port of Melbourne, said the entire western section of the East West Link would be needed "in the short to medium term" to overcome road congestion.

== Benefits ==
In his East West Link Needs Assessment report, Eddington said the study team had identified a long-term, strategic need for a new transport route linking Melbourne's east and west. The factors included:

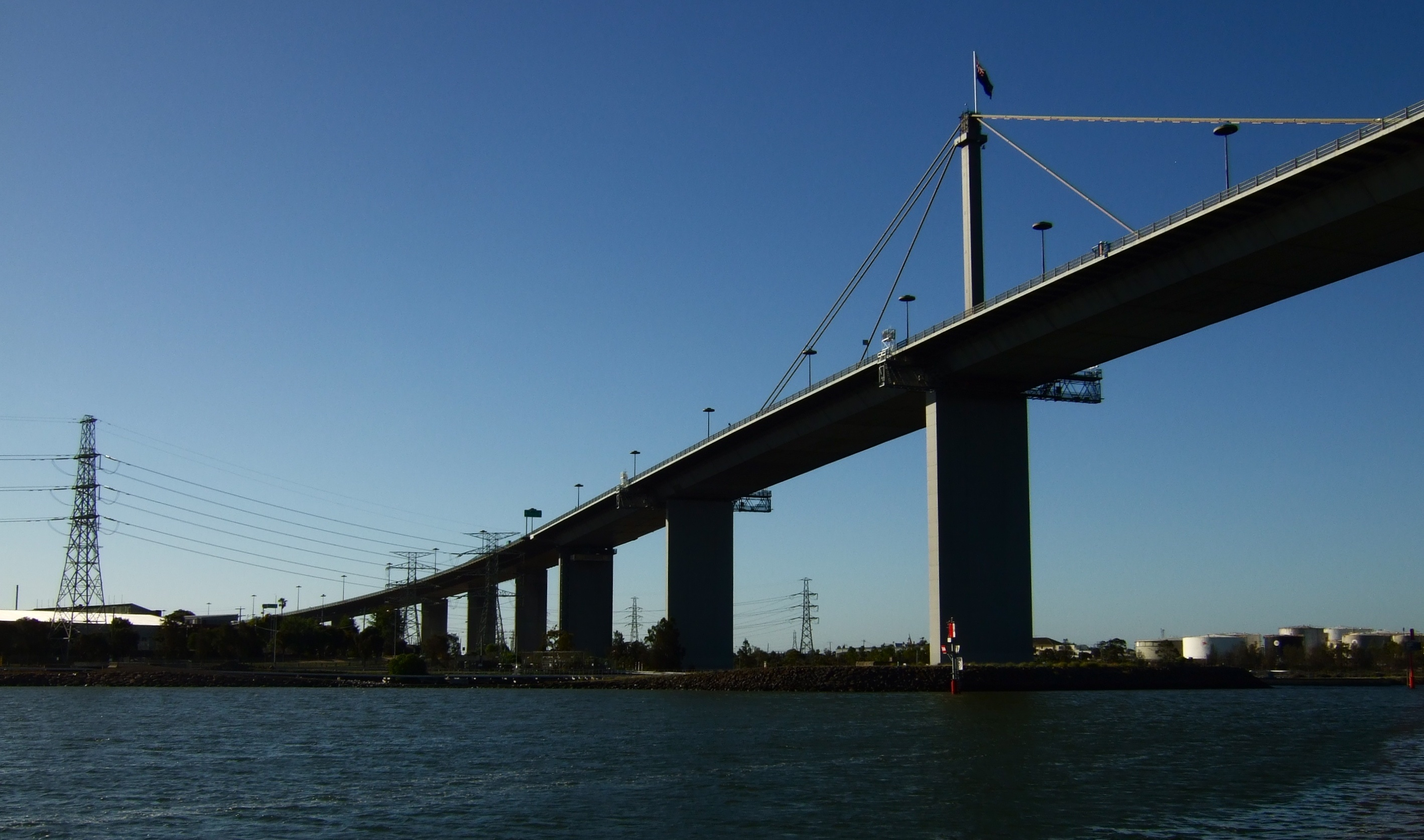
The West Gate Bridge, Melbourne, which was built to handle 40,000 vehicles a day, is now used by over 165,000 a day.

- Melbourne's "pressing need" for a road alternative to the West Gate Bridge (there are 3 rail bridges), whose usage is forecast to rise from a current 165,000 vehicles a day to 235,000 by 2031. The Eddington study team carried out a risk assessment on the West Gate Bridge, including modelling a scenario where the bridge was out of action for an extended period and said the results highlighted the urgency of securing a second major river crossing. "In the short-term, even a minor traffic incident such as an accident or car breakdown can have a severe, costly and disruptive effect, bringing traffic across the inner west to a halt and spreading across Melbourne's entire transport network," the report said. "In the longer term, an incident that restricted access to the bridge or rendered it unavailable for an extended period of time would have potentially catastrophic economic repercussions that would extend well beyond Melbourne."
- Forecasts in population, economic and traffic growth that would place further pressure on the West Gate-Monash Freeway corridor, Melbourne's only major east–west link. The report noted: "There are very significant increases in projected growth across the network for daily travel between now and 2031. The increase in demand will be predominantly east-west traffic rather than north-south traffic."
- Growing freight levels and the importance to Melbourne and Victorian industry of freight efficiency. By 2035 the Port of Melbourne is expected to be handling more than four times the number of containers, more than three times the volume of Bass Strait trade, more than two-and-a-half times the number of new motor vehicles and double the quantity of bulk products compared with 2006 figures. About 80 per cent of port freight is transported by road. A 2006 Victorian Competition and Efficiency Commission study also found the number of light commercial vehicles on Melbourne roads was growing faster than the rise in cars and trucks and that this growth affects congestion, especially around retail centres.

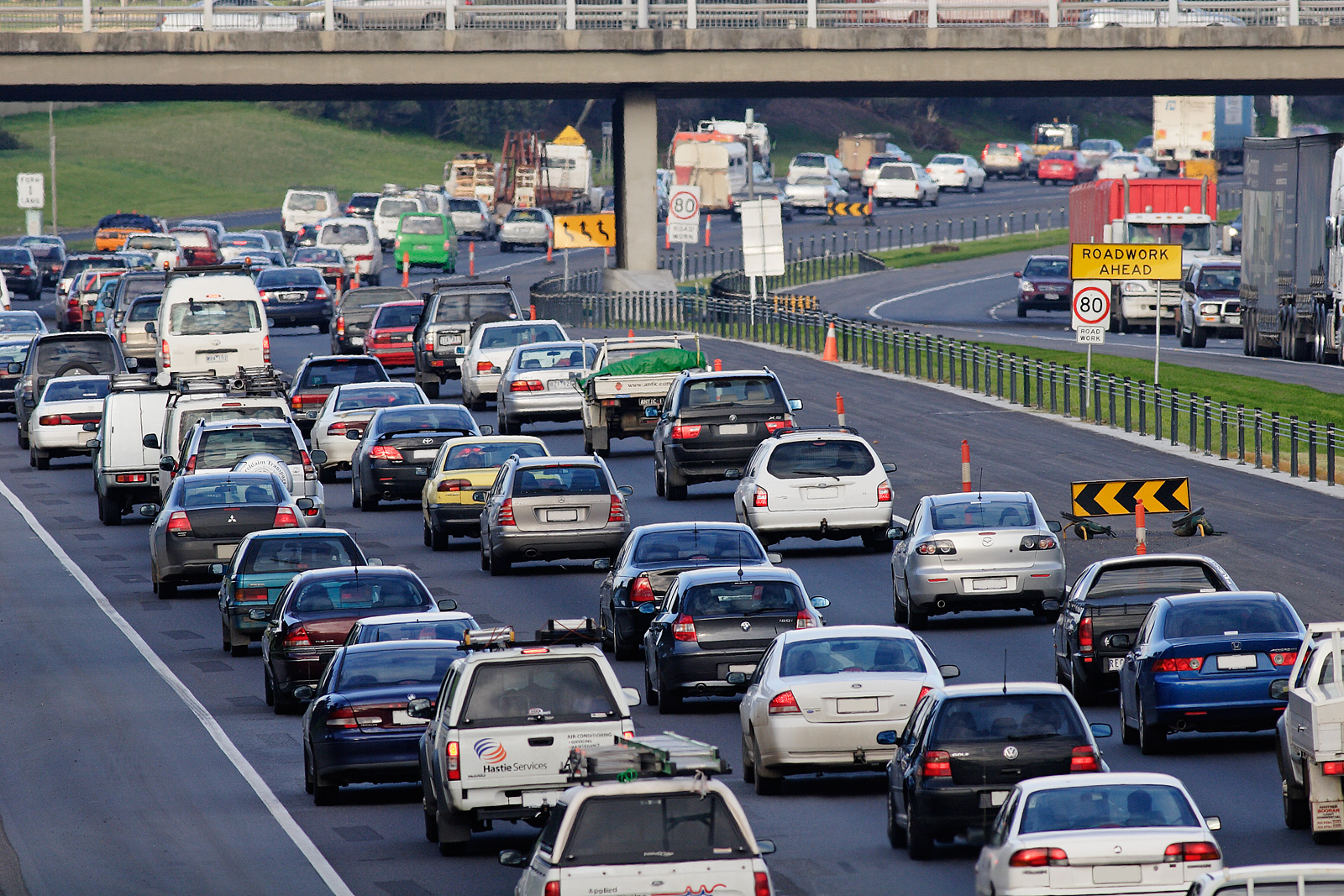
Traffic congestion on the Monash Freeway, Melbourne.

- Increasing travel times and congestion on Melbourne's road network. Eddington wrote: "The consequence of the growth in demand and the finite road capacity is that inter-peak traffic will become much heavier, with peak period traffic congestion being experienced over many more hours of the day." He said most roads north of CBD were predicted to have congestion issues in 2031, especially around their intersections with Alexandra Parade. More drivers would also seek to avoid congestion on cross-city routes by rat running through inner north streets.
- The strong and growing demand for cross-city travel, particularly from the west, driven by the rate of development and population growth to the city's west and north-west. "For traffic from the west, the road (and rail) networks will be under immense pressure," the report said. "This will impact upon the ability to travel from the west to the city."

He said the East West Link would provide a range of benefits:

- It would provide a long-term alternative to the West Gate Bridge;
- It would help to relieve congestion at the end of the Eastern Freeway by removing through traffic;
- It would reduce rat running through the inner north;
- Opportunities would be created to improve north–south public transport movement;
- It would enhance connectivity between the port and freeway network, encouraging more trucks on to the appropriate freeway network;
- It would carry as much as 20 per cent of passengers, workers and freight between Melbourne Airport and the eastern suburbs; and
- It would facilitate separated and dedicated bus lanes on either Johnston Street or Alexandra Parade.

A 2014 report by the Victorian Auditor-General on traffic management noted that two Alexandra Parade intersections, which would benefit from traffic diversion through an east–west tunnel, were among Melbourne's most congested intersections in the morning and evening peaks. They were Alexandra Parade/Queens Parade/Brunswick St, Fitzroy North (sixth most congested intersection in AM peak) and Alexandra Parade/Nicholson St/Princes St, Carlton North (10th most congested intersection in PM peak).

=== Predicted usage ===
The Eastern Freeway carries 140,000 vehicles a day and the Victorian Government estimated the first stage of the new road would be used by 80,000 vehicles a day, travelling in both directions. It said its forecast was more optimistic than that produced by the EWLNA study team. The EWLNA report suggested the project, when complete, would carry more than 150,000 vehicles a day. Eddington's 2008 report dismissed as a "myth" and "misconception" the belief that nearly all Eastern Freeway traffic is destined for the inner city. It said analysis of distribution of Eastern Freeway traffic showed that "around 40 per cent of the daily traffic from the freeway travels beyond the central city area—to the south and the west". The Eddington report also highlighted the "very substantial" and growing west-to-east travel demand, resulting from the imbalance between population growth and employment opportunities in the city's western suburbs.

== Funding ==
The Victorian Government estimated the capital cost of stage one of the project would be between $6 billion and $8 billion and the second stage up to $10 billion. The project would be funded as a public-private partnership, with money from the Commonwealth and state governments and the private sector. Toll revenue was expected to partly offset the costs of the project over the long term. A total of $224 million was allocated in the 2013–14 state budget for procurement for the first stage, with a further $70 million to follow in 2014–15. The Abbott Federal Government pledged $1.5 billion towards stage one during the 2013 federal election campaign and in April 2014 agreed to contribute another $1.5 billion—conditional on the Victorian government providing a business case—to allow an earlier start on stage two. Preliminary work on stage two was to have begun in late 2015. Some $500 million of the federal contribution to stage two of East West Link was diverted from commonwealth funds previously allocated to upgrade the Western Ring Road.

In February 2015 the federal Auditor-General, Ian McPhee announced he would investigate the Abbott government's decision to commit $3 billion for East West Link construction without a rigorous cost-benefit analysis.

== Community feedback ==
=== Support ===
East West Link has the ongoing support of the Victorian Liberal Party and the federal Liberal Party, which are the state and federal opposition respectively as of October 2024. Both state and federal levels of the Coalition have continually advocated for the funding and implementation of the East West Link.

=== Opposition ===
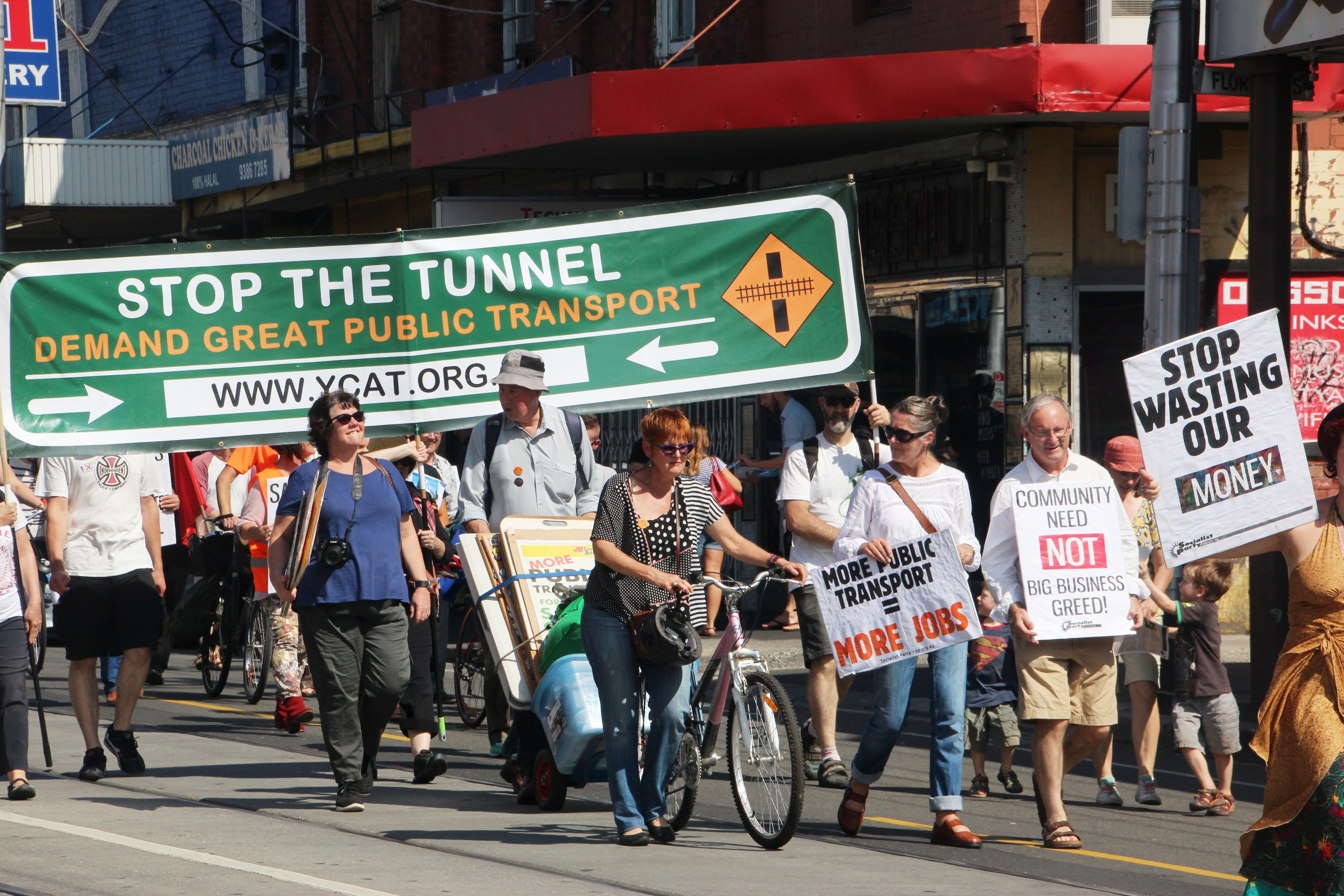
Rally against the East-West Link in Brunswick, supported by Moreland City Council, March 2014.

Elements of the East West Link project has encountered strident opposition from a range of stakeholders, among them academics, architects, resident action groups, industry groups, local councils, developer lobbies, the Greens, with some strongly opposed to the project in its entirety.

Since 2013, the East West Link project has the clear opposition of the Victorian Labor Party and the federal Labor Party, which are the Victorian and federal governments respectively as of October 2024.

The East West Link project attracted criticism from the local councils of Melbourne, Moreland, Yarra and Boroondara, the Public Transport Users Association, Geelong politicians and others, with complaints that it was a misuse of public funds, would fail to alleviate Hoddle Street congestion and would lead to permanent loss of parts of Royal Park. Critics claimed the need for the project was not supported by traffic statistics and that the State Government should instead have used funds for the Melbourne Metro Rail Project. The decision to start work first on the eastern end of the project was also criticised, with claims that the project's greatest need was to provide an alternative river crossing to the West Gate Bridge. Yarra City Council launched a "Trains Not Toll Roads" campaign in June 2013, to which it committed $200,000 from its 2013/14 Budget. It also spent $405,000 on legal representation at the Government's 30-day East West assessment committee hearings. A meeting to launch the campaign attracted 400 people and the council said it would look at all options, including legal challenges, to stop the tunnel. An online petition against the link attracted more than 1300 names.

==== Increased congestion ====
Yarra Council claimed the tunnel would exacerbate congestion on Hoddle Street, Flemington Road and surrounding streets. Mayor Jackie Fristacky said more than 80 percent of all inbound vehicles on the Eastern Freeway would still seek to exit at Hoddle Street and other inner roads to reach their inner-city destinations. "The East West Link will not help them. It will actually make congestion on Hoddle Street worse because it will get more cars on that road faster. It will ultimately cause major social, health and environmental damage," she said. A Victorian Department of Transport briefing prepared for Mulder said only a small proportion of vehicles now using Hoddle Street were likely to use the tunnel as an alternative if there were no off-ramps to the city, while a report for the government by consulting firm Veitch Lister in July 2013 found that while traffic on parts of Hoddle Street closer to the city would drop by up to 9 percent, the project could cause congestion on Hoddle Street closer to the Eastern Freeway to rise by up to 35 percent by 2021. Melbourne Airport chief executive Chris Woodruff warned that congestion between the city and airport could worsen once the East West Link was built unless the Tullamarine Freeway was widened. In its submission to the state government panel on the project, the City of Boroondara also raised concerns that traffic on some streets, including Princess and Asquith Streets and Burke Road, could rise by up to 30 percent.

==== Spending priorities ====
The decision to build the first stage of the East West Link was criticised as a misuse of public funds that should have been spent on public transport. Fristacky said the project would deprive Melbourne of billions of dollars that were needed for the construction of the Melbourne airport railway, Doncaster railway line, Rowville line, Melbourne Metro and the Mernda rail extension. Public Transport Users Association president Tony Morton said the project would not solve Melbourne traffic problems and that the 2013 state Budget should have focused on badly needed rail upgrades.

Polls conducted for The Age found Victorians favoured construction of the Metro rail project before the East West Link. A May 2013 poll (which did not reveal the poll sample, sampling method, questions or date of the survey) found 47 percent of voters supported the rail plan, while 43 percent supported the road project. A similar poll of 1000 voters in February 2014 found the Metro rail project was viewed as the infrastructure project with the highest priority (42 percent), followed by removing level crossings (27 percent) and the East West Link (24 percent). A November 2013 Age/Neilsen poll of 1000 voters found that 74 percent believed improving public transport was a bigger priority than building the East West Link tunnel. Some 23 percent considered the tunnel a higher priority. A Herald Sun/Seven News poll of more than 2500 Victorians in November 2014 found the East West Link was considered a higher priority than removing level crossings, an airport rail link and second underground rail loop. The Herald Sun provided no details on the poll's sampling method, questions or actual results. A further Age poll of 1000 respondents in November 2014 reported 59 percent in favour of the project and 29 percent opposed.

Infrastructure Australia prioritised the Melbourne Metro Rail Project tunnel ahead of East West Link.

==== Transparency of business case ====
The Napthine Government was criticised for its decision to withhold details of the business case for the project, including projected traffic levels. State Treasurer Michael O'Brien said the public release of details would jeopardise competitive advantage as it sought bidders for its construction, but federal advisory body Infrastructure Australia subsequently sought more information, claiming it had not been provided with the information to assess whether the link deserved federal funding. Chris Hale, lecturer in transport engineering at Melbourne University, said the government was not interested in Infrastructure Australia analysing benefit-cost ratios and that the project was an example of a lack of transparency over the approval and planning of major projects and Victorian Greens MP Greg Barber said the government was terrified that releasing the figures would show the road was not viable. "The figures will show this toll road is a dud," he said. "It will be a bigger lemon than the desalination plant." The Association of Superannuation Funds of Australia expressed a reluctance to invest in the project unless it could be proven to be profitable, though several major superannuation funds said they would have a "strong appetite" for the project if investor risk was minimised by direct payments by government. A senate committee investigation in February 2014 found that the state government's estimate, previously withheld from the public, showed a benefit-cost ratio of 80 cents per dollar invested if the estimated effects of economies of agglomeration were not taken into account, per the methodology used by Infrastructure Australia. The federal statutory authority recommends only those projects with a benefit-cost ratio of at least 1.5.

A study of international transport "mega-projects" led by Professor Harry Dimitriou of University College London concluded that tolls on the East West Link would have to be a minimum of $10.50 to produce a profit for investors, and the government would come under pressure to toll the Eastern Freeway. Two contributors to the study, Sophie Sturup and Nicholas Low, suggested the large profits flowing to private consultants during the planning phase created a moral hazard—"because those who will make money from the road are not those who will invest in it or use it. Knowing that their employer and cash cow has committed itself to the construction, there is a strong incentive for consultants to invent reasons for the project from which they can walk away when the financial architecture they have created collapses like a house of cards." Kenneth Davidson, a columnist for The Age and outspoken critic of the project, claimed the government's business case did not justify the road and that "the financial burden on the Victorian taxpayer will be so big that it will 'crowd out' the state's core responsibilities for funding schools, hospitals, rail transport and even other roads for at least a generation."

An analysis of the project by a team of transport planners and financial analysts from three Melbourne universities concluded that its full cost could have reached $17.8 billion by 2045. The team, including five professors, used publicly available information to estimate that annual "availability" payments to the construction consortium could have risen from $360 million to almost $720 million, while interest on state government borrowings could have reached $77 million a year. The state government's capital contribution would have been $2 billion. The state Treasurer, Michael O'Brien, described the analysis as "absolute garbage" and said it was the work of "a bunch of left-wing academics with a clear anti-roads agenda".

==== Staging ====
Then Opposition leader Daniel Andrews, some Geelong politicians as well as the G21 Geelong regional alliance and the Metropolitan Transport Forum, which represents 23 councils covering three million residents, criticised the Government's decision to begin work on the eastern end of the project. Andrews said the Government had ignored congestion problems in Melbourne's western suburbs and threatened Victoria's economic growth with commuters and freight carriers losing time in traffic. He said Victorian Labor "could not support the tunnel" and said Labor would release a detailed transport alternative before the end of 2013. Labor Party federal member for Corio Richard Marles said the greatest need was for an alternative to CityLink as an entry to Melbourne and state Labor MP for Bellarine Lisa Neville said the decision to start from the east was disastrous for the Geelong region. The Metropolitan Transport Forum said it had written to Transport Minister Terry Mulder urging the Government to reconsider its priorities and start the project at is western end make an earlier start on the Melbourne Metro Rail Project tunnel because it would take more trucks off suburban streets, improve public transport and support the growth of the Port of Melbourne.

Demographer Bernard Salt criticised the decision to focus on the eastern end of the project and said Melbourne's most pressing traffic issue was the second river crossing into the city from the west. He said West Gate Freeway traffic was growing by 2.1 percent a year, compared with 1.8 percent on the Eastern Freeway. Salt said Melbourne was rebalancing to the west, with Wyndham and Melton "the fastest-growing development front anywhere in Australia at the moment, maybe 20,000 people a year". Anton Mayer, chief executive of LeadWest, an organisation that promotes economic development in the western suburbs, said the government's decision meant western suburbs residents and road users would be stuck with just one freeway into the city—the West Gate Freeway—for most of the next decade. He said residents in Footscray and Yarraville would have to endure heavy truck traffic on local roads for years until the western section of East West Link was built. G21 chairman Ed Coppe commended the decision to commit to the project, but said congestion on the West Gate Bridge and in the western suburbs had become a major and growing hindrance to commuter and business traffic between Geelong and Melbourne. He said G21 would maintain pressure on the government to urgently progress the western end of the link.

==== Other issues ====
Criticism over the project also included the effects on Melbourne Zoo, Royal Park and Koonung Creek Reserve, prospect of high tolls, the lack of emergency lanes, concerns that consequent Eastern Freeway widening would take up land in the freeway median earmarked for the Doncaster railway line, the loss of homes and property values because of construction and concerns that it would cast a shadow on the community gardens and create noise pollution for residents in Flemington public housing.

== Release of business case ==
Cabinet documents and the previously secret business case and construction contract details were released by the incoming state government in December 2014, revealing for the first time the costing rationale for the project. An initial assessment in March 2013 had found the road would return 45 cents in benefits for every dollar spent. When "wider economic benefits" were factored in, the return rose to 84 cents for every dollar spent. Cabinet documents showed the Napthine government opted not to submit the business case to Infrastructure Australia, fearing it could reject the project because of the poor cost-benefit ratio. Three months later the government prepared a new business case that included other measures, including the widening of CityLink, the Tullamarine Freeway and the Eastern Freeway, to produce an estimated return of $1.40 for every dollar invested. Those figures were used by the government in a short-form business case it presented to Infrastructure Australia.

The documents also showed that once the full 18 km road link was complete in 2023, the project's builder was to receive annual payments of more than $340 million. Tolls were expected to raise $137 million annually, requiring taxpayers to contribute an additional $205 million a year.

== Audits ==
In December 2015 Victorian acting Auditor-General Peter Frost issued an audit report on the project that criticised the actions of both the Napthine Coalition government and the Andrews Labor government in starting and terminating the project.

Frost concluded the decision to sign construction contracts so close to the November 2014 state election was imprudent and exposed the state to significant cost and risk when it knew there was a significant risk that legal challenges would prevent it from proceeding. He said the project's business case had not clearly established the need for the investment; had not been able to demonstrate the accuracy and plausibility of the assumed wider economic benefits; had not addressed major concerns by peer reviewers over traffic modelling raised; and had not provided a sound basis for prioritising the eastern section over other sections of the road. Frost said the decision to start work first on the eastern section had been a government policy decision rather than being based on cost-benefit analysis.

Frost said the decision by the Andrews government to terminate the project had been made without full consideration of the merits of continuing, or by weighing those benefits against the costs of terminating the contract. He said the government had reimbursed costs claimed by the East West Consortium despite being refused access to the consortium's financial records to verify the amount, ultimately incurring termination costs of $1.1 billion for little tangible benefit.

== Use and disposal of acquired houses ==
In October 2014 by the Linking Melbourne Authority announced it would compulsorily acquire more than 100 homes for the East West Link. After abandoning the project the Andrews Labor government announced it would progressively sell most of them over the following two years, but transfer 20 houses to the social housing sector specifically to accommodate homeless people. In March 2016 a group of homeless women attempted to squat in one of about nine houses in Bendigo Street Collingwood that remained vacant, but were evicted by the state government. The action sparked the Bendigo Street housing dispute by Homeless Persons Union Victoria, homeless people, squatters and housing campaigners.

== See also ==
- West Gate Distributor
- West Gate Tunnel (A similar project completed in Melbourne)
- Bendigo street housing campaign
- North East Link (A similar project currently under construction in Melbourne)
- WestConnex (A similar project completed in Sydney)
- Perth Freight Link (A similar project proposed in Perth which was also cancelled due to a change in government)
