= Olympic Hot Doughnuts =

Defunct Australian bakery company

Olympic Hot Doughnuts was a local business operating in Footscray, Victoria, Australia. It sold hot jam doughnuts outside of the Footscray Railway Station on Irving Street. The business operated outside of the station from 1979 until its closure in early 2017.

== Background ==
Olympic Hot Doughnuts was started by Greek immigrant Nick Tsiligiris outside of the Footscray station in the Irving St forecourt in 1979.

For more than 40 years the business operated out of two caravans on the station forecourt, selling jam doughnuts for 80 cents each. However, from 2012 to 2014 the station and Irving Street forecourt underwent a major development as part of the Regional Rail Link project.

There was much speculation about the business's future, as all the other shops on the station side of Irving Street had been demolished. However, due to insistence from local residents and traders that it would have a negative impact on Footscray should the business be made to move on, it was eventually announced that Olympic Hot Doughnuts would remain open.

For more than a year the caravans were moved around the forecourt via crane while construction crews continued to develop the new station. In 2014 – two new kiosks popped up close to the new station entrance. It was eventually announced that one of those kiosks would be for Olympic Hot Doughnuts which opened to the public on 9 July 2014. Former Premier Denis Napthine was in attendance. The old caravans were sent to the Melbourne Museum for exhibition.

In 2015, filmmakers Ian Tran and Rachael Morssink made a short documentary about Olympic Hot Doughnuts, titled Olympic Nick: a documentary'. In the eleven-minute film the station rebuild period was re-examined, and other Footscray traders were asked for their opinions on Tsiligiris and Olympic Hot Doughnuts. It was also revealed by one of the community advisers for Footscray from the former Regional Rail Link Authority that Tsiligiris prior to the establishment of the kiosk did not in fact have a land title.

== Closure ==
In April 2016 Tsiligiris had a serious car accident and as a result was forced to close the shop for some time. As a result, rumors spread as to the fate of Tsiligiris with incorrect speculation he had died. As a result, his family was forced to deny this was the case. However, in January 2017, Tsiligiris was forced to close Olympic Hot Doughnuts, due to ill health. In March 2017, it was announced that a new business would take over from Tsiligiris selling doughnuts in the kiosk.

== Legacy ==
In May 2020, a Mural of Tsiligiris' face with the Olympic Doughnuts logo in the background was erected on Leeds Street, Footscray, not far from the station and original site of the former caravan and current kiosk, by a local artist. In April 2021 the State Library Victoria acquired a miniature model of the original Olympic Doughnuts Van made by artist David Hourigan.

Tsiligiris died on 21 October 2021.
