= Infrastructure Partnerships Australia =

Australian think tank

- Type: Partnership
- Industry: Infrastructure
- Founded: 2005
- Headquarters: 95 Pitt street, Sydney 2000
- Key people: Adrian Dwyer (Chief Executive Officer), Sir Rod Eddington AO (Chairman)
- Website: www.infrastructure.org.au

Infrastructure Partnerships Australia (IPA) is an industry body representing Australia’s infrastructure industry. Infrastructure Partnerships Australia was launched in 2005 by then NSW Premier Morris Iemma, and in Victoria by then Treasurer John Brumby, drawing together senior public and private sector Chief Executives in infrastructure businesses. The Australian Council for Infrastructure Development (AusCID) amalgamated with Infrastructure Partnerships Australia in September 2006.

Infrastructure Partnerships Australia aspires to inform the public policy debate around solutions to Australia's infrastructure challenges, initially focussed largely on the development of privately financed procurement models, including public private partnerships (PPPs).

The organisation provides policy research and commentary around a number of key issues in Australia, including:

- Road User Charging
- Electricity networks
- And other transport, utilities, social infrastructure and taxation reforms

Infrastructure Partnerships Australia also publishes the Australian Infrastructure Metric in conjunction with BIS Shrapnel, a quarterly survey of construction work won.

Infrastructure Partnerships Australia's policy and research programme is informed by its organisation’s National Advisory Board, policy taskforces and research units looking at taxation and regulations bearing on infrastructure markets.

The group’s Chairman is Sir Rod Eddington AO and Chief Executive is Adrian Dwyer. IPA's Patrons include founding Chairman Mark Birrell, former NSW Liberal Premier Nick Greiner, Macquarie Group's Nicholas Moore, former Sydney Water Managing Director, Chief Executive Officer Kerry Schott, Transfield's Tony Shepherd and Adrian Kloeden.
