= Kerry Schott =

Australian executive (born 1944)

Dr Kerry Schott AO
- Born: 20 September 1944 (age 82); Bowral, New South Wales, Australia
- Education: University of New England (Australia), University of British Columbia, Nuffield College, Oxford
- Occupation: Business executive
- Known for: Sydney Water

Kerry Elizabeth Schott AO (born 20 September 1944) is an Australian executive who has had roles in the business and government sectors. She was managing director and CEO of Sydney Water from 2006–2011. She is currently Chair of the New South Wales Net Zero Emissions and Clean Economy Board, Chair of the Advisory Board to EnergyCo NSW, and an Adviser to Aware Super. She is a patron of Infrastructure Partnerships Australia.

== Early life ==
Schott graduated with a Bachelor of Arts with first class Honours from the University of New England, undertook a Masters of Arts at the University of British Columbia, and a doctorate in economics at Nuffield College, Oxford.

== Career ==
Her early career included investment banking for 14 years with senior roles at Deutsche Bank, Bankers Trust and Whitlam Turnbull.

Schott has also had roles as visiting professor at Oxford and Princeton Universities, senior NSW Treasury official, chair of the Environmental Protection Authority, Director of NBN, Chair of Moorebank Intermodal Company, adviser to the Reserve Bank of Australia and Trade Practices Commissioner. She chaired the Energy Security Board from 2018-2021 and was tasked with redesigning the National Electricity Market for the increase in renewable energy.

During her time as CEO of Sydney Water, Schott opposed a proposal by Australian Water Holdings (AWH) for a public-private partnership. The Independent Commission Against Corruption later heard that this proposal was part of a scheme by Eddie Obeid that would earn the Obeids up to $60 million through their secret stake in AWH. Due to Schott's opposition, Obeid lobbied Phil Costa, water minister at the time to "sack the bitch", but she was retained with the minister later describing her performance as "nothing short of excellent". She continued to stand up against the alleged corruption around her, warning Arthur Sinodinos (acting AWH chairman), that the people at AWH were dishonest.

In 2014, Schott chaired a panel that reviewed NSW electoral funding. The outcome ruled out full public funding of election campaigns, an option that had been favoured by the Premier Mike Baird and opposition leader John Robertson.

In 2013-14, Schott oversaw the sale of NSW Coal Fired Power Stations to AGL, Origin, Energy Australia and the Vales Point Power Station to a company owned by Trevor St Baker and Brian Flannery.

On 30 October 2023, Federal Treasurer Jim Chalmers appointed Schott as chair of the Competition Taskforce Advisory Panel, which has been established to advise the Treasury on national competition policy.

== Recognition ==
Schott accepted an Honorary Doctor of Science in Economics from the University of Sydney in 2014. She also received Honorary Doctorates from the Western Sydney University in 2015 and the University of New England in 2018.

Government offices
| Preceded by David Evans | Managing Director of Sydney Water Corporation; 2006 – 2011 | Succeeded by Kevin Young |
