= Railway Place =

Street in Melbourne, Victoria

Railway Place streetscape

Railway Place is a residential street in the western Melbourne suburb of Footscray, Victoria, Australia. The majority of the street is covered by a Heritage Overlay and was threatened with demolition as part of the Regional Rail Link project, but was left unchanged following changes to the project.

== Geography ==
Railway Place is laid out following the curve of the railway tracks, running roughly east–west between the parklands of Fordham Reserve and Newells Paddock. The street runs alongside the major rail corridor which carries the Werribee, Sunbury and Williamstown metropolitan lines, as well as V/Line regional trains. Railway Place has 25 houses in total, of which 20 are on the side that adjoins the railway.

== History ==
Most houses in the street were built between the 1880s and 1920s. Many have since been renovated in line with a Heritage Overlay which recognises the street's historic character.

== Regional Rail Link ==
The Regional Rail Link project provided two additional rail tracks along the route between Southern Cross and Sunshine. The project team released route maps that showed that the additional track would run on the south side of the existing rail corridor, through industrial land known as the Joseph Road Precinct.

Residents were informed that Regional Rail Link would not impact on their properties by letters from Member for Footscray Marsha Thomson, although residents' concerns relating to increased noise levels and a proposed flyover remained.
