= Victorian Transport Plan =

Defunct transport planning framework for Victoria, Australia

Document cover and main theme

The Victorian Transport Plan was a transport planning framework for the state of Victoria, Australia announced on 9 December 2008 by then Premier of Victoria, John Brumby. The plan was submitted to the Government of Australia for funding approval.

It was prepared in response to and largely centred on solutions to urban transport problems in Victoria's capital Melbourne, particularly alleviating growing traffic congestion and passenger congestion on public transport (trains) as a result of a 100% increase in public transport patronage during the 2000s (decade).

The plan followed several previous transportation strategies including Linking Victoria, Linking Melbourne: Metropolitan Transport Plan and Meeting our Transport Challenges as well as major studies including the Eddington Transport Report.

The plan was shelved in January 2011 by the incoming Baillieu government, with the projects contained in it to be reviewed by the soon-to-be-established Victorian Public Transport Development Authority. $6 million of taxpayer funds were spent promoting the plan during the two years it was in place, including television, radio, newspaper, online and outdoor billboard promotions. These advertisements were described by one newspaper columnist as "Stalinist-style propaganda".

== Overview ==
The Victorian Transport Plan had six main goals which it aimed to achieve through extensive expansion of the public transport network and road system, and improvements made to existing roads and rail services, as well as dealing with changes in the way people travel around Melbourne and Victoria.

These 6 main goals were:

1. Shaping Victoria by integrating current services with new and existing land developments. This involves de-centralising Melbourne from the current CBD and investing in 6 'Central Activities Districts'. It also involves supporting growth in regional and rural Victoria as well as expanding the use of the current transport network.
2. Linking rural, regional and metropolitan Victoria involves creating better links between rural and regional centres through investment in rail and road services.
3. Creating a Metro system by investing heavily in expanding the existing rail network in Melbourne, as well as upgrading and improving punctuality, cleanliness and capacity. The centrepiece of this involves the construction of a metro rail tunnel as well as new trains, trams and stations all across Melbourne.
4. Moving around Melbourne involves better integration of current and future services of rail, bus and road services and significant improvements and expansion of the existing freeway and road network. This also involves the construction and improvement of bike trails around Melbourne
5. A sustainable future is planned by investing in alternative modes of transport to work such as cycling, scooters and walking as well as setting mandatory emissions targets for new cars.
6. Strengthening Australia's and Victoria's economy by investing and supporting the movement of good across Victoria more efficiently and supporting the creation of jobs through the construction of new roads and rail projects.

The delivery of these goals was to occur via the implementation of projects across Victoria, in particular, Melbourne, by setting short, medium and long term time frames for project delivery. Many of these projects were not fully costed and most were subject to further negotiations with the Federal government about funding, and the capacity of future state budgets to provide additional funds into the future.

Diagram showing Melbourne's rail network, including former and planned lines

== Projects ==
The Victorian Transport Plan involved more than $38 billion in projects. Major initiatives included:

- New trains and new tracks – an investment of more than $2.6 billion
- More trams and buses – $1.5 billion for 50 new low-floor trams and up to 270 new low-floor buses
- Regional Rail Link – more than $4 billion for a new track from West Werribee to Southern Cross station
- Melbourne Metro Rail Project – a new rail tunnel between the city’s west and east, costing more than $4.5 billion
- Better regional roads
- An alternative to the West Gate Bridge – more than $2.5 billion to build the East-West road connection as a new tunnel under the Maribyrnong River
- Shaping Victoria – $60 million to bring jobs and housing together
- Truck Action Plan - $380 million to remove trucks from residential streets in the inner west
- Completing the missing link in Melbourne's ring road - more than $6 billion for the North East Link between the Metropolitan Ring Road to the Eastern Freeway
- Peninsula Link - $750 million to link EastLink and the Mornington Peninsula Freeway
- Regional Rail – $600 million to return trains to Maryborough and for up to 74 new V/Line carriages
- Extension of the Metro Electrified Rail Network to South Morang, Sunbury, Melton and Cranbourne East to provide more transport choice in growth areas
- Removal of one level crossing at Springvale Road, Nunawading.

== Transport Integration Act 2010 ==
The Victorian Transport Plan is alluded to in the Transport Integration Act 2010, Victoria's prime transport statute. The act requires the Department of Transport – at the time of the plan, in its 2008 iteration – to "...prepare and periodically revise..." the plan. This is the first legislation in Victoria to mandate the preparation of a transport plan for the state.

The Transport Integration Act 2010 requires that the plan be revised having regard to the vision statement, transport system objectives and decision making principles set out in the act. The act also requires that the plan include medium to long term strategic directions, priorities and actions and demonstrate an integrated approach to transport and land use planning.

== See also ==
- Sustainable transport
- Environmental planning
- Land-use planning
- Transport Integration Act 2010
- List of Victorian Government infrastructure plans, proposals and studies
