= Eddington Transport Study =

Transport assessment in the United Kingdom

The Eddington Transport Study is an examination, by Sir Rod Eddington, of the impact of transport decisions on the economy and the environment of the United Kingdom, with recommendations on how the transport network should be modernised. The study was commissioned by the UK government, and a report of the study was published by them on 1 December 2006.

== Background ==
Sir Rod Eddington was commissioned by both the Chancellor of the Exchequer and the Secretary of State for Transport, in line with the government's stated commitment to sustainable development, to study the long-term reliance of and the UK's economic productivity, growth and stability on transport. The study was announced in the 2005 Budget. The report of the study was published on 1 December 2006 to support the 2006 Pre-Budget Report. A production of the New Labour era.

== Analysis ==
An analysis in The Times says that the study concludes that the UK's transport network is broadly adequate, connecting the right places, so the government does not need to worry about building new infrastructure such as high-speed rail links and cross-country motorways, but should instead concentrate on improving existing road and rail networks. That there are key points in the existing network at which pressure has to be eased. That parts of the network that are vital to economic success should receive investment and that congested and growing cities should be prioritised, as should inter-urban corridors and ports and airports. Their full cost to the environment, including their contribution to climate change, should be paid by all modes of transport. It states also that Sir Rod supports the gradual introduction of road pricing when there is political support for it, and that reformation of the planning system is required to speed up the building of infrastructure projects.

Another article in The Times focusses on the support given in the report for road-pricing, stating that the report suggests it as an alternative to a massive road-building programme to relieve increasing congestion that would damage the UK's economic competitiveness. It says that by 2025, road-pricing could deliver economic benefits worth £28 billion per year by halving congestion. It also notes the report's warning of the "very significant risks and uncertainties involved in delivering a pricing policy" particularly related to the required technology. This article also states that the air transport industry needs to become sustainable, possibly by requiring air passengers to pay their "full environmental costs", and that there is an economic case for more runway capacity. It also mentions that the report notes that due to falling passenger numbers, there is a case for improving the bus market outside London by strengthening competition.

== Reactions ==
Friends of the Earth were reported to have criticised the report's support for airport expansion, and to have supported its stance that large-scale road-building was not a solution.

BBC News also reported that the RAC Foundation, the road safety and environmental charity founded from the RAC research arm, prior to the de-merger of RAC plc, believe that motorists may be persuaded to support road-pricing if they were convinced of the benefit, and if other motoring taxes were reduced to compensate them, given that "nine out of 10 people don't trust the government to deliver a fair system of road pricing".

Transport 2000, the public transport advocacy group founded by railway unions in the 1970s, are reported to have said that revenue from road-pricing should be used to improve public transport, particularly the railway network, and not used for road-building.

The Freight Transport Association claimed that the protection of freight flows needs to be given priority and cannot wait for the introduction of road-pricing.
