= Regional Rail Link =

Rail expansion in Victoria

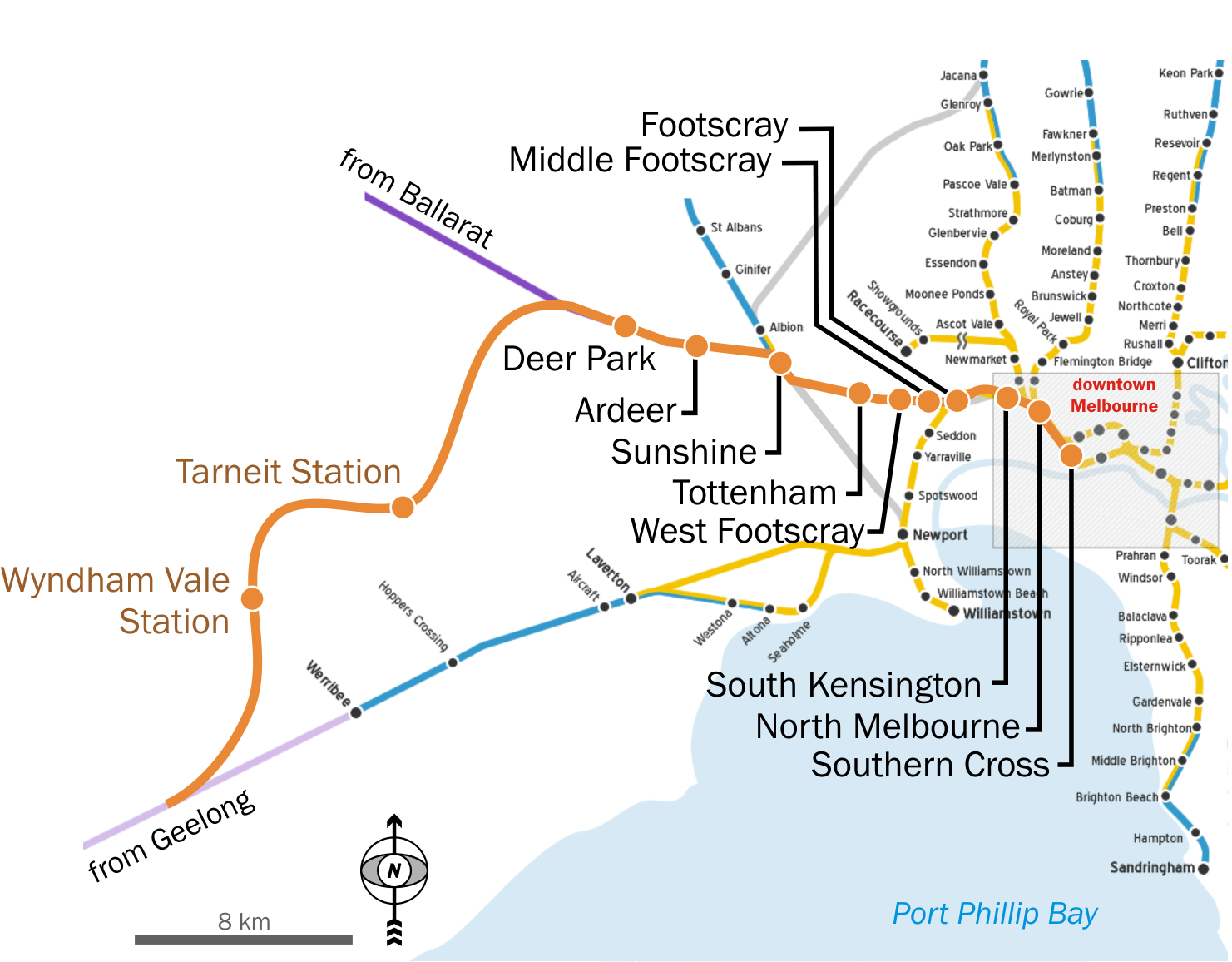
- Route of the Regional Rail Link in orange
- Location: Melbourne
- Proposer: Government of Victoria
- Status: Completed
- Type: Railway
- Cost estimate: $3.65 billion
- Start date: July 2009
- Completion date: June 2015
- Stakeholders: Government of Australia (major funding partner); Government of Victoria (minor funding partner); V/Line (operator); Metro Trains Melbourne; Train travellers on Geelong, Ballarat, Bendigo, Werribee and Sunbury lines
- Opponents: Fair-go for Footscray Rail Residents

Regional Rail Link (RRL) is a project to build a 47.5-kilometre (29.5 mi) length of railway through the western suburbs of Melbourne, Victoria. The name is also colloquially used to refer to the rail alignment constructed as part of the project.

The project aimed to increase rail capacity by separating regional services on the Geelong, Ballarat and Bendigo corridors from suburban services on the Werribee and Sunbury lines, while also serving new housing developments in the Tarneit and Wyndham Vale areas with a rail connection to the city.

A pair of new, non-electrified tracks were constructed from Southern Cross to Sunshine along a new alignment over the Maribyrnong River; this new alignment controversially bypasses North Melbourne station. Another new, non-electrified, double-track line was constructed from a junction site west of Deer Park to another junction site near the former Manor railway station, where it joins the Warrnambool railway line.

Stations were built at Tarneit and Wyndham Vale, while West Footscray and Sunshine were rebuilt. Two new platforms were built at Southern Cross and Footscray stations, and two level crossings near Sunshine were removed.

The project was managed by the Regional Rail Link Authority, on behalf of the Victorian Government. At the time, it was the largest transport infrastructure project being undertaken in Australia. Construction commenced in July 2009 and was fully completed in June 2015.

== History ==
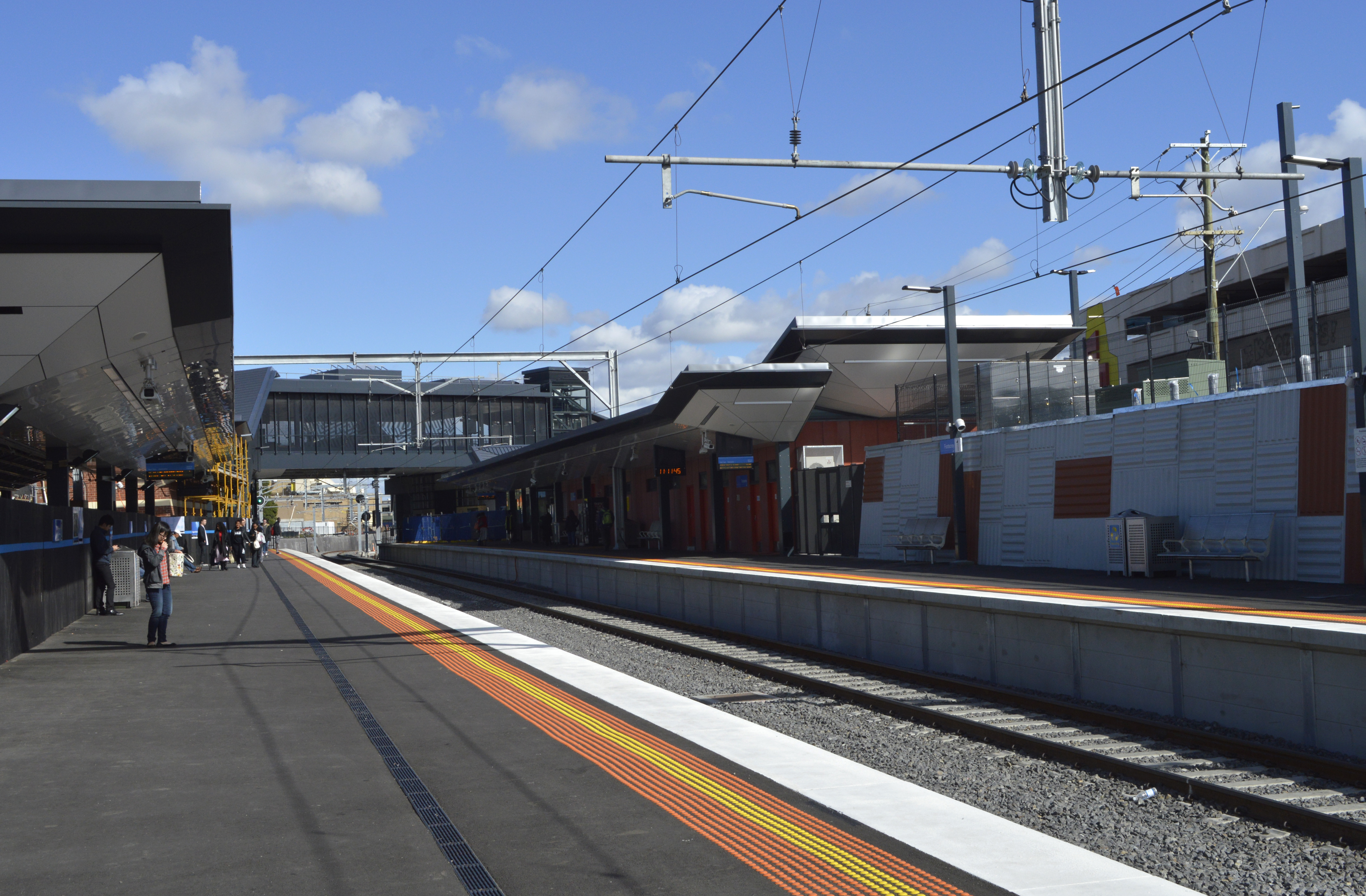
New platforms at Footscray station in May 2014

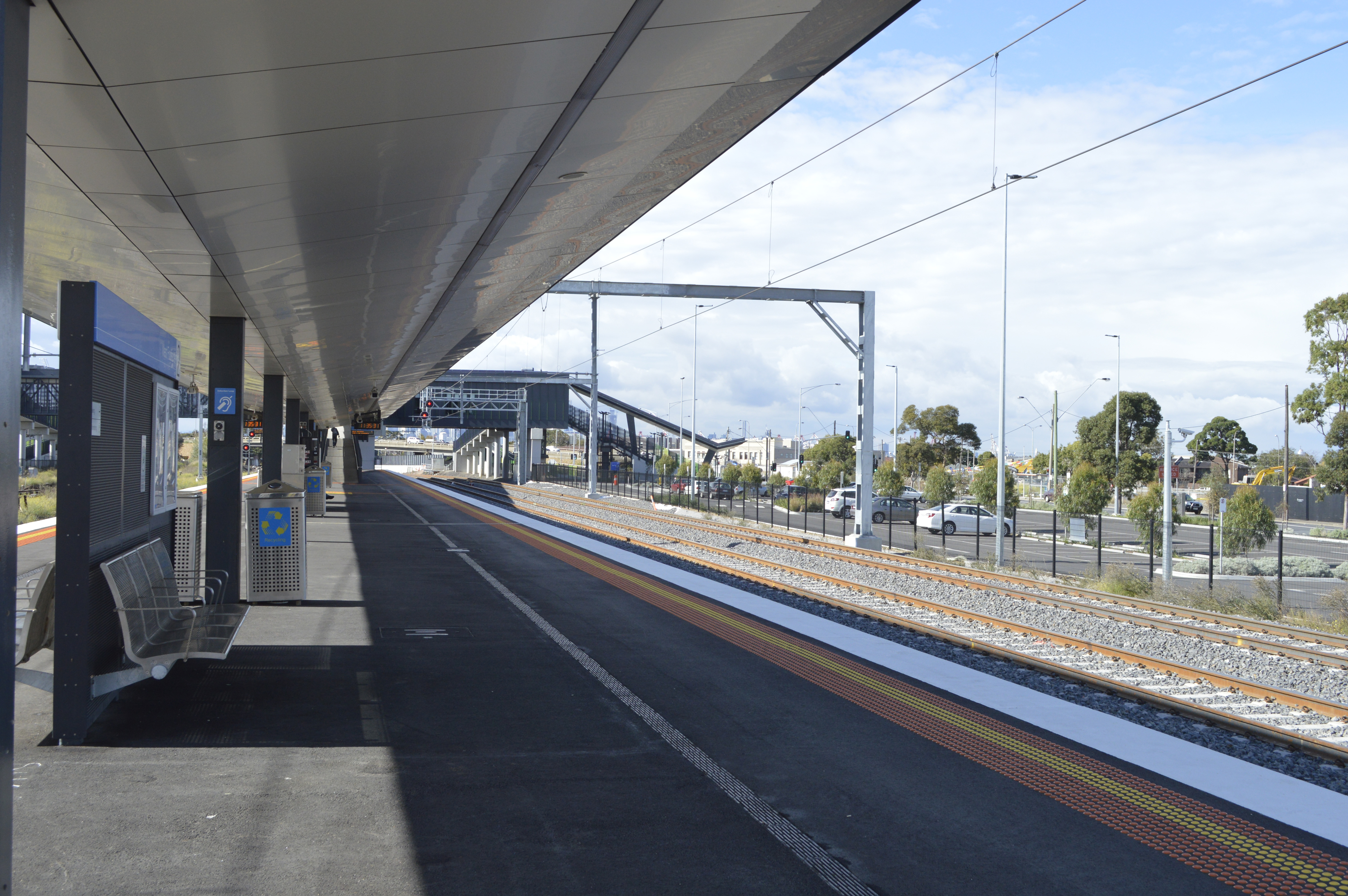
Rebuilt West Footscray station in May 2014

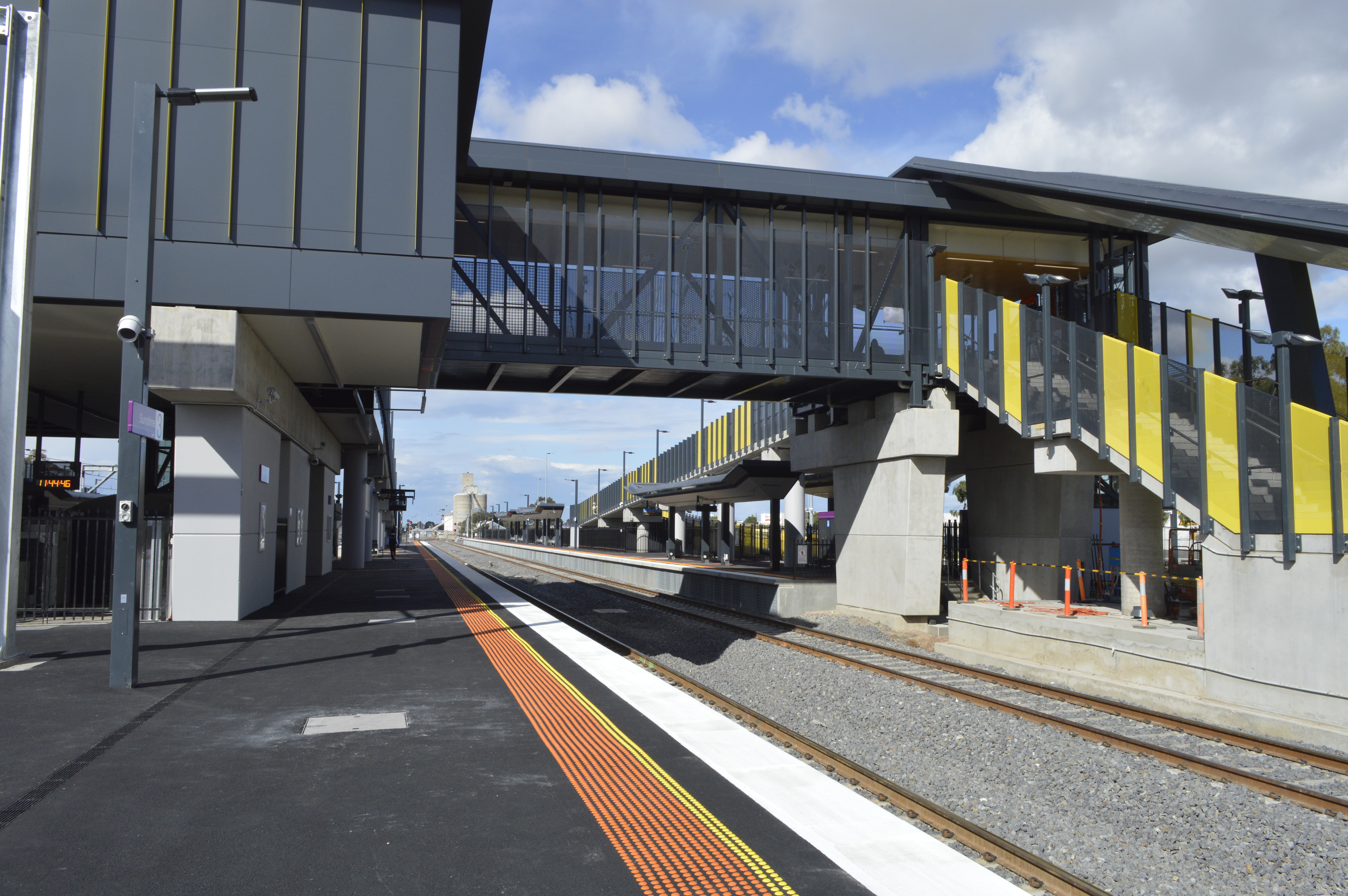
Rebuilt Sunshine station in May 2014

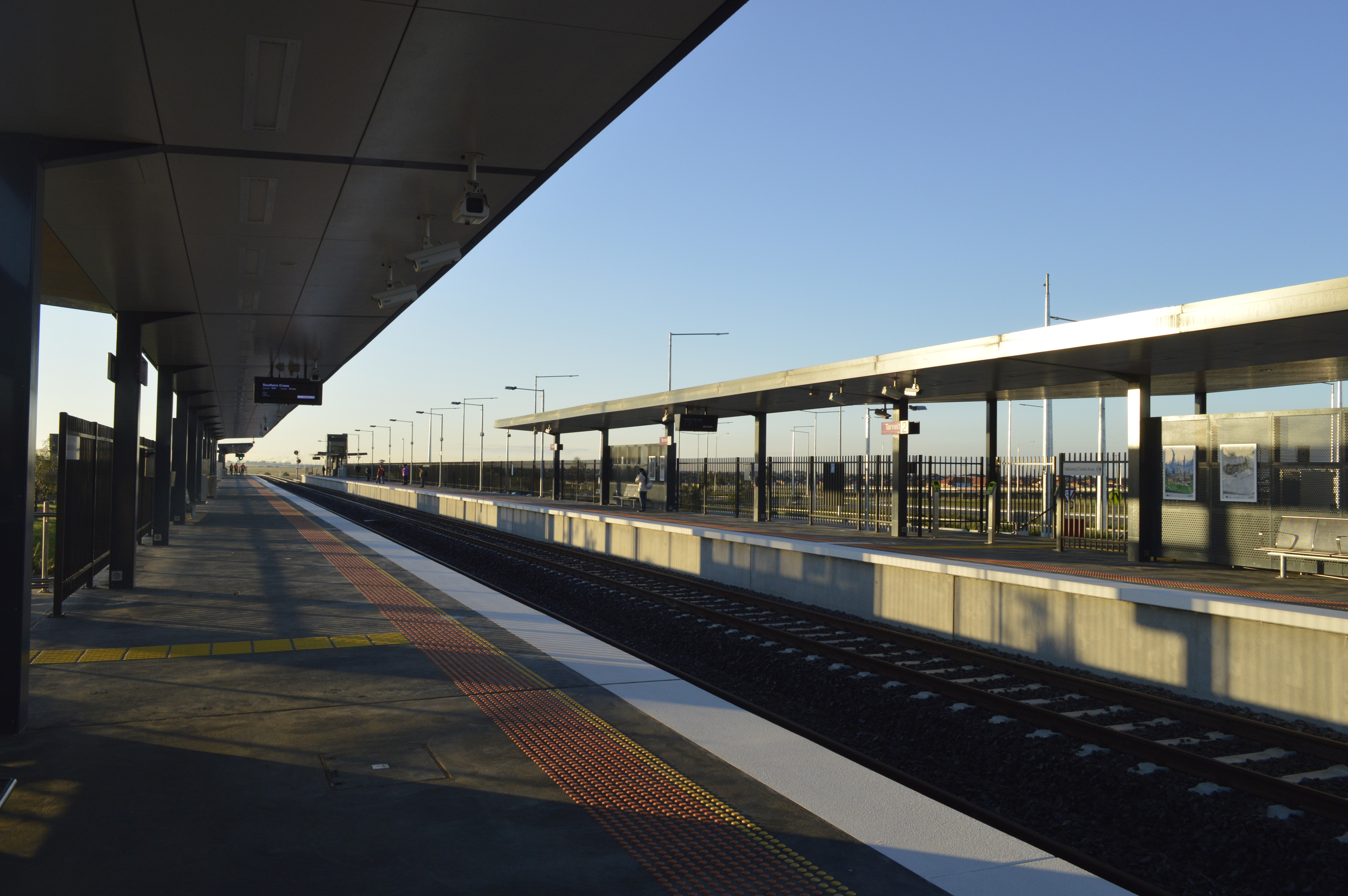
The new Tarneit station before opening in June 2015

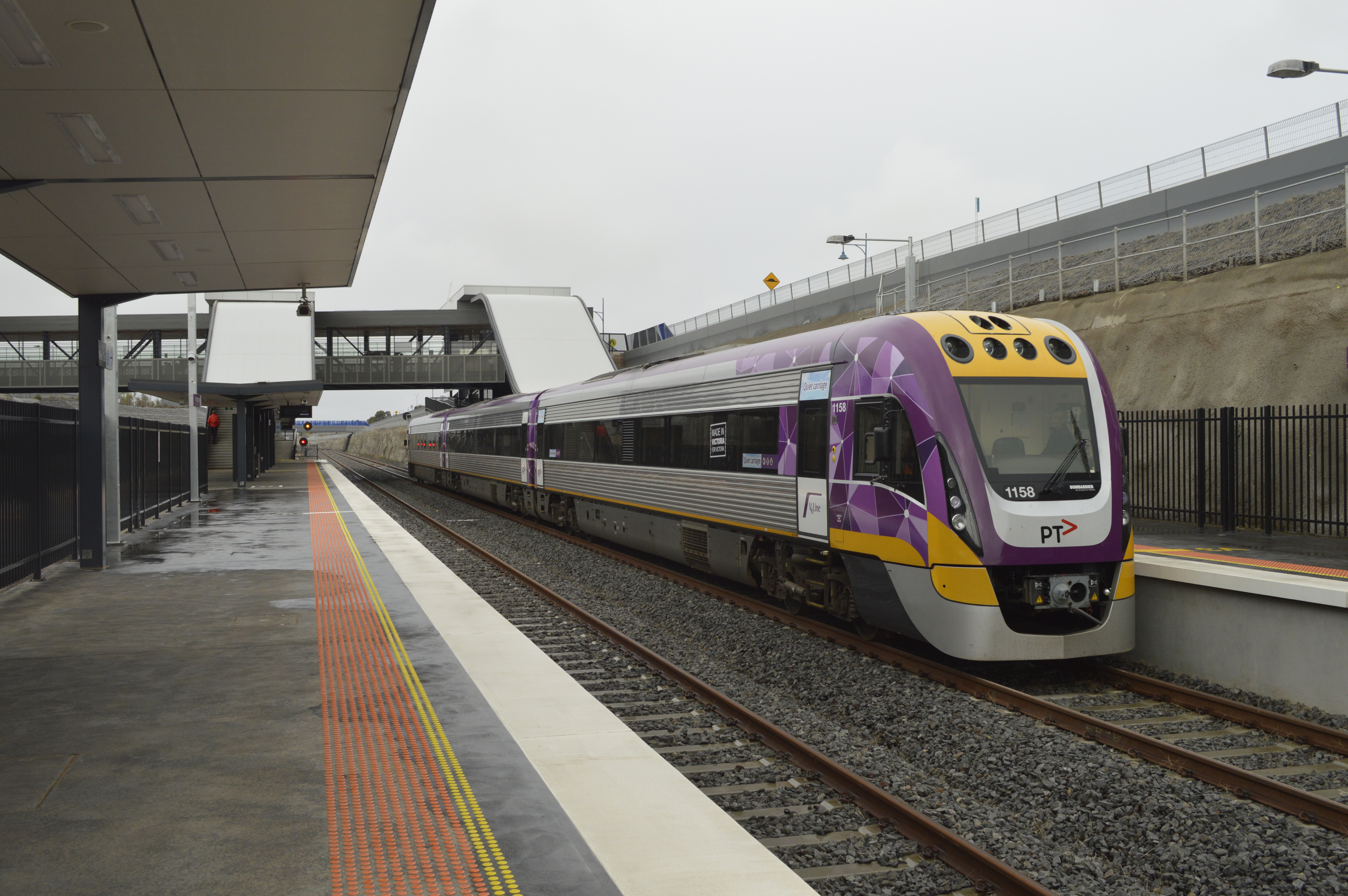
The new Wyndham Vale station before opening in June 2015

=== Background ===
Following the rail infrastructure improvements provided by the Regional Fast Rail project, there was an increase in both patronage and the number of regional services being operated. This led to congestion and increased delays in areas where trains operated by V/Line shared tracks with Metro Trains Melbourne suburban trains. Late running by V/Line or metropolitan rail services affected the reliability of other trains, while V/Line trains which ran express through most suburban stations limited the frequency and affected the timekeeping of stopping suburban trains. After major disruptions each operator might blame the other for causing the problem.

A separate line for regional trains between Geelong and Melbourne, then called the "Tarneit Link", was included as a possible long-term rail option in the Bracks government's 2006 Meeting Our Transport Challenges report. Costed at around $500 million, the link was also recommended in Rod Eddington's East-West Link Needs Assessment study, released in April 2008. By November 2008 the link between Deer Park and West Werribee was estimated to cost $1.5 billion.

=== Official status ===
The project was expanded and re-branded as the Regional Rail Link when announced as part of the Brumby Government's Victorian Transport Plan of December 2008. With a revised aim of separating all regional trains between Southern Cross and Geelong, Ballarat, and Bendigo, from suburban rail movements, the proposed route was from Southern Cross through Sunshine and Tarneit to West Werribee.

In May 2009 the project reached full funding, gaining the required allocation of $3.2 billion from the 2009 federal budget, adding to funds to be provided by the Victorian Government.

Several route options were investigated. One proposal involved the acquisition of up to 49 properties in Railway Place, Footscray to widen the existing railway corridor, and local residents launched a campaign against that proposal in May 2010. Other options floated were the sharing of tracks with freight trains in the existing Bunbury Street tunnel, or the construction of a second rail tunnel under Footscray A preliminary route between Sunshine and Werribee was released for public consultation in June 2009.

In July 2010, the final route through Footscray was announced by the state government. Heading away from Melbourne, the pair of Regional Rail Link tracks run south of the current four suburban tracks until after the line has crossed the Maribyrnong River, where a new bridge was built. After crossing the river, the line passes over the top of the Newport-bound suburban tracks on a flyover, and then runs between each pair of suburban tracks to Footscray station. At Footscray the line uses the existing platforms 1 and 2 (since renumbered 3 and 4), and then run on resumed land to the south of the suburban line to Sunshine, past Middle Footscray and West Footscray stations. Suburban trains towards Sunshine use the existing tracks except at Footscray, where two new platforms were built north of the four existing platforms.

To accommodate the final route, 26 homes and 84 businesses on Buckley Street, Footscray were acquired. Many residents did not find out their homes were to be acquired until told by journalists, waiting up to 24 hours for official notification from Department of Transport representatives. A Government spokeswoman said "every effort" had been made to contact the households affected, but bureaucrats had abandoned their planned visit to deliver the bad news because they did not want to be filmed by the media. The proposals would also have acquired 136 square metres (1,460 sq ft) of the heritage listed HV McKay Memorial Gardens, (Australia's oldest remaining industrial garden) as part of a grade separation along Anderson Road in Sunshine; after community resistance and lobbying by Brimbank City Council, plans were altered to reduce the acquisition of the gardens to approximately 5 square metres (54 sq ft).

=== Baillieu government review ===
In February 2011, the incoming Baillieu government announced the project was under review, citing poor planning and a blow-out in costs. After the review, the Baillieu government estimated the price tag for the line to be $880 million more than stated by the outgoing Brumby government. In November 2011, the secretary of the Victorian Department of Transport, Jim Betts, admitted that the lack of a mature plan, and the urgency of spending the money provided by the federal government as part of its economic stimulus package, meant that there had been a rush to finalise the financial arrangements of the scheme. He commented that "the budget for that project was basically haggled over between the state and the Commonwealth one weekend and we end up with a number written on the back of an envelope".

== Construction ==
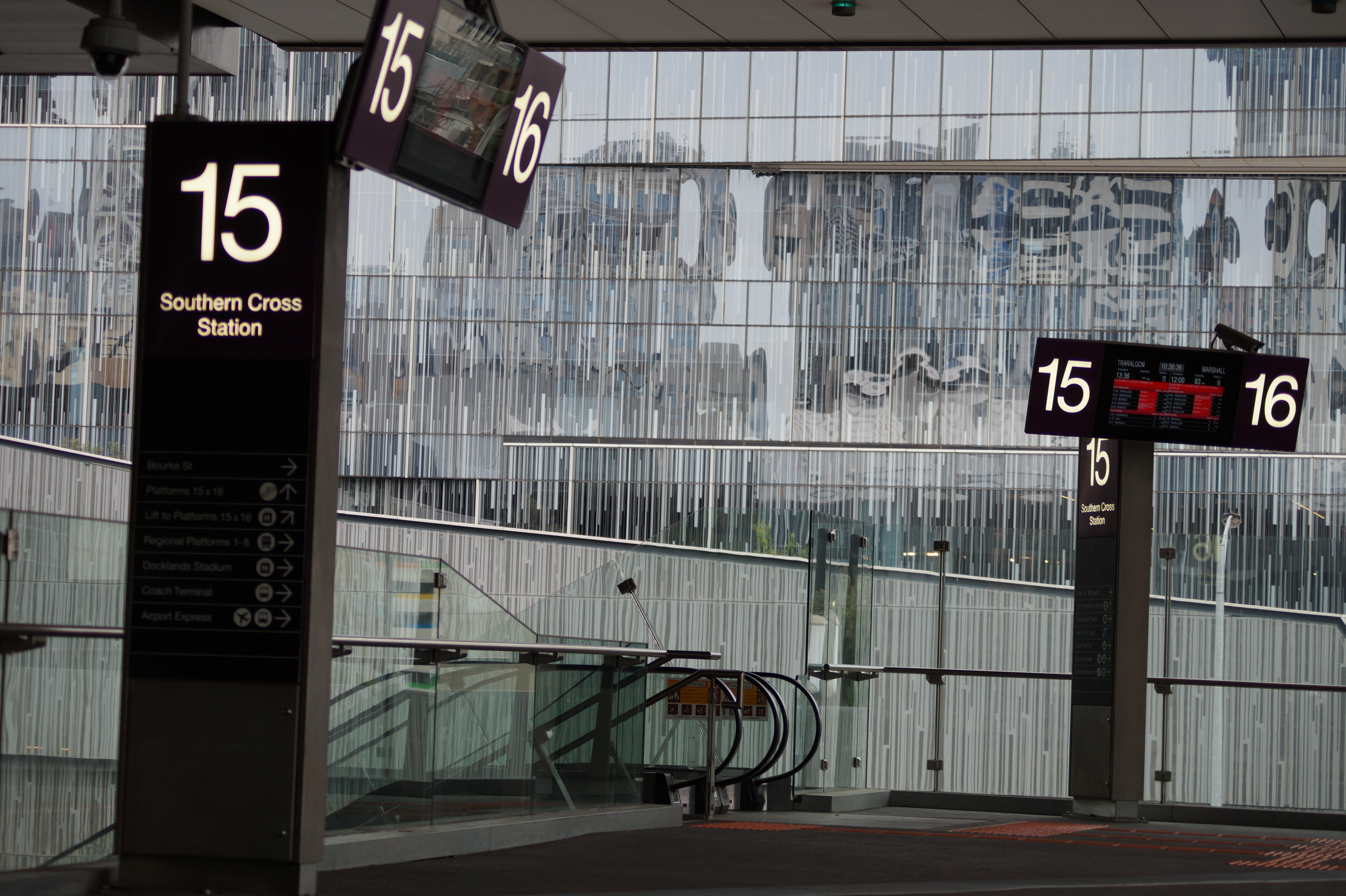
Southern Cross station platforms 15 & 16 northern concourse entrance in December 2013

Construction commenced in August 2009. The works were divided into seven packages: an overall railway signalling and control systems contract, and six sections of track:

- Signalling and control: consortium of UGL & Manidis Roberts
- Southern Cross station platforms 15 & 16: (overseen by Metro Trains Melbourne)
- Southern Cross station to Maribyrnong River (4.75 km): consortium of John Holland, Abigroup, Coleman Rail, AECOM & GHD
- Maribyrnong River to West Footscray station (2.35 km):
- West Footscray to Deer Park West (13.4 km): consortium of Balfour Beatty, Parsons Brinckerhoff, Sinclair Knight Merz & Thiess
- Deer Park West to West Werribee Junction (25.5 km as a design and construct contract): Baulderstone & Leighton Contractors joint venture
- West Werribee Junction/Geelong Line interchange (approximately 1.5 km): Leighton Contractors & Downer EDI joint venture.

=== Timeline ===
- 2 July 2011: construction begins, with the shifting of existing railway tracks between Sunshine and Tottenham
- 18 July 2011: Sydenham, Ballarat and Bendigo lines re-open after being closed for 2 weeks during the Victorian School Holidays to allow construction of the RRL
- Early 2013: fitout of platforms 15/16 at Southern Cross completed
- 14 October 2013: rebuilt West Footscray Station opened
- 22 December 2013: platforms 15/16 at Southern Cross and approximately 5 kilometres of track from South Kensington opened
- 20 January 2014: new platforms 1/2 opened at Footscray
- 28 April 2014: new platforms 3/4 opened at Sunshine
- 16 July 2014: commissioning of the new dedicated V/line tracks between South Kensington and Sunshine
- 16 July 2014: new platforms 3/4 at Footscray opened
- 6 October 2014: first test train operated on the new line via Tarneit
- 19 April 2015: originally scheduled opening of the new route and stations at Tarneit and Wyndham Vale, but delayed due to a lack of V/Line trains
- 21 June 2015: completion including opening of Tarneit and Wyndham Vale stations.

== Impacts ==
=== Cost and benefits ===
In May 2010, the estimated cost was $4.3 billion, and economic benefits were estimated to be $6.2 billion.

In April 2011 the incoming Baillieu government stated it would cost closer to $5 billion and take two years longer to build. In July 2011 the cost was estimated at $5.3 billion with a completion date of 2016.

In the 2015/16 State Budget the final cost of the project was given as $3.65 billion, down from the previous estimate of $4.1 billion.

Before the project opened in June 2015, the PTV promotional pamphlet for the regional rail link stating a cost of $3.9 billion for the project.

However, the final cost of property acquisitions related to the project will not be fully known until December 2018, so this cost estimate may increase.

=== Legacy ===
All passenger trains on the Ballarat, Bendigo and Geelong lines use the Regional Rail Link from Sunshine to Melbourne, solving a significant part of the capacity problem, and the conflicts encountered when those services share tracks with metropolitan trains. The link allows more regional and metropolitan trains to run, which, combined with the purchase of new rolling stock, has helped provide additional peak hour passenger capacity on regional services, particularly those from Geelong and Ballarat, and freed up capacity on Melbourne suburban tracks to allow more trains to run.

However, far from providing a bypass of the suburban network for Geelong line trains, those services have become suburban trains on the Tarneit section of the RRL, being the only ones which can serve those stations. Tarneit station rapidly became the second busiest on the V/Line network after Southern Cross. That has worsened the chronic overcrowding on peak-hour Geelong trains, as well as slowing of journey times. As a result, there have been calls for the other three planned stations on the Tarneit section of the RRL to be constructed.

As part of the project, the partially-built platforms 15 and 16 at Southern Cross station were completed, which increased the number of trains the station can handle. However, no platforms were provided for RRL trains at North Melbourne station, which had been a major interchange point for regional passengers using northern suburban and City Loop trains, as well as the recently introduced Route 401 bus from North Melbourne to the hospital and university precincts. No reason was given for that decision, and after the RRL opened, passengers wanting to get to North Melbourne had to alight at Footscray or Southern Cross stations and catch another train.

=== Noise and pollution ===
Controversy emerged with the release of reports from the Victorian Environmental Protection Authority (EPA) which criticised the methodology and results contained in assessments submitted by the RRL team to former state planning minister, Justin Madden, as part of the project planning referral. EPA reports state, "in Footscray, for the most exposed residents, a vast majority of the population will experience chronic noise-induced sleep disturbance, with very significant proportions highly disturbed... For the most exposed residents in other areas, almost half the community will experience chronic noise-induced sleep disturbance." The reports also raised concerns about the Footscray Park Railway Reserve where, EPA predicted, the public would be exposed to dangerous levels of nitrogen dioxide from increased diesel train traffic. EPA noted that planned risk assessments had not been done by the Department of Transport. Madden had viewed EPA reports in September 2010, but ruled that an Environment Effects Statement (EES) was not required for Section-1 of the RRL project.

== Criticism ==
Despite the immediate advantage to commuters in the Wyndham Vale and Tarneit areas, there has been some disappointment regarding the irregular spacing of services at these stations.

Ballarat line passengers have been particularly upset about their services since the full opening of the RRL. Due to a rolling stock shortage, some Ballarat trains had fewer carriages than before, and timekeeping of services worsened, despite the promise of greater reliability after the RRL opened.

Following the opening of the Regional Rail Link, V/Line trains on the Ballarat line failed to meet punctuality targets for 14 consecutive months.

Despite Allen Garner, former CEO and COO of the Regional Rail Link Authority, saying there were "no new level crossings" along the whole Regional Rail Link route, three were left in place along the former Serviceton line in Deer Park, which Geelong line trains now travel on. The extra services introduced as a result of RRL meant the crossing gates were down for longer, which heavily increased traffic in the area and drew criticism from residents and lobby groups. However, when the Andrews government revised their 2014 election commitment of removing 50 of the most dangerous and congested level crossings to include a further 25 level crossings at the 2018 state election, all 3 of them got included in the Level Crossing Removal Project and were removed in 2022 and 2023.

In January 2016, V/Line suddenly withdrew half of its VLocity fleet due to wheel wear issues. The lack of rolling stock meant passengers were forced to use buses and the government ended up having to give passengers a whole month of free travel. An independent report done into the wheel wear issues found the major cause of the problem was tight curves on the RRL route, particularly on the North Melbourne flyover (NMFO), which was upgraded as part of RRL as a means of allowing V/line trains to travel through North Melbourne on a separate route to Metro trains

In May 2018, the Victorian Auditor-General completed an audit on the Regional Rail Link, titled "Assessing Benefits from the Regional Rail Link Project"

While acknowledging that the project has had significant benefits, some of them unexpected, the Auditor-General slammed the State Government's of the time, the former Victorian Department of Transport and the Regional Rail Link Authority for its mismanagement of the project, particularly in the planning stages.

He noted that the lack of any formal business case for the project made it extremely difficult to determine just what the benefits of the project were meant to be, and whether or not the RRL had lived up to the expectations set for it when the project was funded in 2009. He also said that planners had not adequately predicted how many people would use the RRL after its opening, and that the lines designed maximum capacity of 18 trains per hour would make it difficult to add the number of services which will be required in the future.

== See also ==
- Southern Sydney Freight Line – a similar project in Sydney separating suburban and freight services
- Regional Fast Rail project - a prior project aimed at improving regional rail services across Victoria
- Regional Rail Revival - a subsequent program to upgrade regional railway lines across Victoria
