= Rod Eddington =

Australian cricketer and businessman

Sir Rod Eddington AO FTSE
- Born: 2 January 1950 (age 76); Perth, Western Australia, Australia
- Education: Christ Church Grammar School
- Alma mater: University of Western Australia; University of Oxford
- Occupations: Director, News Corp
- Spouse: Young Sook Park
- Children: 2

Sir Roderick Ian Eddington (born 2 January 1950) is an Australian businessman.

He was first appointed to the board of News Corporation in 1999 and still serves on the News Corp board, as well as the board of another of Rupert Murdoch's companies, 21st Century Fox and the Herald & Weekly Times.

As of December 2020, Eddington is chair of Lion and serves on the board of its Japanese parent company, Kirin. He is also chair of JPMorgan Chase's Asia-Pacific Advisory Council, chair of Infrastructure Partnerships Australia, and a member of the Asia-Pacific Economic Cooperation Business Advisory Council.

He has served in other senior positions including as Chief Executive Officer of British Airways.

== Education and career ==
Rod Eddington
Cricket information
- Batting: Left-handed
- Bowling: Slow left-arm orthodox

Domestic team information
- Years: Team
- 1975–1976: Oxford University
- FC debut: 26 April 1975 Oxford University v Sussex
- Last FC: 23 June 1976 Oxford University v Sussex

Career statistics
Competition	First-class
Matches	8
Runs scored	130
Batting average	13.00
100s/50s	0/0
Top score	24
Balls bowled	600
Wickets	8
Bowling average	41.12
5 wickets in innings	0
10 wickets in match	0
Best bowling	3/48
Catches/stumpings	4/–
- Source: CricketArchive, 16 December 2009

Coming from a country area where there were no high schools, Eddington went to Perth in 1963 to attend Christ Church Grammar School. He studied engineering at the University of Western Australia and graduated with first class honours in 1972. He continued his studies at UWA and completed the degree of Master of Engineering. In 1974, Eddington was the Rhodes Scholar from Western Australia. He completed his DPhil in the Department of Engineering Science at the University of Oxford and played eight first-class cricket matches for Oxford University Cricket Club in 1975 and 1976. He was President of Vincent's Club in 1977.

Eddington joined Swire in 1979, working for its subsidiary Cathay Pacific, before being appointed managing director in 1992. Continuing his association with the airline industry; News Limited, subsidiary of News Corporation, appointed Eddington chairman of Ansett Australia in January 1997, four years before the airline failed. News Corp had taken control of the airline with TNT in 1979. Eddington was appointed Deputy Chairman of News Limited in September 1998. He was further promoted to the News Corporation board in September 1999.

=== British Airways CEO ===
Eddington replaced Bob Ayling as British Airways Chief Executive Officer on 2 May 2000. He reversed many of the policies of his predecessor in early 2001, such as the unpopular ethnic-art tailfins. He steered British Airways in the aftermath of the 11 September 2001 attacks on New York City and Washington, D.C.

In 2003, he retired Concorde, a move viewed as controversial. Eddington stepped down as chief executive officer of British Airways on 30 September 2005, after more than five years in the position. He then returned to Australia to take up a position as the head of the Victorian Major Events Association, succeeding Steve Vizard. Eddington was replaced by Willie Walsh in October 2005 after he had followed a six-month shadow position.

=== Board memberships ===
In February 2006, Eddington served as a non-executive board member of JPMorgan representing Australia and New Zealand.

As of 2018, he still served on the boards of News Corp and 21st Century Fox. In April 2019 he joined the board of News Corp's Herald & Weekly Times.

Eddington was appointed to the board of Lion in March 2011, and appointed chair in March 2012. He joined the parent company's board (Kirin) in March 2020, and holds these positions as of December 2020.

As of December 2020 Eddington was:

- chair of JPMorgan Chase's Asia-Pacific Advisory Council;
- chair of Infrastructure Partnerships Australia;
- a member of the Asia-Pacific Economic Cooperation Business Advisory Council; and
- President of the Australia Japan Business Cooperation Committee.

== Government reports ==
=== Transport Study in Britain ===
On 1 December 2006, Eddington published a UK government-sponsored report into the future of Britain's transport infrastructure. Known as the Eddington Transport Study, it spelled out a plan to improve road and rail networks, as a "crucial enabler of sustained productivity and competitiveness". In its conclusions, the report highlighted Britain's transport networks that provide the right connections, in the right places, to support the journeys that matter to economic performance. But roads in particular were in serious danger of becoming so congested, the economy would suffer.

At the launch of the report Eddington told journalists and transport industry representatives introducing road pricing to encourage drivers to drive less was an "economic no-brainer". There was, he said "no attractive alternative". It would cut congestion by half by 2025, and bring benefits to the British economy totalling £28b.

The report also called for a programme of improvements to existing road and rail networks, the expansion of key airports, and adoption of the general principle that travellers should pay for the external costs of the pollution and congestion their journeys cause.

=== Transport Study in Victoria, Australia ===
Eddington has since delivered a report to the Victorian Government of Australia, the East West Link Needs Assessment report, which was met with mixed reactions. Economic commentators criticised the cost-benefit ratios of Eddington's proposals, which on Eddington's own analysis were marginal at best.

== Honours ==
Eddington is a Council member of the Royal Institution of Australia.

Eddington received a British knighthood in 2005 for services to the aviation industry.

In 2012 he was appointed an Officer of the Order of Australia (AO) "for distinguished service to business and commerce through roles with a range of national and international economic, trade, infrastructure development and transport organisations", and was also elected a Fellow of the Australian Academy of Technological Sciences and Engineering.

In 2015 he was awarded the Grand Cordon of the Order of the Rising Sun by the Japanese Government for his "contribution to strengthening the economic relations between Australia and Japan".

Business positions
Preceded by Bob Ayling	CEO of British Airways; 2000–2005	Succeeded by Willie Walsh
