= Sunbus =

Bus operator in Queensland, Australia

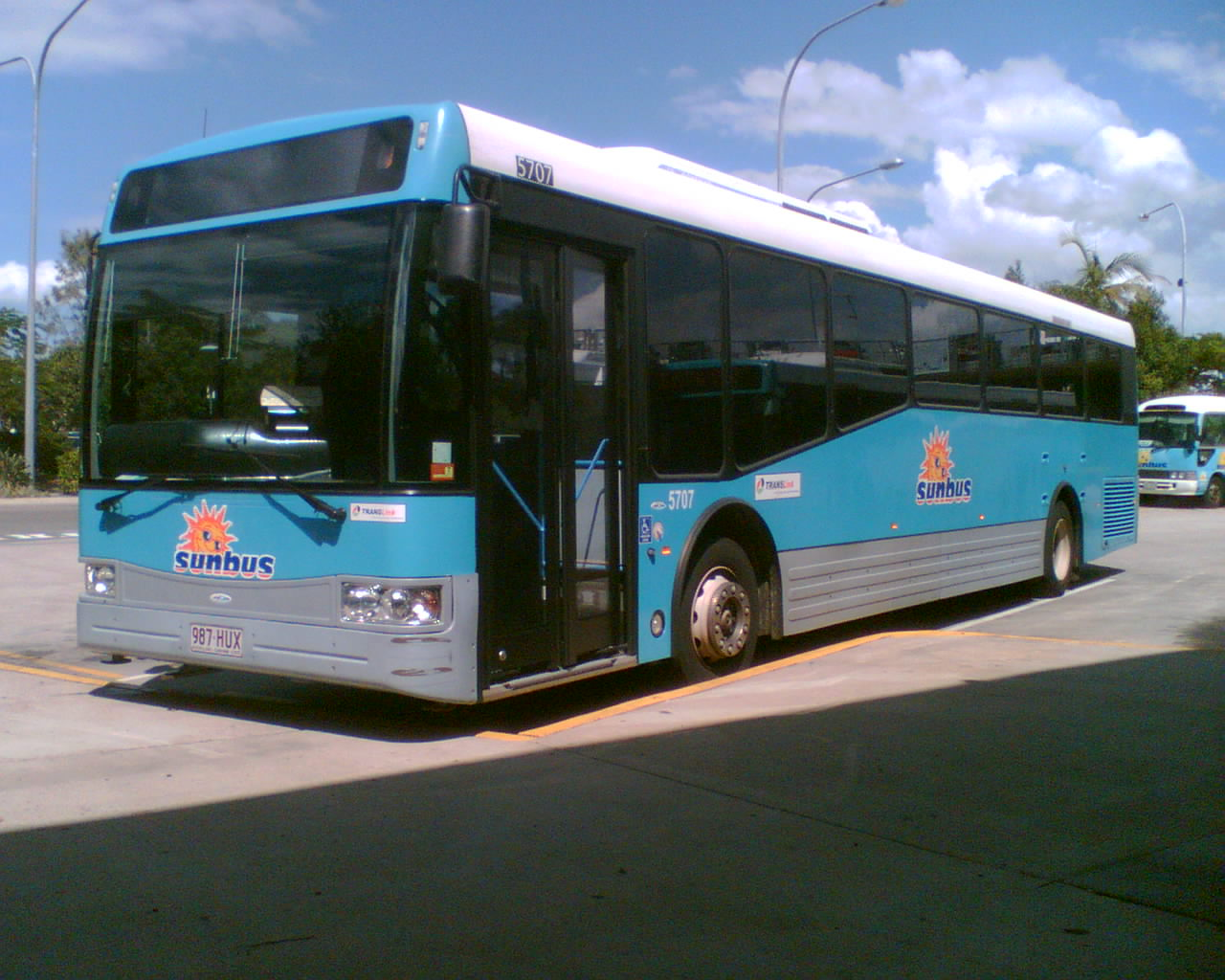
- Sunbus Sunshine Coast Bustech bodied Volvo B12BLE at Sunshine Plaza in June 2006
- Parent: Kinetic
- Founded: 1995
- Defunct: 2022
- Service area: Cairns; Magnetic Island; Rockhampton; Sunshine Coast; Townsville; Toowoomba
- Service type: Bus operator
- Routes: 200 as of 2022
- Depots: Caloundra; Garbutt; Glenmore; Marcoola; Nelly Bay; Smithfield; Wilsonton
- Fleet: 275 (July 2022)
- Website: www.sunbus.com.au https://www.wearekinetic.com/

Sunbus was an Australian bus operator in the Australian state of Queensland. It operated in 5 regional areas across the state under contract to the Government of Queensland under the Translink banner. As of 2022 Sunbus has changed its name as part of a business re-brand by the parent company, Kinetic. Sunbus has now been dissolved into the Kinetic brand with its fleet of buses reflecting this change.

== History ==
In 1995, Harry Blundred, the proprietor of Thames Transit in the United Kingdom, was awarded the operating rights to route services in a number of regions in Queensland following the state government deciding to put the operation of these services out to tender. Sunbus were awarded the rights to operate services in the Cairns, Ipswich, Rockhampton, Sunshine Coast and Townsville regions. As part of the deal, Sunbus was also responsible for the operation of school bus services in the region, however these were sold in 1997 to fellow British bus operator Stagecoach.

In January 2000, the Ipswich business was sold to the Pulitano Group and in September 2003 Hagan's, Bus Service, Toowoomba was purchased and rebranded Garden City Sunbus and was based at 487 Greenwattle Street, Wilsonton. This was sold in April 2009 to the Pulitano Group.

In April 2008, Blundred sold the remaining Sunbus operations to Transit Australia Group.

In November 2008, Magnetic Island Bus Services was purchased and in April 2010 the Townsville operation was expanded with the acquisition of Hermit Park Bus Service.

In April 2019, Transit Australia Group was purchased by AATS Group, parent company of Skybus and majority owned by OPTrust. In August 2019, AATS Group was rebranded the Kinetic Group.

In late 2022, Sunbus was officially branded as KINETIC with all new advertising now showing the Kinetic Brand. All new buses will display the Kinetic logo with the current fleet of Sunbus slowly being updated to reflect the new brand name. The current website for Sunbus will stay active until early 2023 before it will be deactivated, directing customers to the new Kinetic website.

== Operations ==
Sunbus operated as:

- Sunbus Cairns
- Sunbus Magnetic Island
- Sunbus Rockhampton
- Sunbus Sunshine Coast
- Sunbus Townsville
- Garden City Sunbus

== Fleet ==
As at July 2022, the fleet consisted of 275 buses. When Sunbus commenced it introduced a large number of Mercedes-Benz Vario midibuses. These were replaced by Bustech bodied Volvo B7RLEs, B12BLEs, Bustech MDis and XDis. Fleet livery was light blue.
