= Kinetic Sunshine Coast =

Bus operator on the Sunshine Coast, Australia

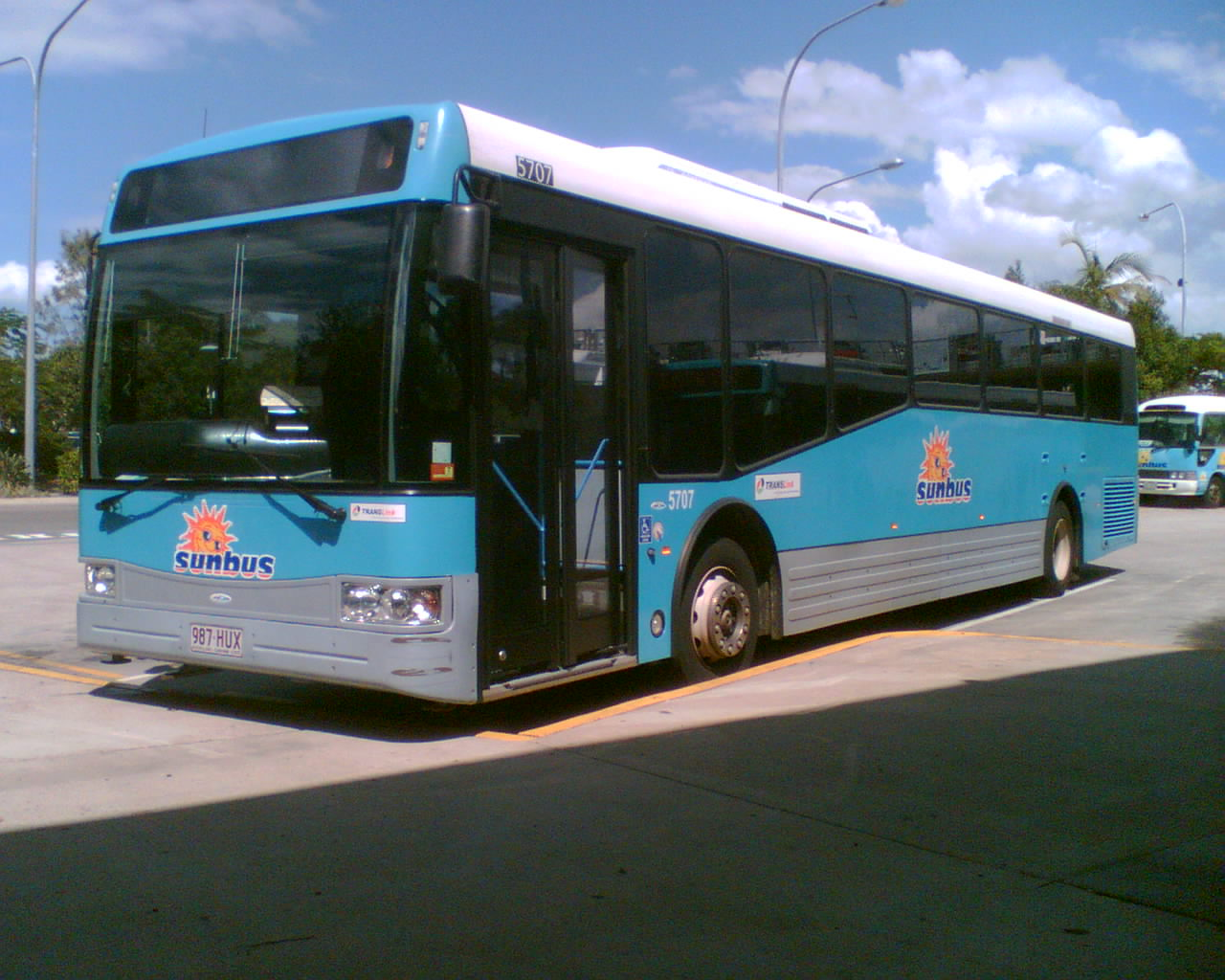
- Bustech bodied Volvo B12BLE at Sunshine Plaza in June 2006
- Formerly: Sunbus Sunshine Coast
- Parent: Kinetic
- Founded: 1995
- Service area: Sunshine Coast
- Service type: Bus operator
- Routes: 30
- Hubs: Kawana Shoppingworld; Noosa Heads; Noosa Junction; Sunshine Plaza; University of the Sunshine Coast Landsborough; Nambour
- Depots: Caloundra; Marcoola
- Fleet: 127 (January 2025)
- Website: www.wearekinetic.com

Kinetic Sunshine Coast, formerly Sunbus Sunshine Coast, is a bus operator on the Sunshine Coast, Queensland, Australia. Operating services under contract to Translink, it is a subsidiary of Kinetic.

== History ==
In 1995, Harry Blundred, the proprietor of Thames Transit in the United Kingdom, was awarded the operating rights to route services in the Sunshine Coast region, taking over the services around Caloundra and Maroochydore that had been provided by Sunshine Coast Coaches. In 1996, Tewantin Bus Service was purchased with the services between Maroochydore and Noosa.

As part of the deal, Sunbus was also responsible for the operation of school bus services in the region, however these were sold in 1997 to fellow British bus operator Stagecoach.

In April 2008, Blundred sold Sunbus Sunshine Coast along with the other Sunbus operations to Transit Australia Group.

In April 2019, Transit Australia Group was purchased by AATS Group, parent company of Skybus and majority owned by OPTrust. In August 2019, AATS Group was rebranded Kinetic.

In 2022, the Sunbus brand was retired in favour of Kinetic.

== Services ==
Kinetic operates 30 services under contract to Translink.

== Fleet ==
Sunbus introduced a fleet of Mercedes-Benz Vario midibuses and Toyota Coaster minibuses. These have since been replaced by Bustech bodied Volvo B12BLEs and Bustech MDi and XDis.

As of January 2025, the fleet consisted of 127 buses. Sunbus introduced a light blue livery. This has been replaced by the Translink white and green livery.

== Depots ==
Kinetic operate depots in Caloundra and Marcoola.
