= Kinetic Rockhampton =

Bus operator in Rockhampton, Australia

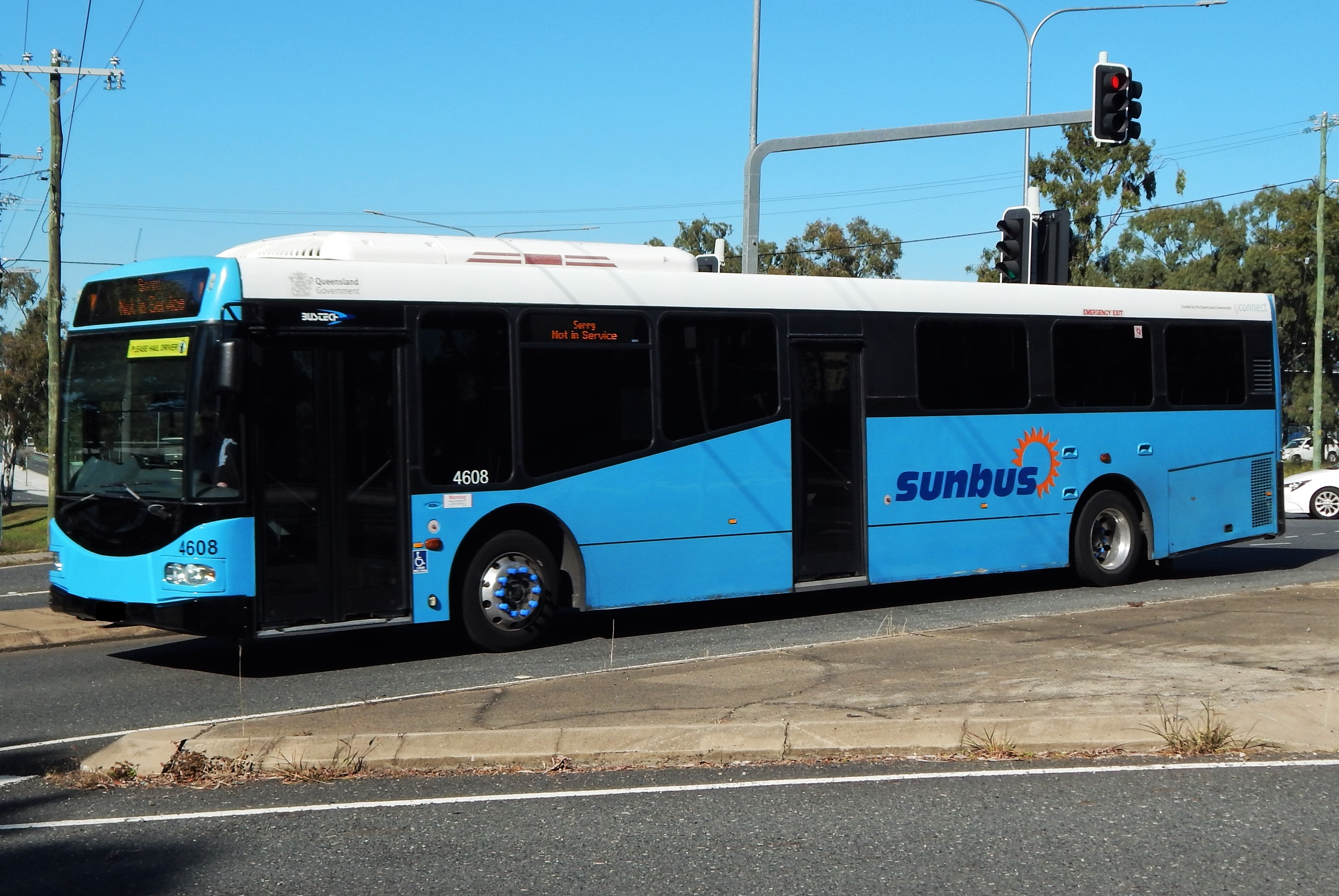
- Bustech XDi in June 2022
- Formerly: Sunbus Rockhampton; Capricorn Sunbus; Rocky Transit
- Parent: Kinetic
- Founded: May 1995
- Headquarters: Glenmore
- Service area: Rockhampton
- Service type: Bus operator
- Hubs: Central Queensland University; Stockland Rockhampton
- Depots: 1
- Fleet: 19 (January 2025)
- Website: www.wearekinetic.com

Kinetic Rockhampton, previously Sunbus Rockhampton, Capricorn Sunbus and Rocky Transit, is the principal bus operator in Rockhampton, Queensland. Operating services under contract to Translink, it is a subsidiary of Kinetic.

== History ==
In May 1995, Harry Blundred, the proprietor of Thames Transit in the United Kingdom, commenced operating the route services in Rockhampton formerly operated by Rockhampton City Council. Initially branded Rocky Transit it was later renamed Capricorn Sunbus.

As part of the deal, Sunbus was also responsible for the operation of school bus services in the region, however these were sold in 1997 to fellow British bus operator Stagecoach.

In April 2008, Blundred sold Capricorn Sunbus along with the other Sunbus operations to Transit Australia Group.

In April 2019, Transit Australia Group was purchased by AATS Group, parent company of Skybus and majority owned by OPTrust. In August 2019, AATS Group was rebranded Kinetic.

In 2022, the Sunbus brand was retired in favour of Kinetic.

== Services ==
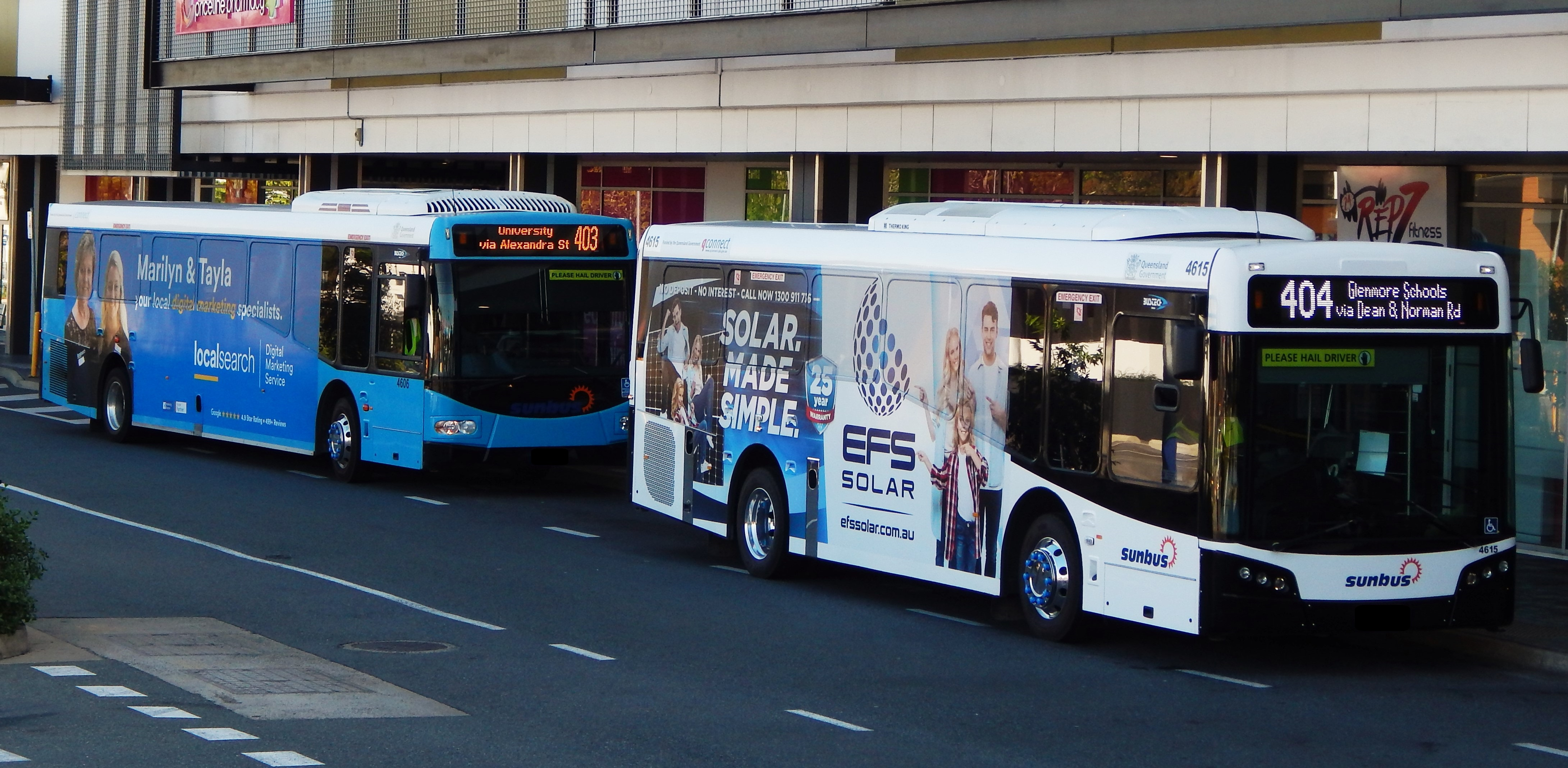
Bustech bodied buses at Stockland Rockhampton in July 2022

Kinetic operates routes in most Rockhampton suburbs including the northern suburb of Parkhurst, the eastern suburbs of Lakes Creek and Koongal, the southern suburbs of The Range and Allenstown and the western suburb of West Rockhampton. The area with the best service coverage is the busy North Rockhampton arterial road Musgrave Street in North Rockhampton.

== Fleet ==
As of January 2025, the fleet consisted of 19 buses, primarily Bustech MDis and XDis. The fleet livery is light blue. It commenced operations with a fleet of ex Public Transport Corporation Ansair bodied Volvo B59s. These were replaced by a fleet of Mercedes-Benz Varios.

== Depot ==
The depot is located in the suburb of Kawana
