= Kinetic Cairns =

Australian bus company

- Formerly: Sunbus Cairns; Marlin Coast Sunbus
- Parent: Kinetic
- Founded: 1995
- Headquarters: Smithfield
- Service area: Cairns
- Service type: Bus operator
- Routes: 18
- Hubs: Cairns City; Palm Cove; Smithfield Shopping Centre; Stockland Cairns; Westcourt
- Depots: 1
- Fleet: 59 (January 2025)

Kinetic Cairns, formerly Sunbus Cairns and Marlin Coast Sunbus, is the principal bus operator in Cairns, Queensland, Australia. Operating services under contract to Translink, it is a subsidiary of Kinetic.

== History ==
In 1995, Harry Blundred, the proprietor of Thames Transit in the United Kingdom, was awarded the operating rights to route services in Cairns by the Government of Queensland. It initially was a joint venture with Beach Bus and West Cairns Bus Service, but Blundred took full control shortly after.

As part of the deal, Sunbus was also responsible for the operation of school bus services in the region, however these were sold in 1997 to fellow British bus operator Stagecoach.

In April 2008, Blundred sold Marlin Coast Sunbus along with the other Sunbus operations to Transit Australia Group.

In April 2019, Transit Australia Group was purchased by AATS Group, parent company of Skybus and majority owned by OPTrust. In August 2019, AATS Group was rebranded Kinetic.

This is a separate operation to Love's Bus Service Cairns which is also owned by Kinetic.

In 2022, the Sunbus brand was retired in favour of Kinetic.

== Services ==
Sunbus operates from Palm Cove and Trinity Beach in the north, and as far south as Gordonvale and Edmonton.

- 110 Palm Cove to Cairns Central
- 111 Kewarra Beach to Cairns Central
- 112 Yorkeys Knob to Smithfield
- 113 Smithfield to Cairns Central (via Dunne Rd)
- 120 Smithfield to Cairns Central (via Holloways Beach)
- 121 Redlynch to Cairns Central
- 122 Redlynch to James Cook University
- 123 James Cook University to Cairns Central
- 130 Manunda to Cairns Central (via Greenslopes St)
- 131 Manunda to Cairns Central (via Collins Ave)
- 133 Earlville to Cairns City bus station
- 140 Edmonton to Cairns Central
- 141 Coconut Village to Cairns Central
- 142 Edmonton to Cairns Central
- 143 Mt Sheridan to Cairns Central
  - 143 Mt Sheridan to Cairns Central (via Bruce Highway)
  - 143W Mt Sheridan to Cairns Central (via Bayview Heights)
- 150 Gordonvale to Cairns Central
  - 150 Gordonvale to Cairns Central
  - 150E Gordonvale to Cairns Central (via Edmonton and White Rock)

== Fleet ==
As of January 2025, the fleet consisted of 59 buses, primarily Bustech bodied Volvo B12BLEs, Bustech MDi and XDis. The fleet livery is light blue.
