= Thames Transit =

Former Oxford bus operator

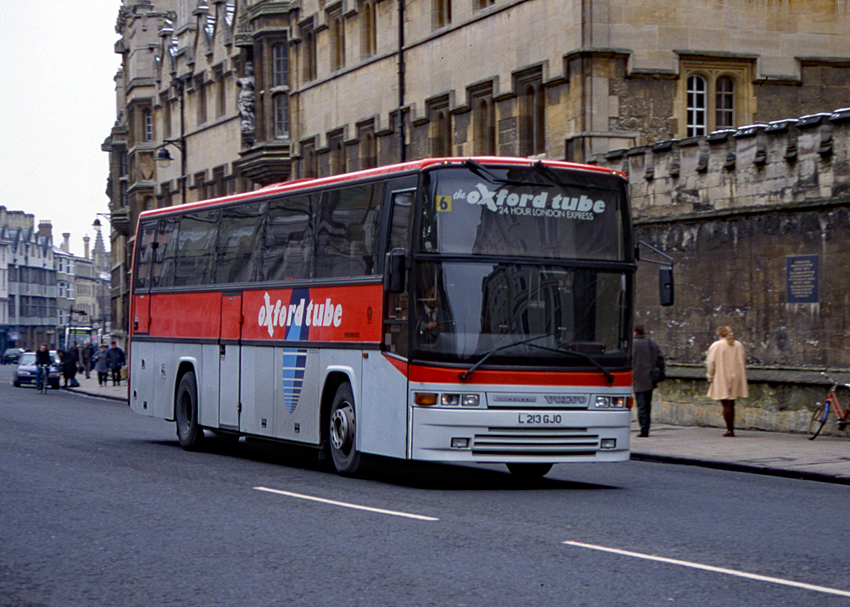
- Volvo B10M-60 on Oxford Tube service
- Parent: Harry Blundred
- Founded: March 1987; 38 years ago
- Ceased operation: July 1997; 27 years ago
- Service area: Oxfordshire

Thames Transit was a bus and coach company which operated in the Oxford area. As well as running a number of local services, it also ran a regular service to London (via the M40 motorway) under the Oxford Tube brand. It was sold in July 1997 to Stagecoach, and traded as Stagecoach in Oxfordshire. As of 2022 it is part of Stagecoach West.

== Foundation ==
Thames Transit was founded in March 1987 by Harry Blundred, a former bus driver and controller, who led a management buyout of Devon General during the privatisation of the National Bus Company in August 1986. Blundred started Thames Transit from scratch in Oxfordshire with buses cascaded from his Devon General operation on two routes:

- bus route 1 between the Blackbird Leys housing estate and Oxford city centre
- coach route 100, branded the Oxford Tube, running scheduled express services between Oxford and London

The firm struggled under intense competition from the incumbent City of Oxford Motor Services, but ultimately succeeded in increasing patronage through a series of innovative approaches. Among these, the use of branding was particularly successful in the case of the Oxford Tube and Blackbird Flyer. Later branding efforts were not always so successful, and Oxford Tube is the only brand name to survive today.

Competition remained fierce and in the mid-1990s a price war erupted, with for example a 12-journey ticket between Oxford and London costing just £15. The price war was abandoned before these unsustainable fares could drive either company out of business.

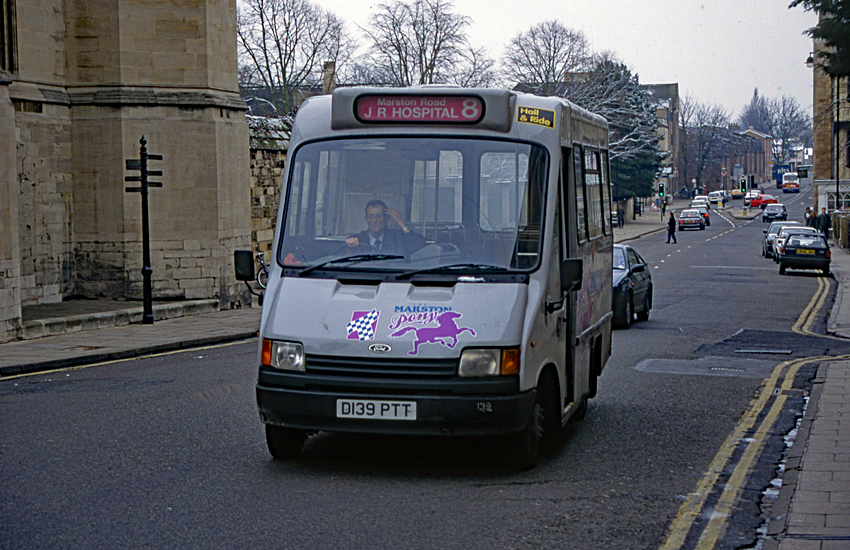
Ford Transit Mellor with Marston Pony branding

The firm is noted for introducing minibuses to Oxford. The original vehicles on local routes were sixteen seater Ford Transits, colloquially called Snoopys for their resemblance at the front to the cartoon character. The buses featured a single front entrance and exit door and room for four standing passengers. They eased initial recruitment concerns because drivers did not have to hold a full PSV licence to drive them. The primary reason behind their use, however, was that Blundred felt greater profitability could be gained through running small buses at a high frequency, rather than running larger buses half-empty at a low frequency.

== Expansion ==
In 1989 Thames Transit expanded by buying South Midland, the former country area of The City of Oxford Motor Services, primarily operating rural routes in Oxfordshire. This acquisition strengthened Thames Transit's hand against City of Oxford Motor Services, providing it with several routes where it was the sole provider.

The company then grew significantly in the early 1990s, introducing larger Mercedes-Benz minibuses with 32-seat capacity and buying new vehicles for the Oxford Tube coach service, which was starting to perform well against rival City of Oxford's Citylink service. City of Oxford itself had been forced to spread its defensive tactics following the South Midland acquisition, and this allowed Thames Transit to grow.

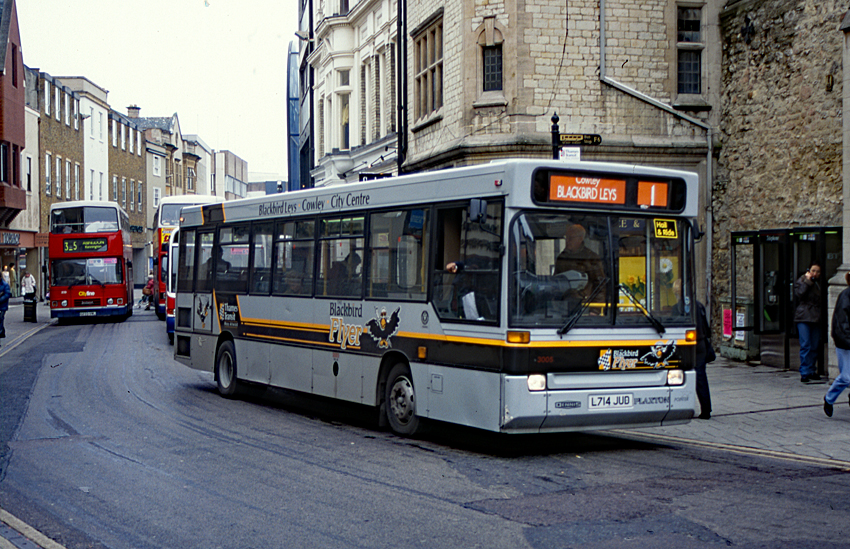
Dennis Dart with Blackbird Flyer branding

In 1994 the firm bought its first midibuses: a fleet of 9.8 metre step-entrance Dennis Darts. Thirteen were bought for the original number 1 route, and new branding was applied, adorning the buses with a giant blackbird called 'Bertie' and the service named 'The Blackbird Flyer'. Continuing the minibus philosophy, the buses were scheduled every four or five minutes. There was a noticeable shift of traffic away from City of Oxford as passengers responded to Thames Transit's new branding and vehicles.

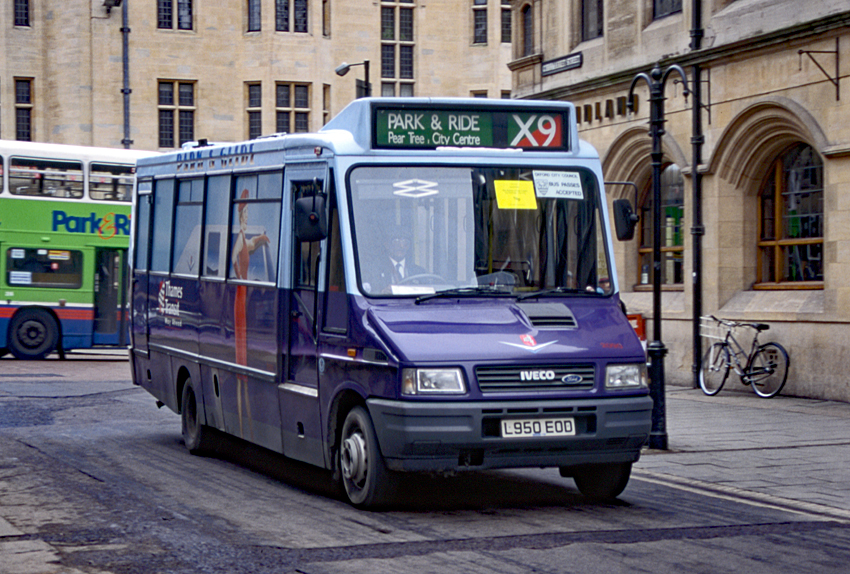
Iveco 59-12 midibus in Park and Glide livery

The new vehicle type and the use of branding proved to be a precursor for other route changes; the company later incrementally introduced the Rose Hill Runner (number 3 route running from Rose Hill to Oxford city centre), City Cavalier (number 7 route: Barton to Cutteslowe via Headington, city centre and Summertown), Kidlington Cavalier (number 7A running originally from Kidlington to St Aldates), Carousel (10/10A "city circle" service running in both directions from the city centre to Summertown, Marston, Headington, Wood Farm, Cowley and back to the city centre), and Witney Weaver (100, Oxford to Witney and Carterton), as brands for existing routes which were upgraded to new Dennis Darts. It also introduced branding on the X9 Park and Ride service running between Oxford's largest P&R, Redbridge, and the northern Pear Tree Park & Ride. The branding in this case was 'Gloria Glide', with buses featuring a picture of a six-foot female chauffeur and the slogan 'Park & Ride with Gloria Glide' – which generated accusations of sexism by the University of Oxford.

== Acquisition ==
In 1994 the Go-Ahead Group bought City of Oxford Motor Services, significantly strengthening its competitiveness. Following an effective rebranding and new vehicles to replace the older vehicles which were looking somewhat jaded against Thames Transit's improved services, City of Oxford launched 'New Fare Deals' in March 1995, symbolically referring to Thames Transit's entry into the city. New Fare Deals reduced fares on the routes where the two providers competed, while City of Oxford withdrew from less profitable routes to increase frequencies on the most lucrative and competitive corridors. Combined with new and spacious vehicles on some routes and staff poaching tactics, this significantly weakened Thames Transit's competitive strength.

At this time Thames Transit introduced two new branded routes, The Wood Farm Woodman and The Marston Pony, in direct competition with long-established City of Oxford routes. Both routes were unsuccessful – partly because they used tired vehicles but also because they failed to run frequently enough given the attenuation of staffing under the pressure of the bus war with City of Oxford.

The bus war ended in autumn 1996, with both firms withdrawing from routes and increasing fares. Thames Transit withdrew its Park & Ride service and the Wood Farm Woodman and Marston Pony routes. It switched coaches scheduled between Oxford and Heathrow Airport under a short-lived express Heathrow Tube service, back to a longer cross country Heathrow route numbered the 390, which failed to compete with City of Oxford's long-established express Citylink X70 service to Heathrow (later rebranded The Airline).

In July 1997 Harry Blundred sold Thames Transit to Stagecoach. The company was rebranded under the Stagecoach name, using Stagecoach Oxford and then Stagecoach in Oxfordshire on local routes but retaining the Oxford Tube brand name on the London express service.

In 1995 Blundred founded the Transit Australia Group, which operated the Sunbus business in the state of Queensland operating services in Cairns, Ipswich, Rockhampton, Sunshine Coast and Townsville. Blundred retained the business until April 2008.

As part of the deal Sunbus was also responsible for the operation of school bus services. These were sold in 1997 to Stagecoach.
