= Kinetic Townsville =

Bus operator in Townsville, Australia

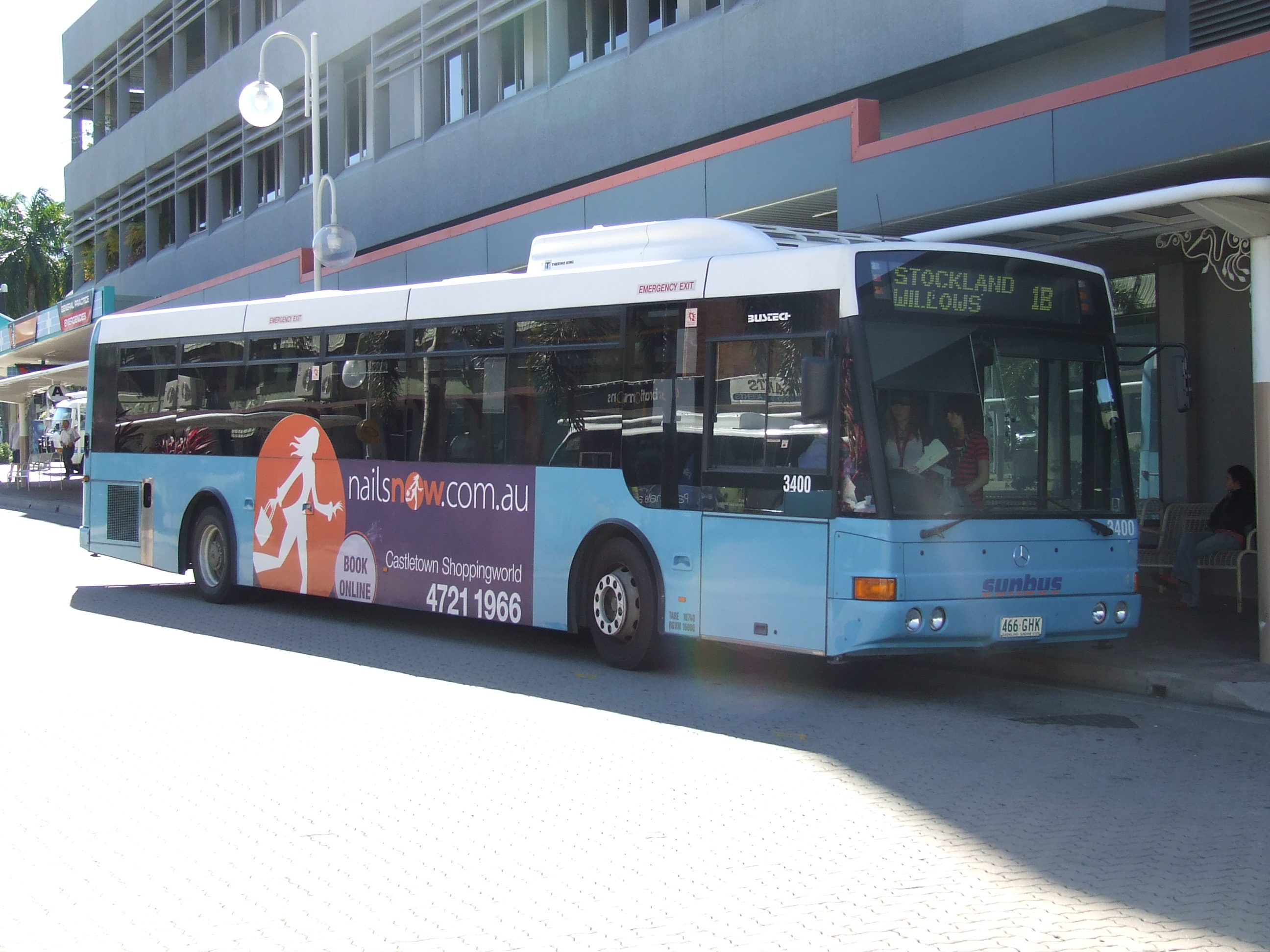
- Bustech bodied Mercedes-Benz O405NH in July 2007
- Formerly: Sunbus Townsville
- Parent: Kinetic
- Founded: 1995
- Headquarters: Garbutt
- Service area: Townsville
- Service type: Bus operator
- Routes: 15
- Hubs: Castletown Shoppingworld; James Cook University; Stockland Townsville; Townsville CBD; Townsville Hospital; Willows Shopping Centre
- Depots: 1
- Fleet: 81 (January 2025)
- Website: www.wearekinetic.com

Kinetic Townsville, formerly Sunbus Townsville, is the principal bus operator in Townsville, Queensland, Australia. Operating services under contract to Translink, it is a subsidiary of Kinetic.

== History ==
In April 1996, Harry Blundred, the proprietor of Thames Transit in the United Kingdom, began operating the route services in Cairns.

As part of the deal, Sunbus was also responsible for the operation of school bus services in the region, but these were sold in 1997 to another British bus operator, Stagecoach.

In April 2008, Blundred sold Marlin Coast Sunbus along with the other Sunbus operations to Transit Australia Group. In April 2010, the operation expanded with the acquisition of Hermit Park Bus Service.

In April 2019, Transit Australia Group was purchased by AATS Group, the parent company of Skybus and majority-owned by OPTrust. In August 2019, AATS Group was rebranded Kinetic.

In 2022, the Sunbus brand was retired in favour of Kinetic.

== Services ==
Kinetic operates services from Pallarenda in the north, Kelso and Stuart in the south and Kirwan and Thuringowa Central in the west. The area with the largest service coverage is the suburbs of Annandale and Douglas.

== Fleet ==
As at January 2025, the fleet consisted of 81 buses.
