= University of the Sunshine Coast bus station =

Bus station in Queensland, Australia

University of the Sunshine Coast
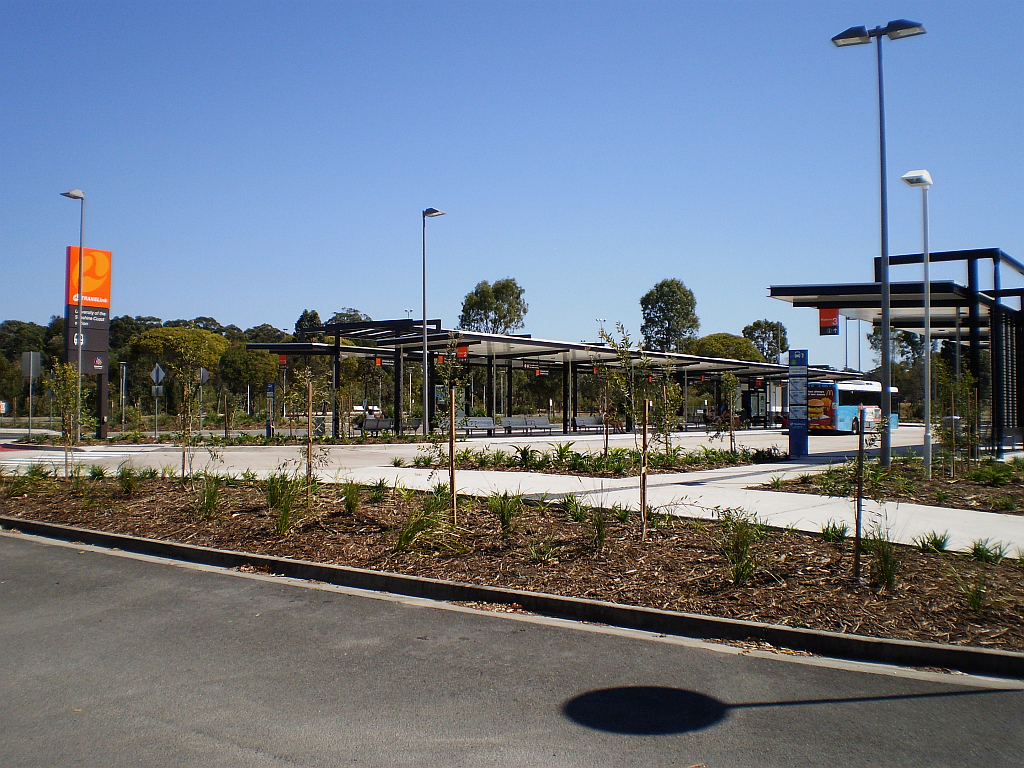

General information
- Location: University Way, Sippy Downs
- Coordinates: 26°43′06.4″S 153°03′41.5″E
- Operator: Translink
- Platforms: 3

Construction
- Parking: Park'n'Ride
- Accessible: Yes

Other information
- Fare zone: Zone 6

History
- Opened: 26 June 2009
Location

University of the Sunshine Coast is a bus station operated by Translink. It opened in 2009 and serves the University of the Sunshine Coast (UniSC or UC) in the Sunshine Coast suburb of Sippy Downs. It is a ground level station, featuring one island platform with two faces.
