= Kinetic Gold Coast =

Bus operator on the Gold Coast, Australia

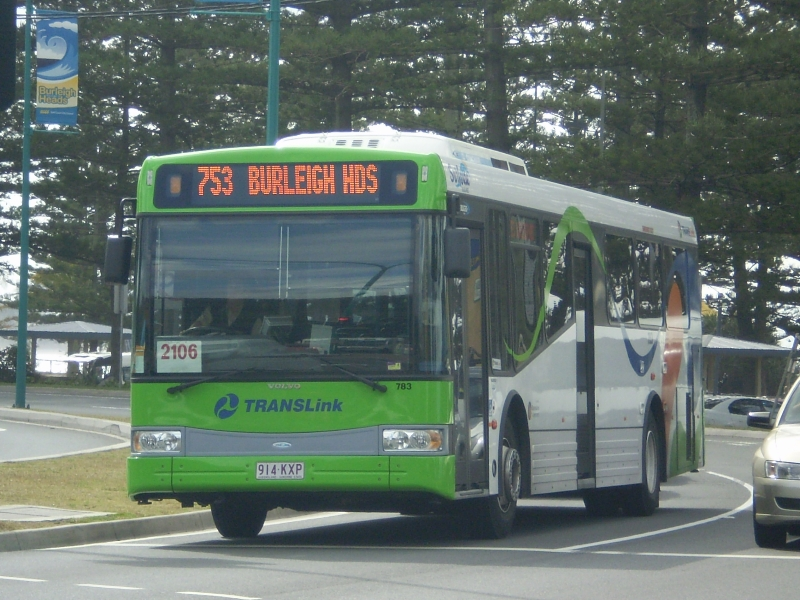
- Translink liveried Bustech bodied Volvo B7RLE in August 2008
- Formerly: Surfside Buslines
- Parent: Kinetic
- Founded: 1967
- Service area: Gold Coast; Tweed Valley
- Service type: Bus operator
- Routes: 74
- Hubs: Southport bus station Broadbeach South light rail station Gold Coast Airport; Harbour Town Shopping Centre; Pacific Fair; Pines Shopping Centre; Tweed Heads
- Stations: Beenleigh; Coomera; Helensvale; Nerang; Robina; Varsity Lakes
- Depots: Coomera; Ernest; Molendinar; Tweed Heads
- Fleet: 453 (January 2025)
- Website: www.wearekinetic.com

Kinetic Gold Coast, formerly Surfside Buslines, is an Australian bus operator on the Gold Coast in Queensland. It operates services under contract to Translink in Queensland and in the adjoining Tweed Valley of New South Wales under contract to Transport for NSW. It is a subsidiary of Kinetic.

== History ==
Former Surfside logo

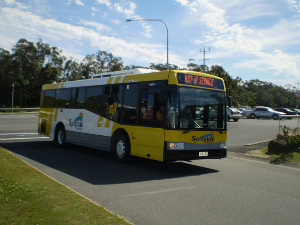
Bustech MDi in the old blue & yellow livery in August 2008

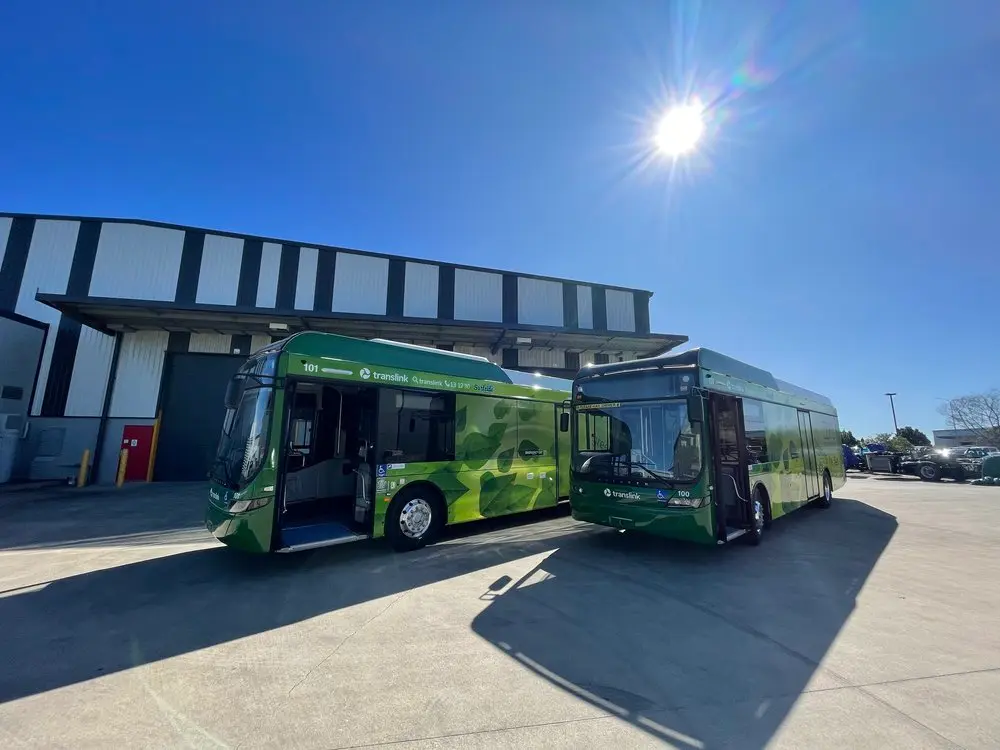
Volgren bodied BYDs in 2022

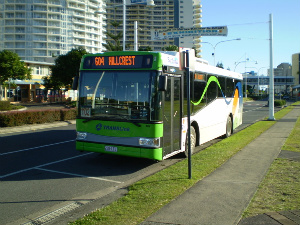
Translink liveried Bustech MDi in Tweed Heads in August 2008

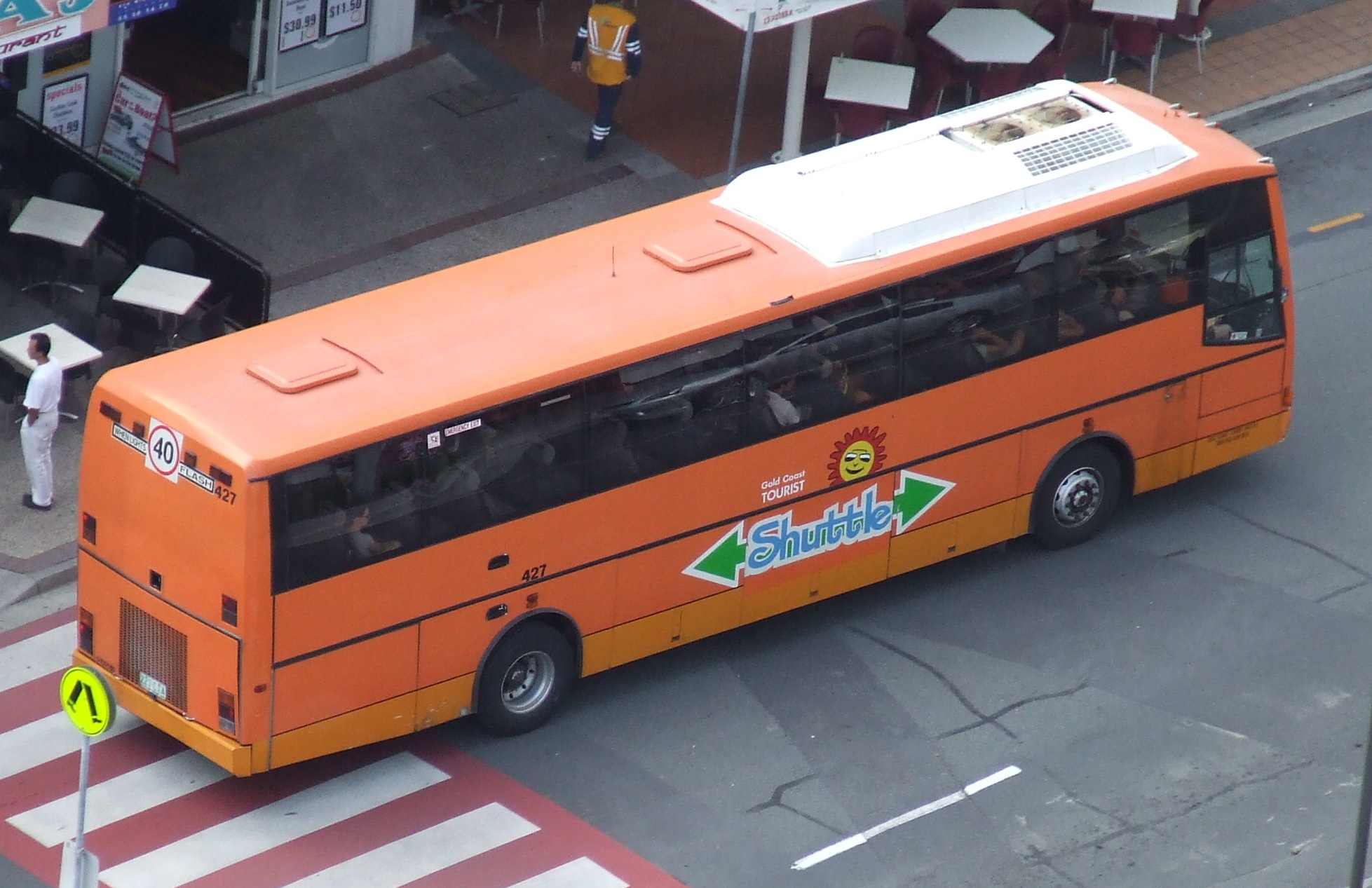
Gold Coast Tourist Shuttle liveried MotorCoach Australia in January 2008

Until June 1989, Surfside was owned by Greyhound owner Russell Penfold when it was sold to Joe and Tony Calabro with 56 buses.

In 1993, Tweed Bus Service was purchased with 51 buses, followed by Gold Coast Citybus on 21 February 1995, Springbrook-Mudgeeraba Bus Service with approximately twelve buses on 1 March 1995,

Gold Coast Tourist Shuttle was purchased in September 1998 and Coomera Bus Lines in May 2001.

In 2008, the Calabro's consolidated their bus companies under the Transit Australia Group brand

Gold Coast Tourist Shuttle was sold to Skybus and rebranded as Skybus Gold Coast in November 2017.

In April 2019, Transit Australia Group was purchased by AATS Group, the parent company of SkyBus and majority owned by OPTrust. In August 2019, AATS Group rebranded Kinetic.

In 2022, the Surfside Buslines brand was retired in favour of Kinetic.

== Services ==
In Queensland, Surfside operates services from Beenleigh on the north of the Gold Coast as far south as Tweed Heads just over the border with New South Wales. In New South Wales it operates services from Tweed Heads as far south as Murwillumbah and Pottsville.

== Ticketing ==
In Queensland, Translink's go card ticketing system applies. In New South Wales, Transport for NSW ticketing applies.

== Fleet ==
In the 1970s, Surfside built up a fleet of Leyland Nationals. In the 1980s some Volvo B59 and Volvo B10Rs and Volvo B10ML articulateds were purchased. Following the sale to the Calabros, large numbers of ex ACTION Volvo B58s, MAN SL200s and SG192 articulateds were purchased to replace the Leyland Nationals. Amongst the buses purchased with Tweed Bus Service were Leyland Tigers and Hinos. To replace the Gold Coast Citybus fleet, ex Brisbane Transport and TransAdelaide Volvo B59s and ex State Transit Authority Mercedes-Benz O305s were purchased.

From the mid-1990s, Surfside began to standardise on Mercedes-Benz and Volvo chassis for its route bus fleet and Hinos for school buses. Initially bodied by external suppliers, since 1998 all buses have been bodied by the Calabro's Bustech.

Since 2008 all purchases have been Bustech MDi and XDis integral buses. Surfside received a steady flow of second hand buses including from the Calabro's Sydney operations, Busabout and Hawkesbury Valley Buses.

Since 2008, all deliveries and repaints have been in Translink colours, with blue body, green ends, a green and blue wavy stripe down each side and the Translink logo toward the back. A modified version is applied to the vehicles used in New South Wales to facilitate easy transfer between depots, albeit without the Translink decals. The Gold Coast Tourist Shuttle coaches are painted orange.

Since 2013 Surfside Buslines have also received eight Bustech CDis double deck buses.

As at January 2025, the fleet consisted of 453 buses and coaches. Vehicles are registered in both New South Wales and Queensland, although the fleet is utilised interchangeably, particularly the school bus fleet. The only restriction is the different ticket machines used in each state.

Under Russell Penfold ownership, Surfside had an orange with blue stripe livery. The Calabros introduced a blue with yellow livery.

In 2022, 10 new Volgren Optimus buses were acquired by Surfside Bus lines, out of 20 to be introduced in Queensland the same year. They use BYD D9RA chassis, and use battery electric bus technology.
