= Transit Australia Group =

- Parent: Kinetic Group
- Founded: 2008
- Ceased operation: April 2019
- Headquarters: Robina
- Service type: Bus services
- Operator: Sunbus; Surfside Buslines
- Website: tagroup.net.au/

Transit Australia Group (TAG) was one of Australia's leading mass transit specialists headquartered on the Gold Coast in Queensland.

The company operated Sunbus (Sunbus Cairns, Sunbus Magnetic Island, Sunbus Rockhampton, Sunbus Sunshine Coast, Sunbus Townsville), Surfside Buslines and Bustech with a unique end-to-end mass transit offering including bus design and manufacturing, urban network design, planning and operation, and workforce development and training.

TAG was dissolved after being acquired by AATS Group (now Kinetic) in April 2019 and Sunbus and Surfside Buslines are now owned and operated by Kinetic, who also owns Skybus. Bustech was not included in the sale to AATS Group.

== History ==
After selling their long established south-western Sydney bus operation to Westbus in June 1989, Joe and Tony Calabro purchased Surfside Buslines from Greyhound owner Russell Penfold in October 1989 with 56 buses. The Surfside operation grew with the Tweed Bus Service (1993), Gold Coast Citybus (February 1995), Gold Coast Tourist Shuttle (September 1998) and Coomera Bus Lines (May 2001) operations purchased. The Calabros also formed Bustech, a bus manufacturing business. In April 2008, the Sunbus operations were purchased from Transit Australia and all of the Calabro's Queensland operations consolidated under the Transit Australia Group. In November 2008 Magnetic Island Bus Services was purchased and in April 2009 the Sunbus Toowoomba operation sold to the Bus Queensland group. In April 2010, the Townsville operation was expanded with the acquisition of Hermit Park Bus Service.

In 2011, Bustech successfully launched Australia’s first double decker (CDi model) bus for urban transport since 1973. In 2015, the manufacturing arm also attracted international attention with the unveiling of Australia’s first electric bus designed, engineered and manufactured domestically.

In 2016, TAG formed a strategic alliance with Precision Components in Adelaide to develop an advanced manufacturing facility to produce next-generation, environmentally friendly diesel and electric buses.

In November 2017, the Gold Coast Tourist Shuttle (GCTS) business was sold to Skybus and rebranded as Skybus Gold Coast.

In February 2018 Mobike, in partnership with Transit Australia Group and Good Cycles, distributed 200 dockless shared bikes around Surfers Paradise and Broadbeach with the number expected to grow to 2,000 by the time of the Commonwealth Games in April.

In April 2019, TAG was purchased by AATS Group (now Kinetic Group), parent company of Skybus and majority owned by OPTrust. Bustech was not included in the sale.
