= Translink (Queensland) =

Public transport agency in Queensland, Australia

Agency overview
- Formed: November 2012
- Preceding agency: Translink Transit Authority
- Jurisdiction: Queensland
- Agency executive: Sally Stannard, Director-General (Department of Transport and Main Roads)
- Parent department: Department of Transport and Main Roads
- Website: translink.com.au

Translink is a public transport agency and a division of the Department of Transport and Main Roads in Queensland, Australia. Translink was first established by the Queensland Government in June 2003 to coordinate train, bus, ferry and tram services. Translink works with Brisbane Airtrain, Transport for Brisbane, RiverCity Ferries, Queensland Rail and other operators to provide services. Translink operates an integrated ticketing system across Queensland to allow the use of one ticket on multiple services.

In July 2008, Translink devolved from being a division of the former Queensland Transport to the more autonomous Translink Transit Authority, before returning to management under the Department of Transport and Main Roads in November 2012. Between 2022 and 2025, Translink absorbed the qconnect network, becoming responsible for public transport services across the majority of Queensland.

== History ==
TransInfo was a phone inquiry and timetable service established in August 1993 by Queensland Transport. It was found to be a very successful service, and in a 1997 research study 99% of surveyed transport users were either very or fairly satisfied with the service. After the success of TransInfo, in June 2003 the Queensland Government introduced Translink as an agency within Queensland Transport, replacing the former TransInfo service. With a $21.4 million budget, Translink was tasked to introduce common fares, zones and ticket types irrespective of transit mode, and from mid-2004 a smartcard system. Prior to Translink's introduction, combined patronage for public transport services was only around 112 million trips per year.

Translink delivered the new integrated ticketing system in July 2004. To help facilitate the change-over, Translink employed and deployed throughout South East Queensland 100 assistants. A daily ticket was introduced which allowed unlimited travel on all modes of public transport within the zones specified on the ticket, and for the first time students and aged pensioners throughout South East Queensland received a 50% discount on fares. In just two months an extra 2.3 million passengers travelled on transit services, and ticket sales increased by 11%. Following Translink's introduction, transit passenger numbers grew faster than ever before. In 2005, Translink saw close to a 20% increase in passenger numbers.

In February 2008, the go card was rolled out on bus, rail and ferry services in Brisbane only, as a precursor to its introduction throughout South East Queensland. The Queensland Government devolved Translink from being a division of Queensland Transport to the more autonomous Translink Transit Authority in July 2008, increasing its profile with new branding. At the same time a 24 hours a day, seven days a week customer information and support phone number was introduced.

In November 2009, Translink introduced cashless tickets during peak times, only accepting go cards and pre-purchased paper tickets in an effort to improve service efficiency. In late 2009, Translink scrapped monthly and weekly paper tickets, with plans to eliminate paper tickets by the end of 2010. On 4 January 2010, to encourage the use of the go card, off-peak discounts and a direct debit top-up option were introduced. At the same time, Translink increased fares and also announced fares would increase by a further 45% over the following three years. On 5 August 2024, Translink decreased fares to $0.50 across all zones and modes, excluding Airtrain and dedicated school buses, as a trial for 6 months. After the 2024 election, the 50 cent fares were made permanent by the new government, thus abolishing the zone system.

On 10 August 2026, Translink introduced a numbering system for all passenger railway lines in South East Queensland.

== Fares ==
Public transport fares are a 50 cent flat rate across all Translink services, regardless of how far you travel on the network or how you choose to pay (excluding Airtrain).

== Tickets ==
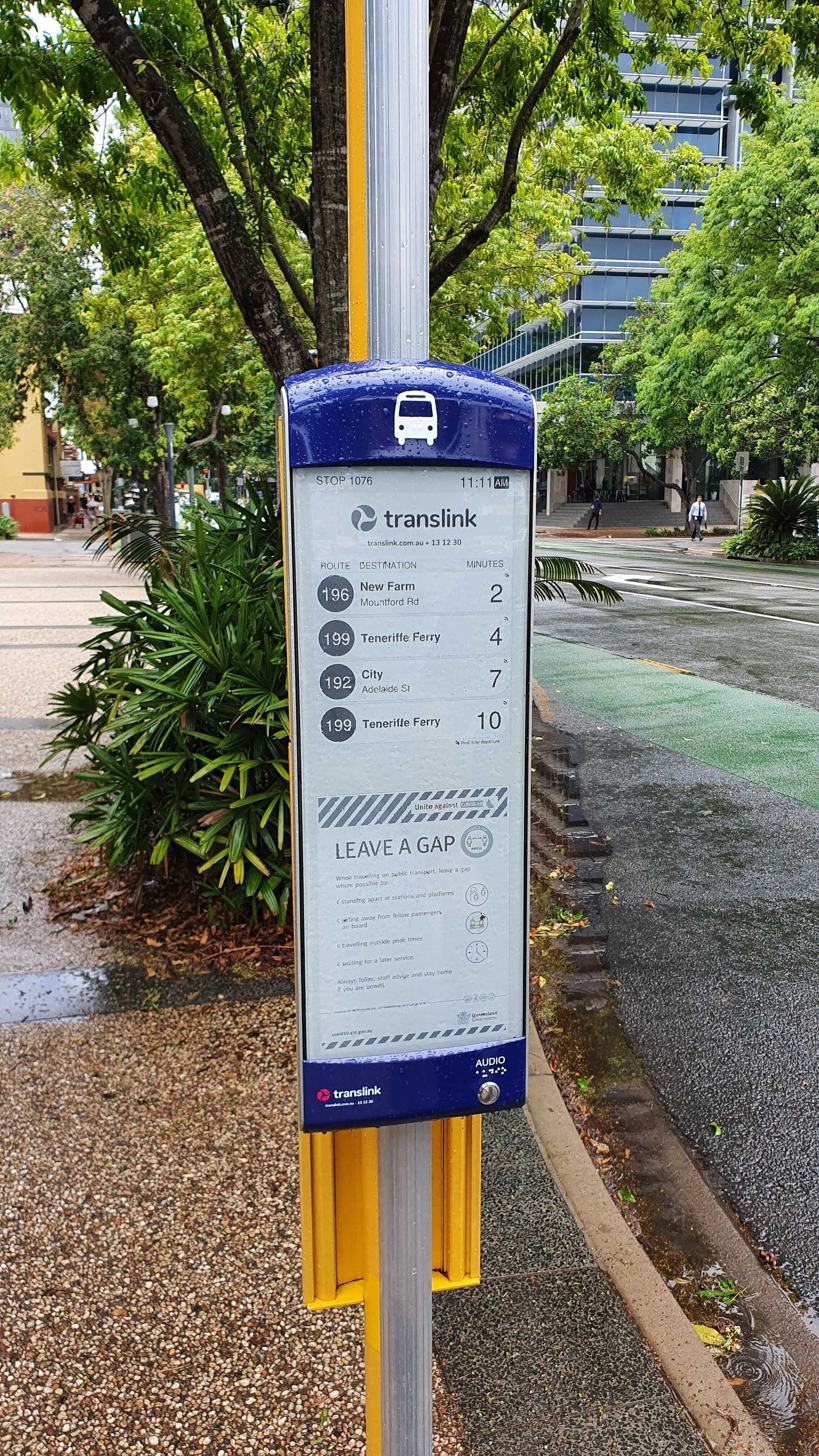
E-Ink display at a bus stop

=== Paper tickets ===
Paper tickets are available at train station ticket counters and fare machines, and busway and tram fare machines.

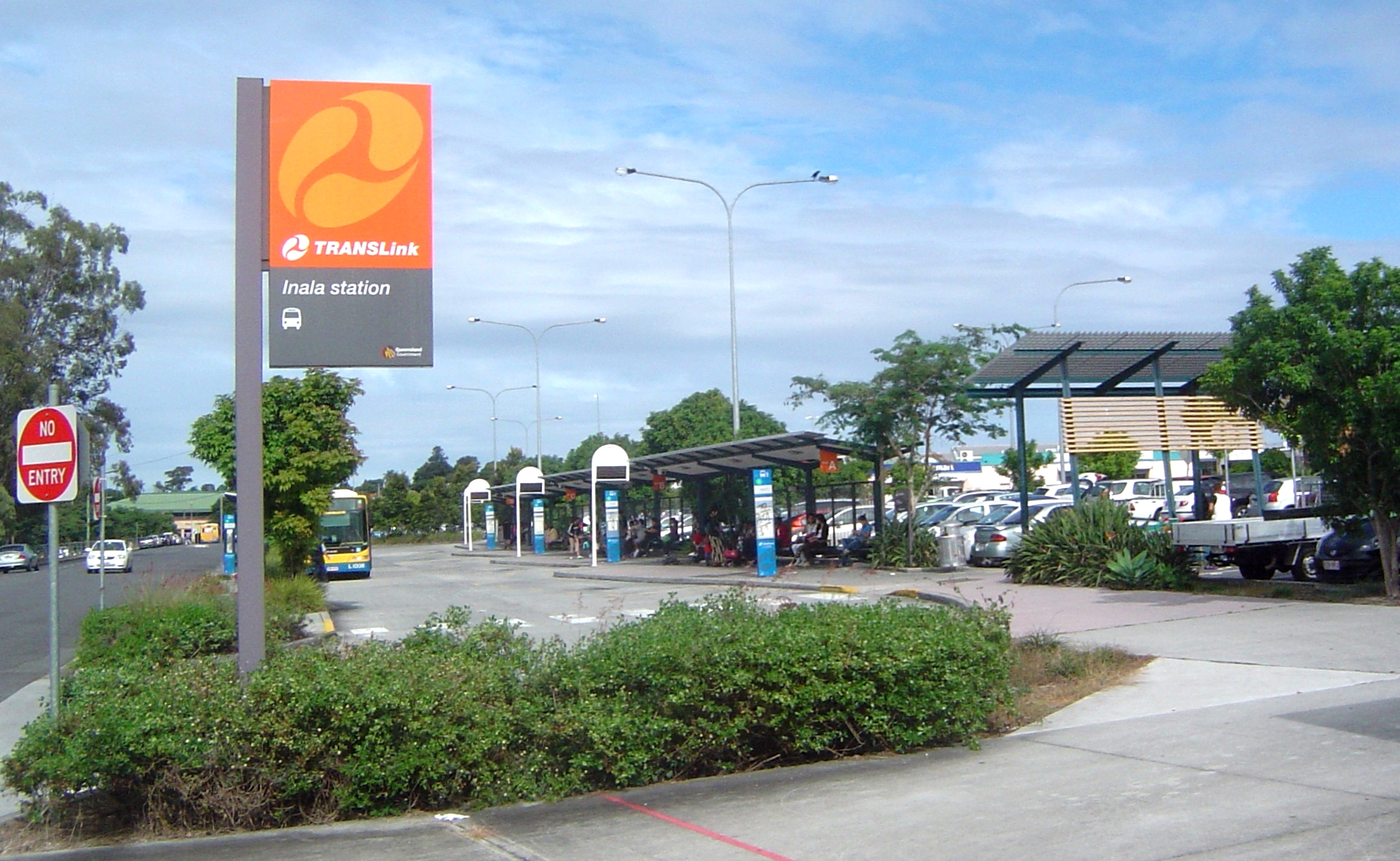
Inala bus station

=== go card ===
The go card is an electronic smartcard ticketing system. Passengers must touch the card on a card reader at the start and finish of each journey, and when transferring between services. The fare is automatically deducted from the balance associated with the card.

The following types of go card are available:

- Adult go card is for use by passengers without concessions. Tertiary students, job seekers and asylum seekers will need to have an adult go card in order to have concession fares activated on the card.
- Child go card is for use by children under the age of 15 years and provides concession fares for the holder along with free travel on weekends.
- Concession go card is for use by passengers entitled to a concession, such as secondary students, holders of a Pensioner Concession Card, and holders of a Repatriation Health Card.
- Seniors go card is for use by passengers who have a Queensland Seniors Card issued by the Queensland Government.
- Seniors+go card incorporates a Queensland Seniors Card and a go card on both sides.

A new physical and digital Translink card will replace the go card in 2026.

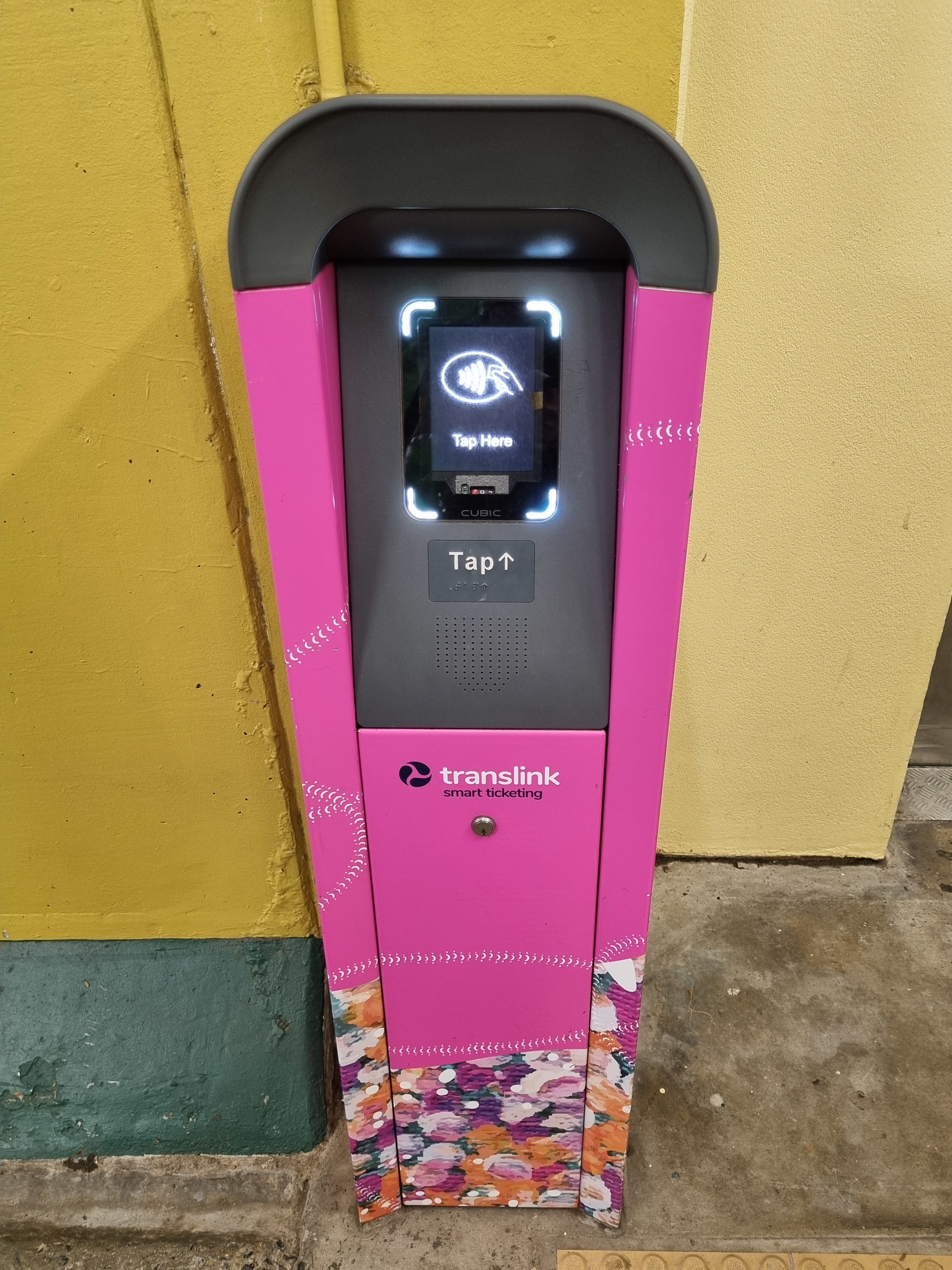
A Translink card reader

=== Contactless payments ===
Contactless payments were introduced across all modes of public transport in South East Queensland between 2020 and 2025. The system enables passengers to pay for their journey using a contactless MasterCard or Visa, including those stored in a smartphone or smartwatch. The system was successfully implemented on G:link trams in 2021, Queensland Rail trains in 2023, Brisbane City ferries in 2024, and South East Queensland buses in 2025. A new physical and digital Translink card will replace the go card in 2026.

== South East Queensland network ==
The Translink South East Queensland network is divided into 7 regions, each region typically operated by different operators. The regions are based largely on local government boundaries:

=== Greater Brisbane ===
- Airtrain Services Operator – Airtrain Citylink (non-Translink service)
- Bus Services Operator – Brisbane Bus Lines
- Bus Services Operator – Transport for Brisbane
- Ferry Services Operator – RiverCity Ferries
- Train Services Operator – Queensland Rail

=== Northern ===
- Bus Services Operator – Caboolture Bus Lines
- Bus Services Operator – Hornibrook Bus Lines
- Bus Services Operator – Kangaroo Bus Lines
- Bus Services Operator – Thompsons Bus Service

=== Southern ===
- Bus Services Operator – Park Ridge Transit
- Bus Services Operator – Clarks Logan City Bus Service
- Bus Services Operator – Kinetic Gold Coast

=== Eastern ===
- Bus Services Operator – Mt Gravatt Bus Service
- Bus Services Operator – Transdev Queensland

=== Western ===
- Bus Services Operator – Westside Bus Company
- Bus Services Operator – Bus Queensland Lockyer Valley
- Bus Services Operator – Southern Cross Transit

=== Sunshine Coast ===
- Bus Services Operator – CDC Queensland
- Bus Services Operator – Kinetic Sunshine Coast

=== Gold Coast ===
- Tram Services Operator – Keolis Downer
- Bus Services Operator – Kinetic Gold Coast

== Regional network ==
The Translink Regional network is divided into 16 regions, each region typically operated by different operators. The regions are based largely on local government boundaries:

=== Bowen ===
- Bus Services Operator – Bowen Transit

=== Bundaberg ===
- Bus Services Operator – Kinetic Bundaberg

=== Cairns ===
- Bus Services Operator – Kinetic Cairns

=== Fraser Coast ===
- Bus Services Operator – Wide Bay Transit

=== Gladstone ===
- Bus Services Operator – CDC Queensland

=== Gympie ===
- Bus Services Operator – Polleys Coaches

=== Innisfail ===
- Bus Services Operator – Trans North Bus & Coach

=== Kilcoy ===
- Bus Services Operator – Christensen's Bus and Coach

=== Mackay ===
- Bus Services Operator – Mackay Transit Coaches

=== North Stradbroke Island ===
- Bus Services Operator – Transit Systems

=== Rockhampton and Yeppoon ===
- Bus Services Operator – Young's Bus Service
- Bus Services Operator – Kinetic Rockhampton

=== Sunshine Coast Hinterland ===
- Bus Services Operator – Glasshouse Country Coaches

=== Toowoomba ===
- Bus Services Operator – Bus Queensland

=== Townsville ===
- Bus Services Operator – Kinetic Townsville

=== Warwick ===
- Bus Services Operator – Haidley's Panoramic Coaches

=== Whitsundays ===
- Bus Services Operator – Whitsunday Transit

== Services ==
=== Brisbane Metro ===
Brisbane Metro is the brand name of two high-frequency bus rapid transit routes that serve the city of Brisbane in Queensland, Australia. The system consists of two routes running through Brisbane CBD every five minutes during peak times. The 66 was renumbered M2 on 28 January 2025, whilst the 111 was renumbered M1 on 30 June 2025.

=== BUZ ===
Bus upgrade zones, commonly abbreviated to BUZ, are a feature of Brisbane's public transport system. The name is given to high-frequency bus routes operated by Transport for Brisbane, the Brisbane City Council agency that operates the city's public bus services for Translink. All BUZ services run at least every fifteen minutes from around 6:00am to 11:30pm seven days a week and at least every ten minutes during peak hours from Monday to Friday.

Nearly all BUZ routes are express services which provide quick and frequent access to places along major trunk roads, with the exception of routes 196 and 199, which are the only all-stops BUZ service with bus stops within short walking distances of each other between the inner suburbs of Fairfield, West End, New Farm and Teneriffe. Most BUZ routes are radial, and commence in or near the Brisbane CBD. However, routes 196 and 199 are again an exception, in that they are cross-town routes that passes through the CBD.

=== CityGlider ===
CityGlider is a name applied to a pair of high-frequency bus routes operated by Transport for Brisbane in Brisbane, Australia. Both are operated by dedicated fleets of buses vinyled in either blue or maroon liveries with a gliding possum motif. Bus stops serviced by the CityGlider services are identified with signs and painted kerb. Both operate 24 hours a day on Fridays and Saturdays.

=== Free Loops ===
The City Loop is a free loop service operated by Transport for Brisbane stopping at popular locations such as QUT, Alice Street, Botanic Gardens, Queen Street Mall, City Hall, Central Station, Riverside and Eagle Street Pier.

The Spring Hill Loop is a free loop service operated by Transport for Brisbane stopping at popular locations such as Post Office Square, Old Windmill Observatory, St Andrew's War Memorial Hospital, Brisbane Private Hospital and Central Station.

=== NightLink ===
NightLink is the name given to the all-night services that leave Fortitude Valley, Brisbane City and Surfers Paradise on the Gold Coast late Friday and Saturday nights.

=== On Demand ===
On Demand is a new service being tested by Translink in 6 areas across South East Queensland. Acting as a bus service designed to connect users to the wider transportation network and other key community hubs, riders are able to pre-book the service to pick them up at a collection point within a predetermined 'roam zone'. Using technology created by Via Transportation, the service is able to dynamically match users with others nearby, allowing for pickup locations to be flexibly chosen near the riders current location.

=== Rockets ===
Rockets are peak hour services operating in the direction of peak (to the city in the mornings, from the city in the evenings) with limited stops.
