= Kinetic Group =

Australian bus operator

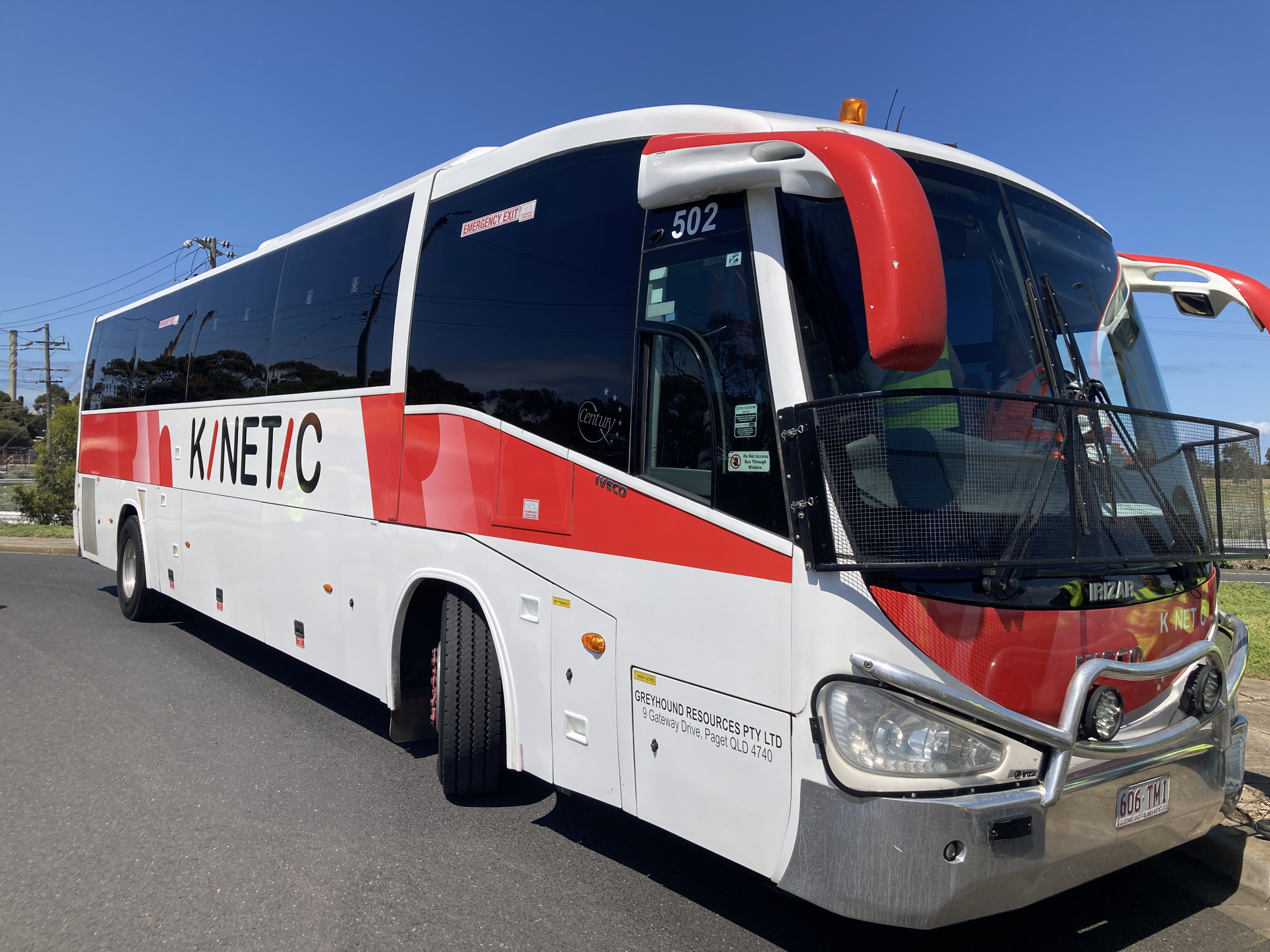
- Irizar bodied Iveco Delta in Melbourne, October 2024
- Formerly: AATS Group
- Industry: Bus transportation
- Founded: 2014
- Founder: Michael Sewards (co-CEO); Adam Begg (co-CEO)
- Headquarters: Melbourne, Australia
- Area served: Australia; Germany; New Zealand; Norway; Singapore; United Kingdom
- Parent: OPTrust (51%); Foresight Group (49%)
- Subsidiaries: See below Go-Ahead Group (51%)
- Website: wearekinetic.com

Kinetic Group (stylised as KINETIC; formerly known as AATS Group) is an Australian-based multinational bus company that wholly owns a number of bus operations in Australia and New Zealand, including the SkyBus business, which operates bus services to a number of airports in both countries. Through its 51%-owned subsidiary Go-Ahead Group based in the United Kingdom, Kinetic also operates buses and railway services in the United Kingdom, Singapore, Germany, Ireland and Norway, and the U-Go Mobility joint venture in Sydney.

Kinetic is majority owned by Canadian pension fund OPTrust and British infrastructure manager Foresight Group (who acquired Kinetic's previous co-owner Infrastructure Capital Group in 2022).

== History ==
AATS started in 2014 as a consortium that included Catalyst Direct Capital Management and OPTrust Private Markets Group to purchase SkyBus. Michael Sewards and Adam Begg were the founders and became the co-CEOs of the company.

AATS purchased Transit Australia Group (TAG) in April 2019, including bus companies Sunbus and Surfside Buslines. It was rebranded the Kinetic Group in August 2019, and remains the parent company of SkyBus and TAG. In the same month, OPTrust began to seek a co-investor in Kinetic Group, who would hold a minority share in the group.

Kinetic acquired Sydney bus and coach charter company Telfords Bus & Coach in November 2019, followed by Cairns bus operator Love's Bus Service Queensland in January 2020.

In March 2020, it was announced that Kinetic would buy GoBus with 1,700 buses, subject to approval by the New Zealand Overseas Investment Office. Approval was given in June and the acquisition was completed in August 2020.

In December 2020, Campbell's Coaches, Townsville was acquired. In February 2021, Kinetic announced it had agreed terms to purchase Greyhound Australia's resources business Greyhound Resources that provides mine transport for workers in the Bowen Basin, Hunter Valley, South Australia and Northern Territory with 170 vehicles. The deal was expected to close in April 2021. This has since been rebranded as Kinetic Resources.

In April 2021, it was announced that Redline Coaches of Tasmania would be acquired.

Following OPTrust's 2019 announcement of seeking a co-investor, Infrastructure Capital Group acquired a 49% shareholding in Kinetic in October 2021.

On 31 January 2022, Kinetic Melbourne took over the routes operated by Transdev Melbourne, with 531 buses, under a contract which runs until June 2031. In February 2022, Kinetic acquired Sainty's North East Bus Service, with vehicles and drivers joining Kinetic's Redline Coaches business.

In March 2022, Kinetic announced its acquisition of NZ Bus, which operates in Auckland, Tauranga and Wellington and is one of New Zealand's biggest urban bus operators, with 800 buses and 14 depots. In the same month, Kinetic also announced the acquisition of Mersey Bus & Coach Services (Merseylink), the largest private operator in Tasmania which operates 51 general and school bus services in Devonport and north-west Tasmania. In June 2022, in partnership with Globalvia, Kinetic's offer to purchase the Go-Ahead Group was recommended for acceptance by its board. The sale was approved by Go-Ahead's shareholders in August 2022. Kinetic has a 51% shareholding.

In November 2022, Kinetic began operating a new depot at High Wycombe in Perth, Western Australia, offering school route and charter services, general charter and event services.

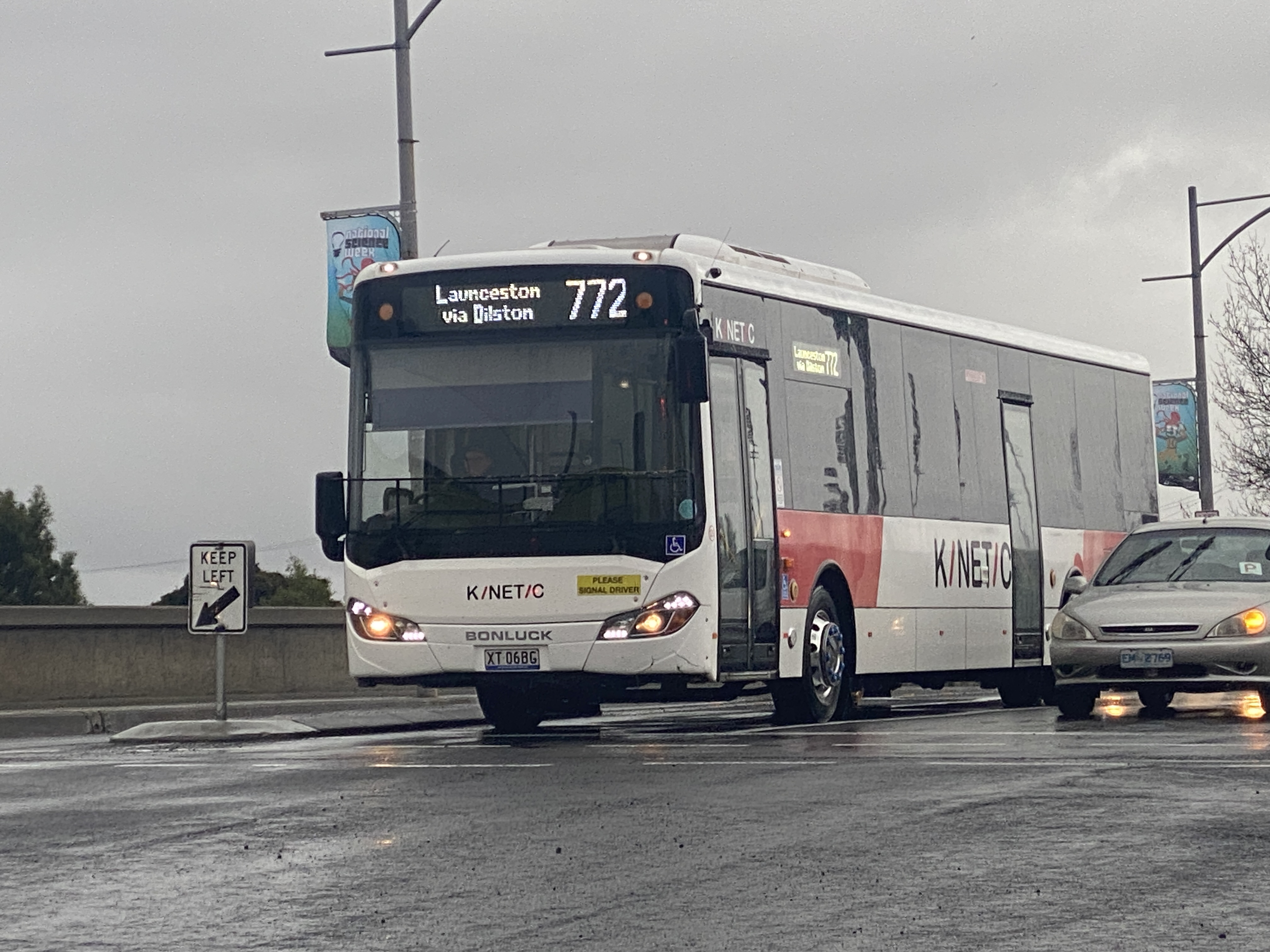
Kinetic bus service in Launceston, Tasmania

In late 2022, four of Kinetic's subsidiaries, Sunbus (including Love's Bus Service Queensland), Surfside Buslines, Telfords Bus & Coach and Redline Coaches, were rebranded to Kinetic.

In December 2024, Kinetic wound up it Telfords Bus & Coach operation. Kinetic continued to operate buses in Sydney through its shareholding in U-Go Mobility.

In November 2025 terms were agreed for TPG to purchased a 70% shareholding with OPTrust to sell its shareholding and Foresight Group to reduce its shareholding to 30%. The transaction is subject to regulatory approval.

In October 2026 Kinetic took acquisition of Dyson group a family owned and operated business for 74 years. Dysons had depots in Bundoora, Reservoir, Deniliquin, Hay, Finley, Shepparton, Kyneton, Moama, Wangaratta, Wodonga, Sale and Bairnsdale along with numerous other small depots. All now running under the Kinetic banner

== Operations ==
Below is Kinetic's current and former bus companies that it operates:

=== Australia ===
Kinetic has an extensive presence in Australia operating in almost every state and territory from commuter services to charter and coach services.

==== Northern Territory ====
- Greyhound Resources. Following the acquisition and re-brand of Greyhound Resources, Kinetic provides bus services for the mining and resources sector.

==== Queensland ====
With the rebranding of several former subsidiaries in 2022, Kinetic operates an extensive commuter transport service throughout the state in the following regions:

- Bundaberg (formerly Duffy's City Buses)
- Kinetic Cairns (formerly Love's Bus Service and Sunbus Cairns)
- Kinetic Gold Coast (formerly Surfside Buslines)
- Mackay Transit Coaches
- Kinetic Rockhampton (formerly Sunbus Rockhampton)
- Kinetic Sunshine Coast (formerly Sunbus Sunshine Coast)
- Kinetic Townsville (formerly Sunbus Townsville)

==== New South Wales ====
- Tweed Coast (commuter service)
- U-Go Mobility (commuter service in Sydney, via its subsidiary Go-Ahead Group)

==== Victoria ====
- Melbourne (commuter service under the brand name Kinetic Melbourne)
- Skybus (Melbourne Tullamarine and Avalon airport transfers)

==== Tasmania ====
- Hobart (formerly Redline Coaches)
- Skybus (Hobart Airport transfers)
- Launceston (formerly Redline Coaches)
- Devonport (formerly Merseylink)
- North West (formerly O'Driscolls Coaches)
- School and charter service throughout the state

==== Western Australia ====
- Kinetic Resources (Kinetic provides bus services for the mining and resources sector)
- Coach and school service

=== New Zealand ===
- NZBus (commuter services in Auckland, Tauranga and Wellington)
- Go Bus (commuter and transport services in Hamilton, Hawke's Bay, Tauranga, Christchurch, Gisborne, Dunedin and Invercargill.)
- Johnston's (tour and charter service)

=== Other countries ===
Through its 51% shareholding in Go-Ahead Group, Kinetic also operates buses in the United Kingdom, Singapore and Ireland, and railway services in the United Kingdom, Norway and Germany.

=== Former operations ===
New South Wales

- Telfords Bus & Coach – ceased in 2024
