= BusTech =

Australian bus-building manufacturer

BusTech Group

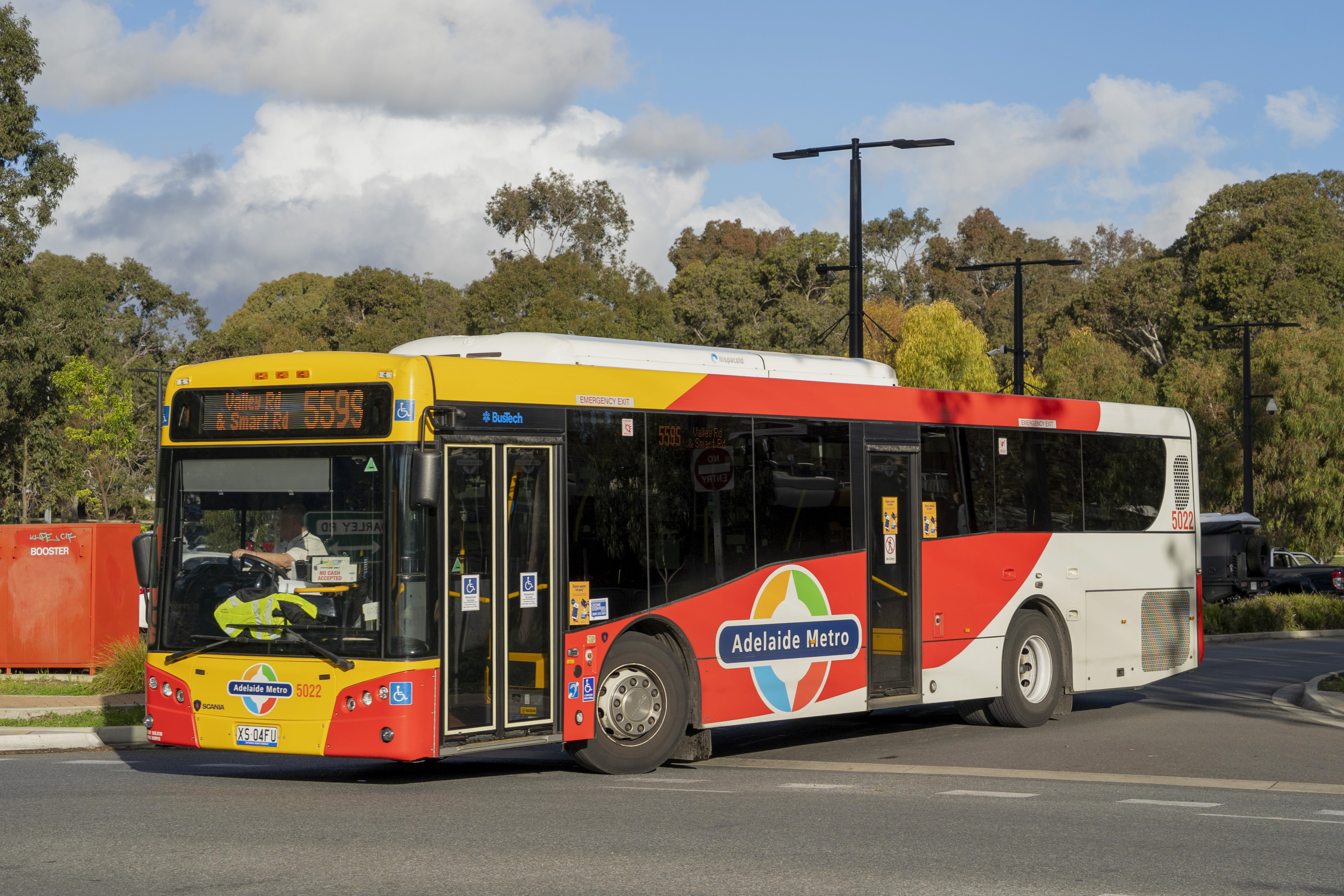
- An Adelaide Metro K320UB with BusTech VST bodywork at Paradise Interchange in September 2025
- Industry: Bus manufacturing
- Founded: 1995; 31 years ago
- Founder: Tony and Joe Calabro
- Headquarters: Rocklea, Queensland Edinburgh, South Australia, Australia
- Key people: Christian Reynolds, Director and Chairman Mathew Fitch, Director Dan Marks, Director
- Owner: GoZero Group
- Website: bustechgroup.com.au

BusTech Group is an Australian bus-building manufacturer with production facilities in Rocklea, Queensland and Edinburgh, South Australia. BusTech Group produces fully built up integral route buses, school buses and double deck buses and also produces single deck bus bodies, largely built on European chassis from manufacturers such as Mercedes-Benz, Volvo and Scania, predominantly under their VST model line. As of 2022, BusTech Group was actively delivering new buses into Queensland, South Australia, Victoria, New South Wales, Tasmania and the ACT.

The company was originally established as Bustech in 1995 by the then owners of Gold Coast, Queensland bus operator, Surfside Buslines the Calabro family. Early production generally focused on producing low entry, route bus bodies with smaller numbers of school buses and charter/touring vehicles were also produced.

Bustech produced its first integral bus in 2007, a midi-sized route bus with production subsequently expanding into full size route and school buses by 2008. An urban double deck bus began production in 2011 and Australia's first locally engineered and built electric bus was completed by Bustech in 2015.

Bustech formed part of the Transit Australia Group from 2008 under Calabro family ownership, until the latter was dissolved in 2019 upon the sale of bus operations to AATS Group.

Bustech formed a joint venture agreement with Precision Components, owned by Fusion Capital and began producing buses under the Precision Buses name in 2017. In addition, Elphinstone Group in Tasmania began assembling buses under agreement in 2017. Bustech and Precision Buses formalised a merger in 2019, with management of the two operations initially known as the Australian Bus Corporation. The company was rebranded and relaunched as BusTech Group in December 2020.

In February 2021 it was announced that a factory is being planned near Newcastle, New South Wales to build electric buses for New South Wales operators.

BusTech Group entered administration on 12 August 2024. In September 2024, it was announced that GoZero Group had agreed terms to purchase BusTech, with the transaction completed on 1 July 2025.

== History ==
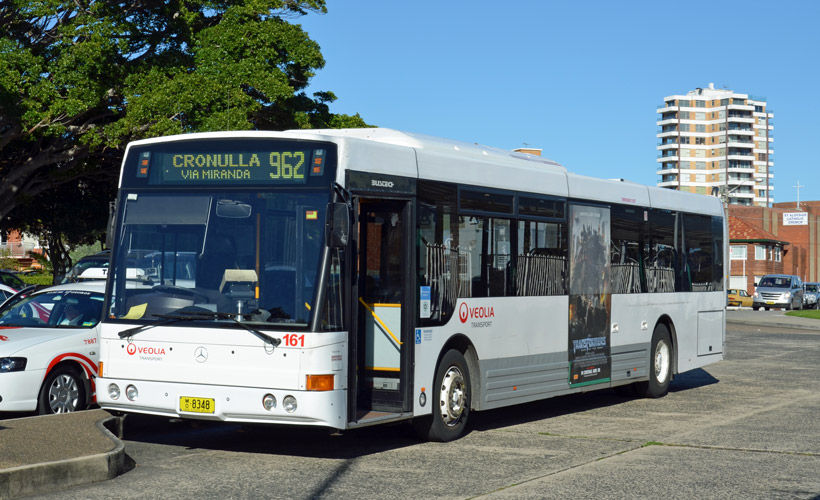
Bustech bodied Mercedes-Benz O405NH of 2002 new to Connex NSW

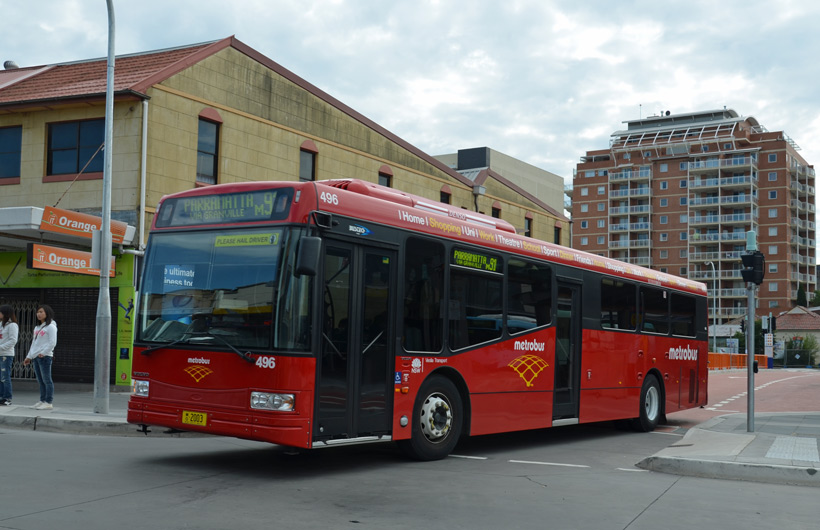
Bustech VST body of 2010 built on a Volvo B7RLE chassis

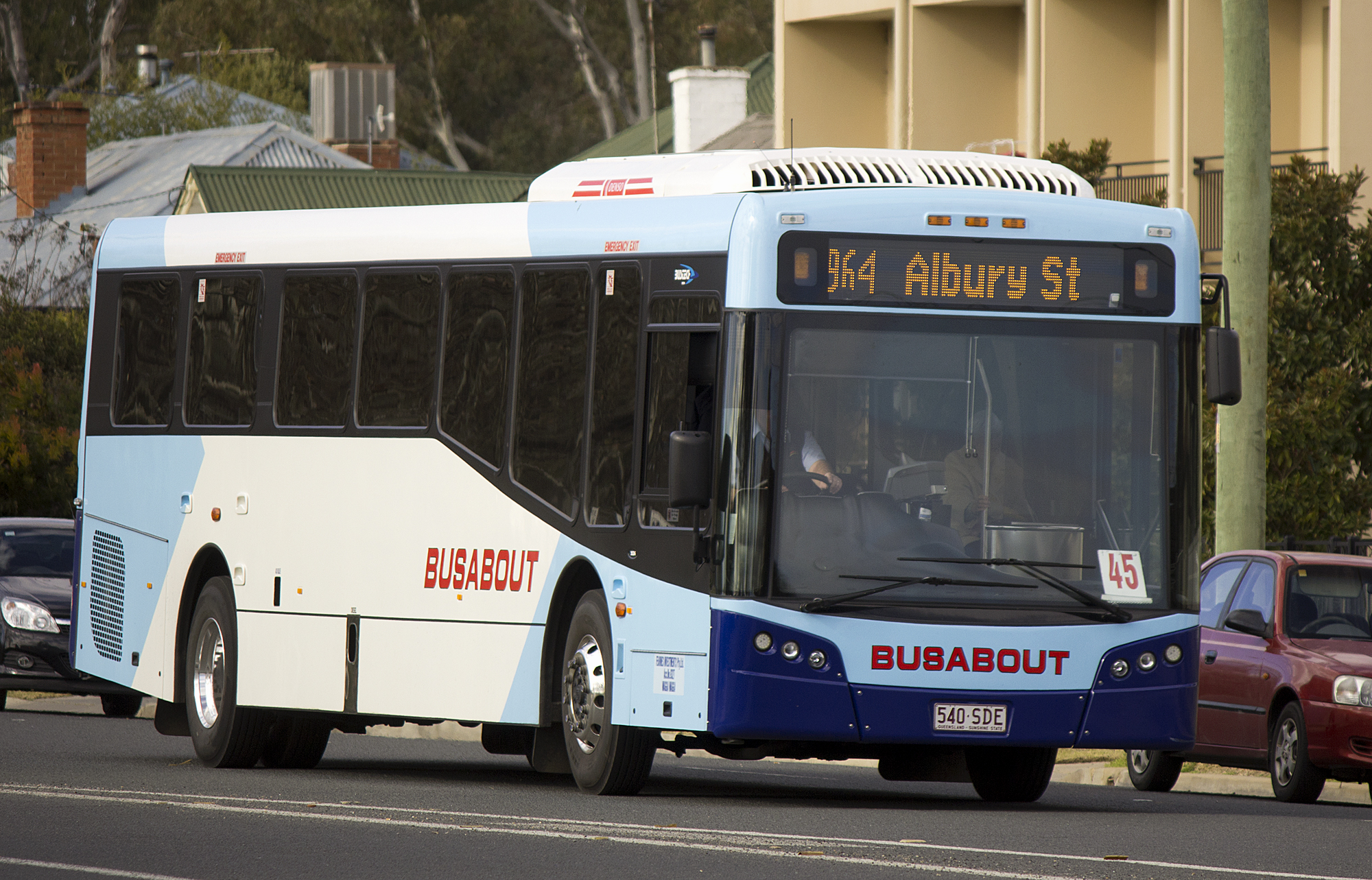
Bustech XDi of 2012 with Cummins ISL engine operating on demonstration with Busabout

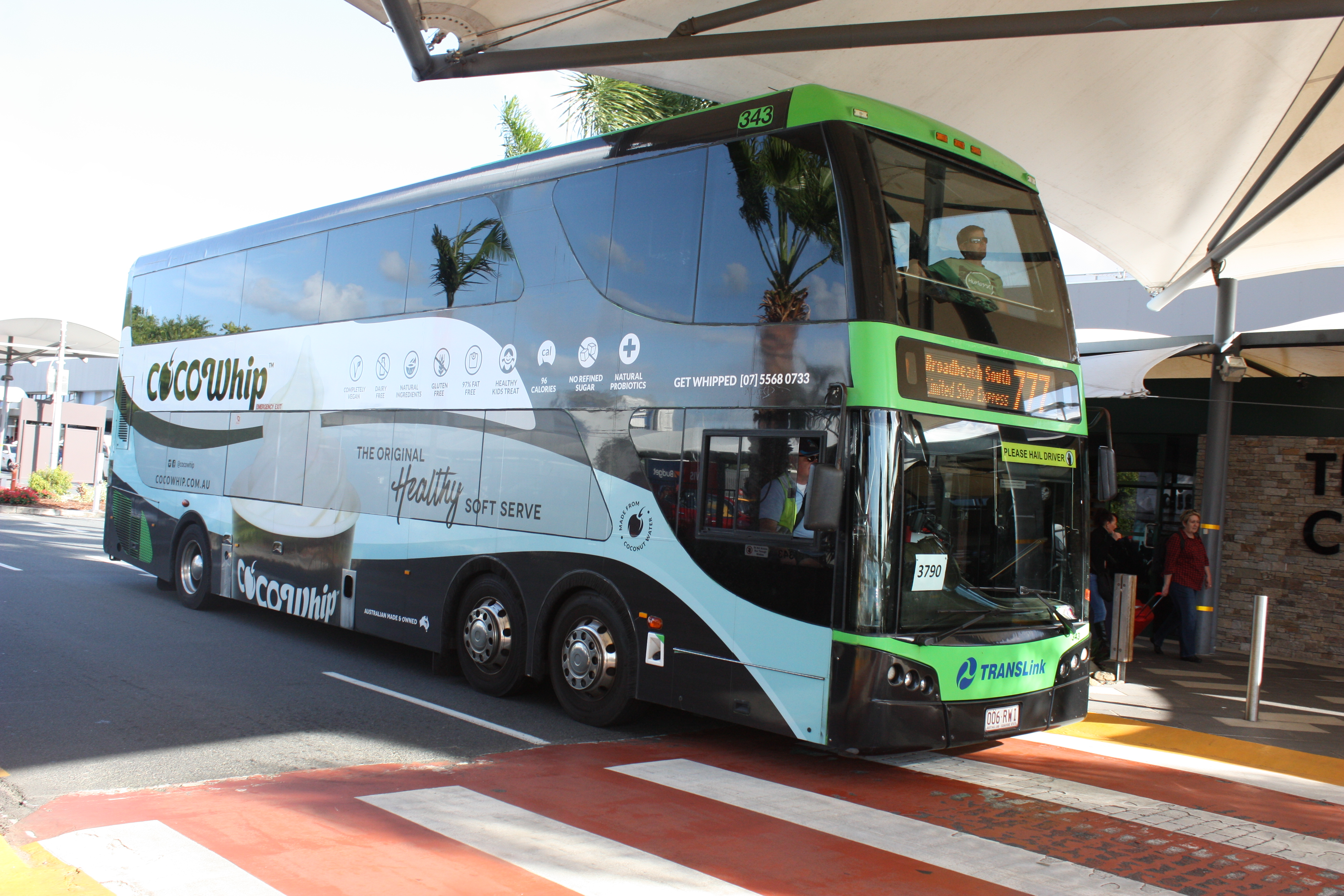
Bustech CDi of 2013 with Cummins ISL engine operating a 777 inbound at Gold Coast Airport

=== Calabro family ownership ===
Bustech was founded by the proprietors of Surfside Buslines, Joe and Tony Calabro, on the Gold Coast in 1995. Buses were initially produced on Mercedes-Benz, Volvo and Hino chassis with the first such vehicle completed in 1998 from their original Ernest, Queensland factory. In late 2003, Bustech began production of the VST model. In October 2004 Bustech moved to a new factory in Calabro Way, West Burleigh.

Bustech became part of the Transit Australia Group in 2008 as part of a restructuring of the Calabro operations. In the same year, the company launched its first integral bus the 10.5 metre MDi. This was followed by the 12.5 metre XDi, SDi school bus and in July 2011 by the 12.5 metre CDi double decker, the first double deck citybus built for Australian operation since 1973. In November 2009, Bustech completed its 1000th bus.

In July 2015, in collaboration with Swinburne University of Technology, the Automotive Cooperative Research Centre (AutoCRC) and the Malaysian Automotive Institute, Bustech unveiled its first electric bus to be designed, engineered and manufactured in Australia, known as the ZDi. Bustech has already signed a AUD$170 million contract to manufacture electric buses for the Malaysian government in late 2014. with the first electric prototype bus delivered to Malaysia in 2016 branded as the XDi-E. In 2016, through the Transit Australia Group, Bustech signed a deal with Dubai South to provide electric buses. One ZDi bus was exported to Dubai for evaluation in 2017.

=== Fusion Capital Holdings ownership ===
Bustech was not included in the April 2019 purchase of the Transit Australia Group by the AATS Group (now Kinetic Group). In September 2019, it was announced that Bustech will be merging with its joint venture partner Precision Buses, which is owned by Fusion Capital Holdings. Both organisations would have a combined strategic management and direction under a new holding company called Australian Bus Corporation, a wholly owned subsidiary of Fusion. However, each of them would retain their own brand identities and continue to operate in their own capacity at their respective facilities.

In June 2020, Bustech formed a partnership with Ebusco to produce the zero emission Ebusco 2.2 model and the next generation, carbon based Ebusco 3.0 model in Australia in a purpose built high tech facility.

In August 2020, Bustech and Proterra announced a new collaboration to manufacture the all-electric ZDi 12.5m city bus utilizing Proterra’s battery technology platform.

In December 2020 Bustech was rebranded as the BusTech Group.

In late 2023, production was moved from Burleigh Heads, to Rocklea in Brisbane.

=== GoZero Group ownership ===
On 12 August 2024, BusTech was placed into administration. In September 2024, both BusTech companies were contracted to be acquired by the GoZero Group. The sale was finalised in July 2025.

On 22 October 2025, BusTech re-located the Adelaide from Edinburgh to Green Fields.

== Products ==
=== Early bus bodies ===
Most of the early buses from 1998 to 2003 were built for the Calabro's operations Surfside Buslines and other operators such as Clark's Logan City Bus Service and Whitsunday Transit in Queensland and Buslines Group, Oliveri's Metro-Link and King Brothers in New South Wales. Following the collapse of the Clifford Corporation, Bustech was successful in winning further orders from a variety of operators such as Sunbus and the Pulitano Group in Queensland and Connex, Forest Coachlines and Calabro family relation Busabout in New South Wales from 2000 to 2002. The in-house name for the early body names were "ULF" for low floor units, such as the B12BLE, O405NH and L94UB units built, whereas the high floor units were named "UHF" for models such as the RG230 and O400.

=== VST ===
The VST model commenced production in 2003 on a variety of chassis with more than 1,500 vehicles produced. It is a low-floor city's body, available in single and dual door configurations. Various seating options are also available. The naming of VST means "Versatile".

Body	Length	Chassis	Operators
VST	11.7m (K320UB/K320CB) 12.5m	MAN (18.310, 19.320); Mercedes-Benz (0500LE); Scania K Series (K280UB, K310UB, K320UB, K360UA, K320CB); Volvo (B12BLE, B7RLE, B8RLE)	11.7m - Adelaide Metro, Torrens Transit, Busways, SouthLink, Transit Systems NSW,U-Go Mobility, CDC NSW
VST-A (Articulated)	18m	Scania K360UA	Adelaide Metro (Torrens Transit, Busways, SouthLink)
VSTM	11m	Scania K280UB	Transdev John Holland (prev. State Transit Authority)
VSTC	13m	MAN	Skybus NZ
VSTH	12.5m	Volvo Hybrid	

=== SBM/SBV ===
The SBM/SBV is a 12.5m school/charter bus body with a single door and the option for underfloor luggage bins. Commenced production in 2006 branded as the Graduate, they have been built on a variety of chassis including MAN 18.280 and 19.320, Mercedes-Benz OH1830L, Scania K94IB, and Volvo B7R/Volvo B8R. The naming SBM stands for School Bus MAN/Mercedes-Benz whilst SBV stands for School Bus Volvo

=== Diesel Integral Buses ===
Body	Type	Length	Seats	Engine	Transmission	Produced From	Notes
MDi	Low-floor City Midi	10.5m	43	Caterpillar C7 (Original), Cummins ISB/ISL	ZF	2007	
XDi	Low-floor City Bus	12.5m	55 (51 w/ Center Door)	Caterpillar C7 (Original), Cummins ISC/ISB/ISL	ZF	2008	A single XDi-E (12.5m low-floor electric city bus integral) was produced in 2015 for export to Malaysia
CDi	Low-floor Double Deck	12.5m	96	Cummins ISL 9-litre	Allison, ZF	2011	Twin Door, Dual Front Steer
ADi	Low-floor Tour Bus	12.5m	53	Cummins ISL 9-litre	Allison, ZF	2012	Underfloor Luggage Bins
SDi	School Bus	12.5m	61	Cummins ISL 9-litre	Allison, ZF	2012	Underfloor Luggage Bins

=== ZDi (Electric Integral Bus) ===
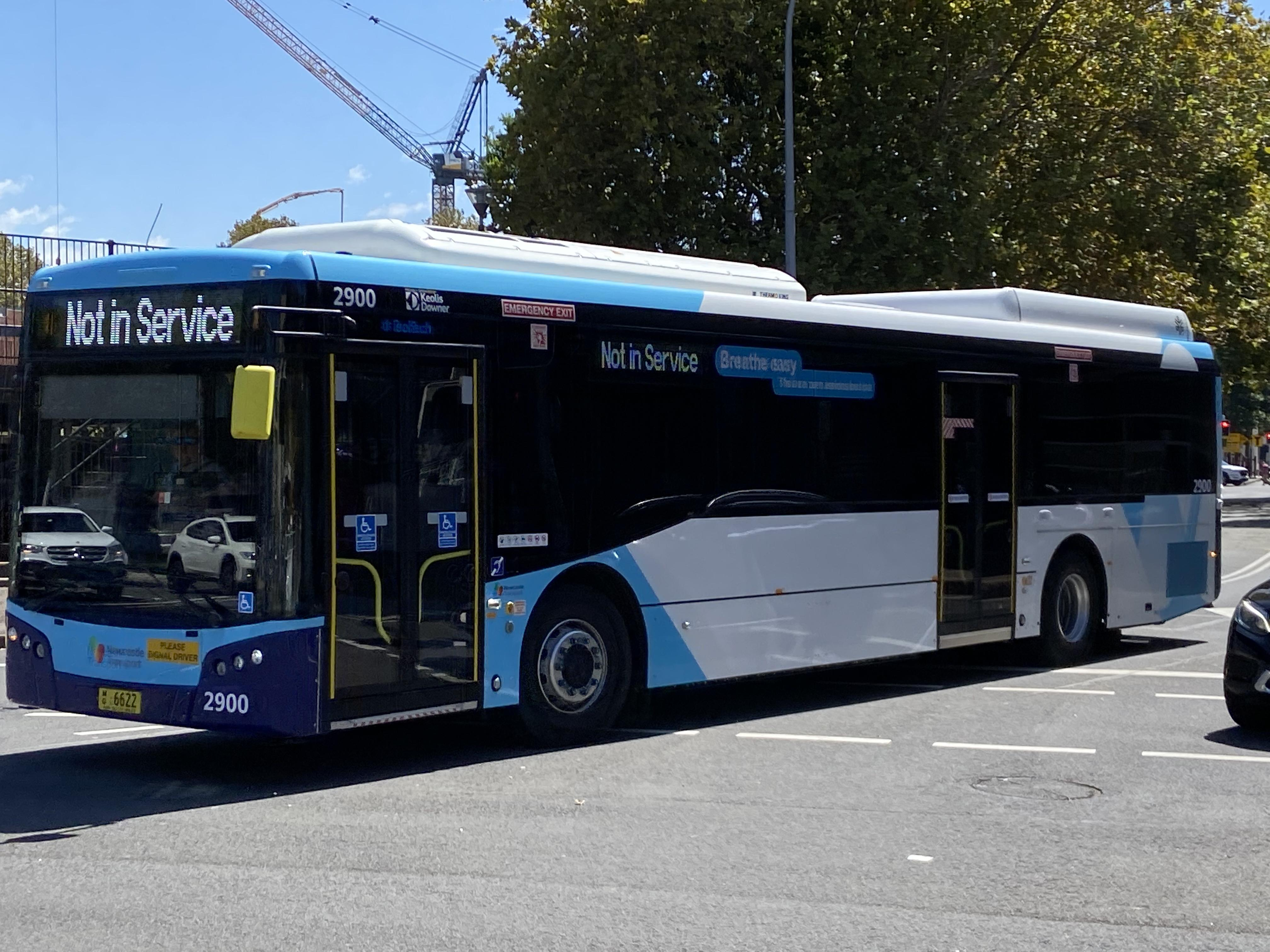
Bustech ZDI Electric bus with Newcastle Transport in Newcastle, 2023

The ZDi is a 12.5m, 41-seater low-floor integral city bus, with full electric propulsion. The models produced between 2015 and 2022 were produced with ZF axles and Toshiba batteries. Three ZDi evaluation and test buses have been produced, with one exported for trialed in Dubai, and the remaining two built for operation in Adelaide, however remaining under test as at 2021. Only one of the Adelaide buses saw service, with the other never leaving the factory site.

In 2023, Hunter Valley based transit operator Newcastle Transport begun using 3 Bustech ZDi's as part of the New South Wales governments move to a fully zero emissions bus fleet by 2047

The ZDi model has been approved as a "Panel 3-approved Australian vehicle for NSW" by Transport for NSW."
