= SkyBus (airport bus) =

Australian airport bus service

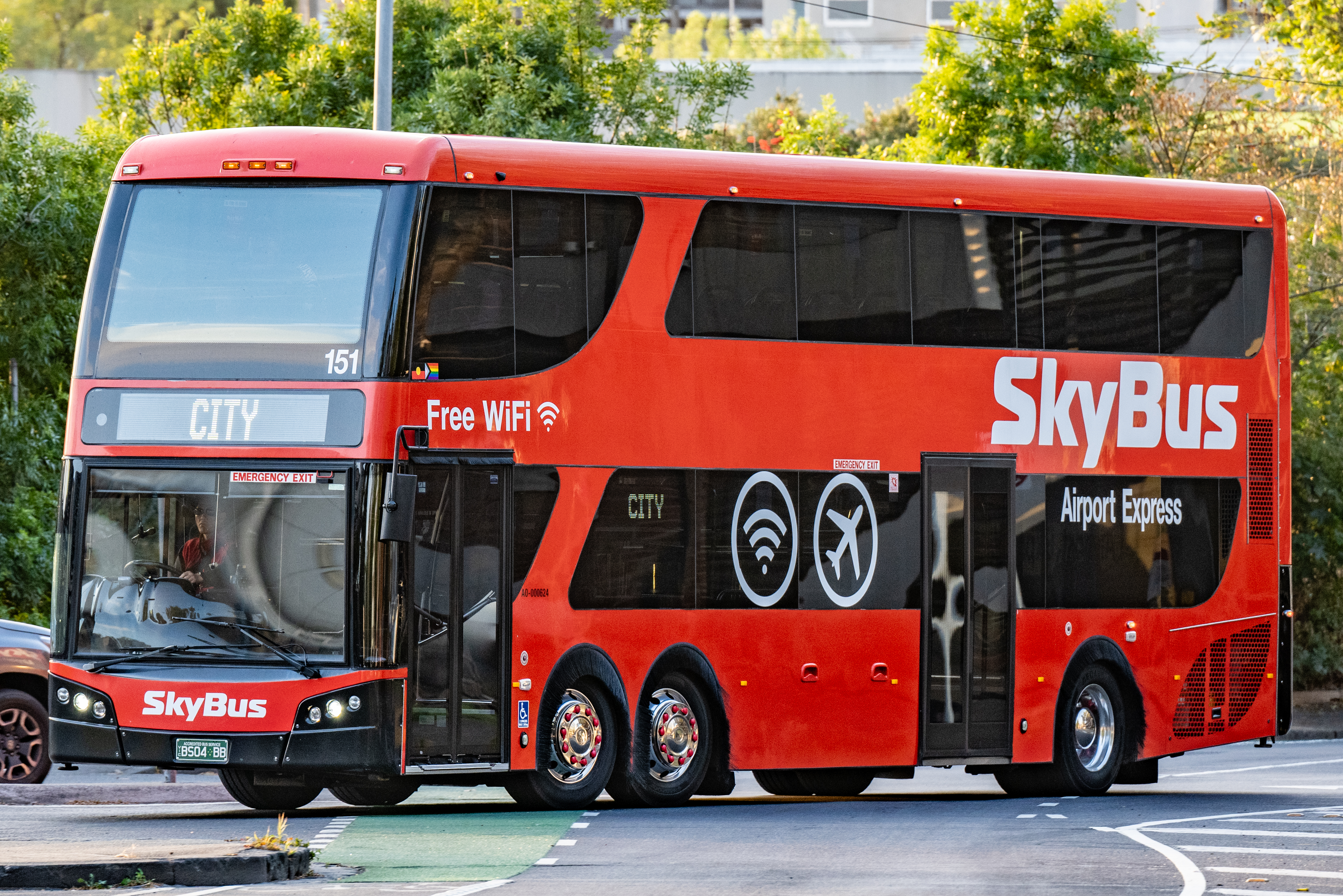
- Bustech CDi in September 2023
- Parent: Kinetic Group (majority owned by OPTrust)
- Founded: June 1978
- Headquarters: Melbourne Airport
- Service area: Melbourne; Hobart; Launceston
- Service type: Airport bus
- Hubs: Avalon Airport; Melbourne Airport; Hobart Airport; Launceston Airport; Sydney Airport (internal only); Perth Airport (internal only)
- Fleet: 104 (June 2022)
- Chief executive: Michael Sewards
- Website: www.skybus.com.au www.skybus.co.nz

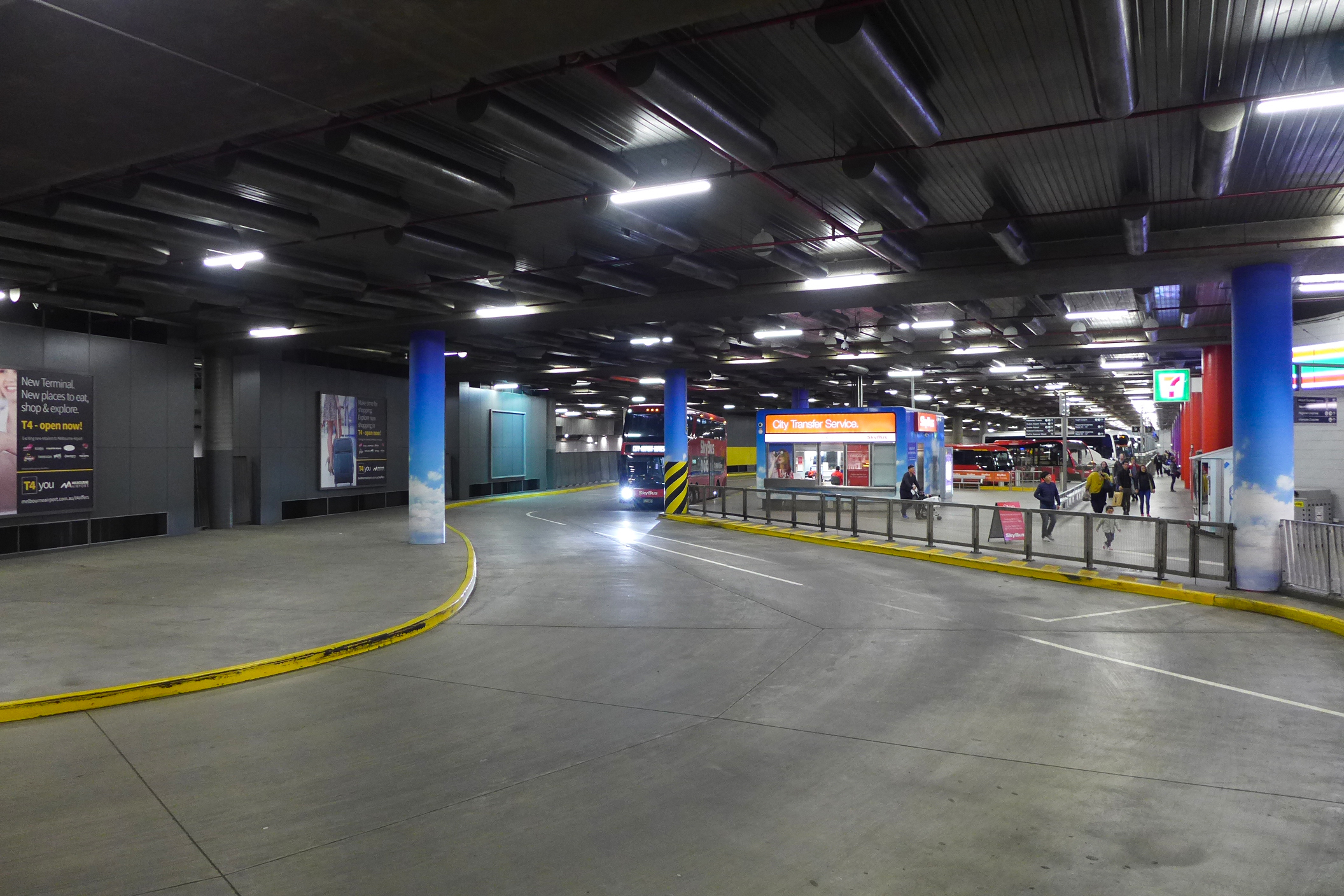
SkyBus Terminal near Southern Cross station

SkyBus is an airport bus service operating in Australia in Melbourne, Hobart and Launceston.

In Melbourne, SkyBus carries over 2 million passengers per year and 8.3% of all Melbourne Airport passengers.

== History ==
SkyBus commenced operations on 6 June 1978, running a shuttle service between Melbourne Airport and the Melbourne city centre. On 2 August 1982, SkyBus took over the airport bus services run by the now-defunct airlines Ansett and TAA.

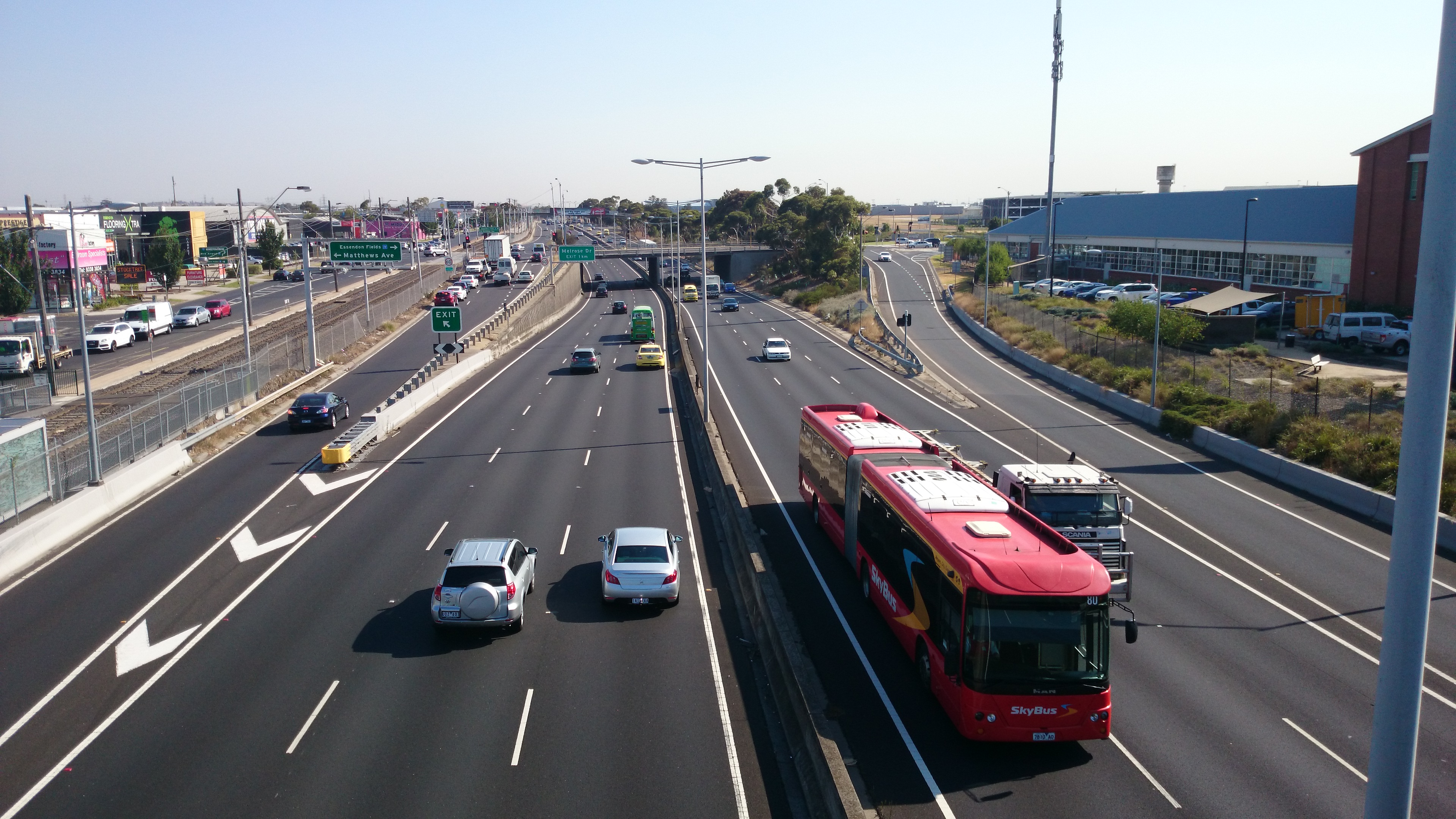
A red Skybus bus on the Tullamarine Freeway

Until November 2000, the Melbourne city centre terminus was at a coach depot in Franklin Street. It would pick up passengers at the then Spencer Street station and various city hotels before continuing on to the airport. In November 2000, SkyBus relocated to Spencer Street station with services operating express to the airport, cutting the journey time to 20 minutes and allowing more services to be introduced. Connecting minibuses were introduced to continue the hotel transfer/pickup service.

In 2002, the Government of Victoria opted to contribute $3 million to a $10 million plan to expand and improve SkyBus services, after a feasibility study into a city to airport rail link found the service would not be viable. The initiative funded the purchase of new buses, and improvements to the Tullamarine Freeway, to give SkyBus vehicles priority in traffic. The operation has an audited revenue share arrangement with the Victorian Government.

In August 2008, the SkyBus contract was renewed for five years. In 2007 SkyBus' patronage grew by 17% over the previous year, to 1.6 million passengers, with estimated revenue of $24 million.

Proposals to improve the bus service involving turning emergency lanes into bus lanes on the freeway and the Bolte Bridge and putting SkyBus on a Myki fare, were challenged by CityLink operator Transurban, because it would limit its toll revenue, and by Melbourne Airport, because it would reduce its car parking profits. Both facilities were privatised in the 1990s.

In September 2014, SkyBus was purchased by a consortium that included Catalyst Direct Capital Management and OPTrust Private Markets Group. The consortium would later be known as AATS Group (known as Kinetic Group since August 2019). In 2015, SkyBus purchased the Auckland Airport service in New Zealand from Johnston's Coachlines. In June 2016, SkyBus commenced operating to Frankston with the purchase of the Frankston & Peninsula Airport Shuttle.

In February 2017, SkyBus took over the route between Southern Cross station and Avalon Airport previously run by Sita Buslines. In July 2017, it began operating the Geelong to Avalon Airport service after the previous owners, Murrel Group, lost their accreditation to enter the airport. In November 2017, SkyBus Gold Coast operations commenced in Gold Coast, Queensland with the purchase of the Gold Coast Tourist Shuttle (GCTS) business from Surfside Buslines.

== Current services ==
=== Avalon Airport ===
==== Avalon City Express ====
The Avalon City Express service operates between Avalon Airport and Southern Cross railway station via the Princes Freeway and West Gate Freeway, making a stop in Werribee. The service operates to a timetable that is adjusted monthly, with one service connecting to every flight departing and arriving at Avalon Airport.

=== Hobart Airport ===
==== Hobart Express ====
In July 2018, SkyBus commenced services between the Hobart central business district and Hobart Airport.

=== Launceston Airport ===
==== Launceston Express ====
In November 2026, SkyBus commenced service between Launceston central business district and Launceston Airport.

=== Melbourne Airport ===
==== Melbourne City Express ====
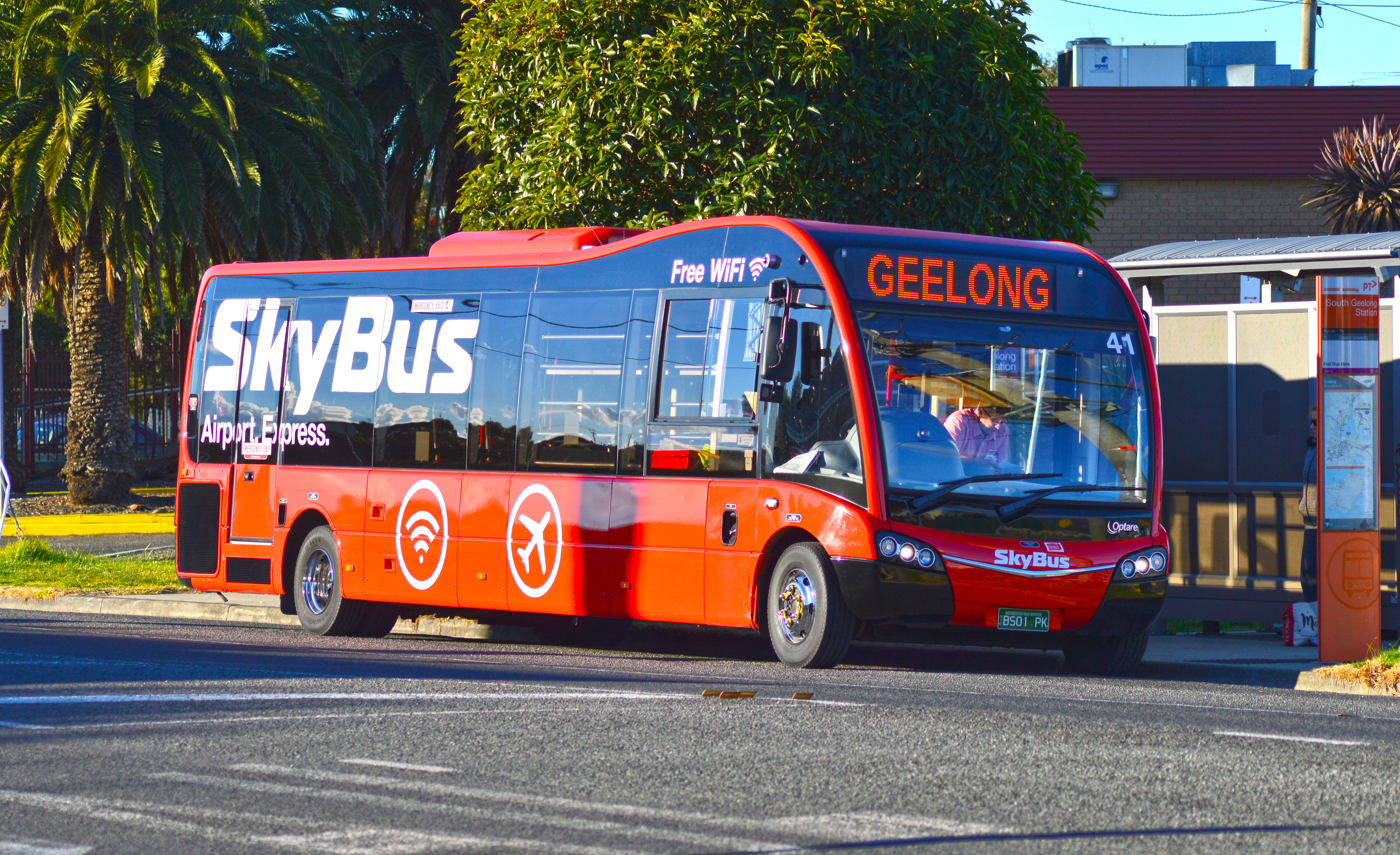
Optare Solo with Skybus Airport Express livery

The Melbourne City Express is SkyBus's flagship service. It operates between Melbourne Airport in Tullamarine and Southern Cross railway station on the western edge of the Melbourne city centre, via the Tullamarine Freeway and CityLink, with no intermediate stops. At Melbourne Airport, SkyBus stops for pick up and drop off at Terminals 1 and 3, and also picks up at Terminal 4. Terminals 2 and 4 are within walking distance from the Terminal 3 stop.

The service operates 24 hours a day, 365 days a year, to a 10-minute frequency between 6:00 am and 12:00 am (midnight), subject to traffic conditions. The service operates to a 30-minute frequency between 1:00 am and 4:30 am, and 15 to 30 minutes at all other times.

SkyBus is not covered under the Myki ticketing system which services the rest of Melbourne. However, SkyBus allows the use of the access travel pass on all SkyBus services in Victoria only. Proposals in January 2013 by the Victorian Government to integrate SkyBus ticketing with the Myki system were shelved after opposition from Transurban and Melbourne Airport.

==== Peninsula Express ====
The Peninsula Express is a shuttle that operates between Terminal 1 and 4 of Melbourne Airport and Frankston railway station. It makes intermediate stops at St Kilda, Elwood, Elsternwick, Brighton, North Brighton railway station, Moorabbin, Westfield Southland, Parkdale, Mentone and Chelsea.

==== Eastern Express ====
The Eastern Express operates between Terminals 1 and 4 of Melbourne Airport and Box Hill Central. It makes intermediate stops at Watsonia railway station and Westfield Doncaster.

While the service originally extended to Croydon railway station, with additional stops at Blackburn railway station and Ringwood railway station, this service was suspended during the COVID-19 pandemic. The service recommenced on 31 August, 2025.

==== Sunshine Express ====
The Sunshine Express began operations on the 9th of November 2025. The service runs express between Sunshine Station in central Sunshine and Melbourne Airport. V/Line train passengers along the Geelong and Ballarat train lines are able to change to a SkyBus at Sunshine instead of having to travel the extra 12 kilometres (7.5 mi) to catch the SkyBus in the Melbourne CBD.

== Discontinued services ==
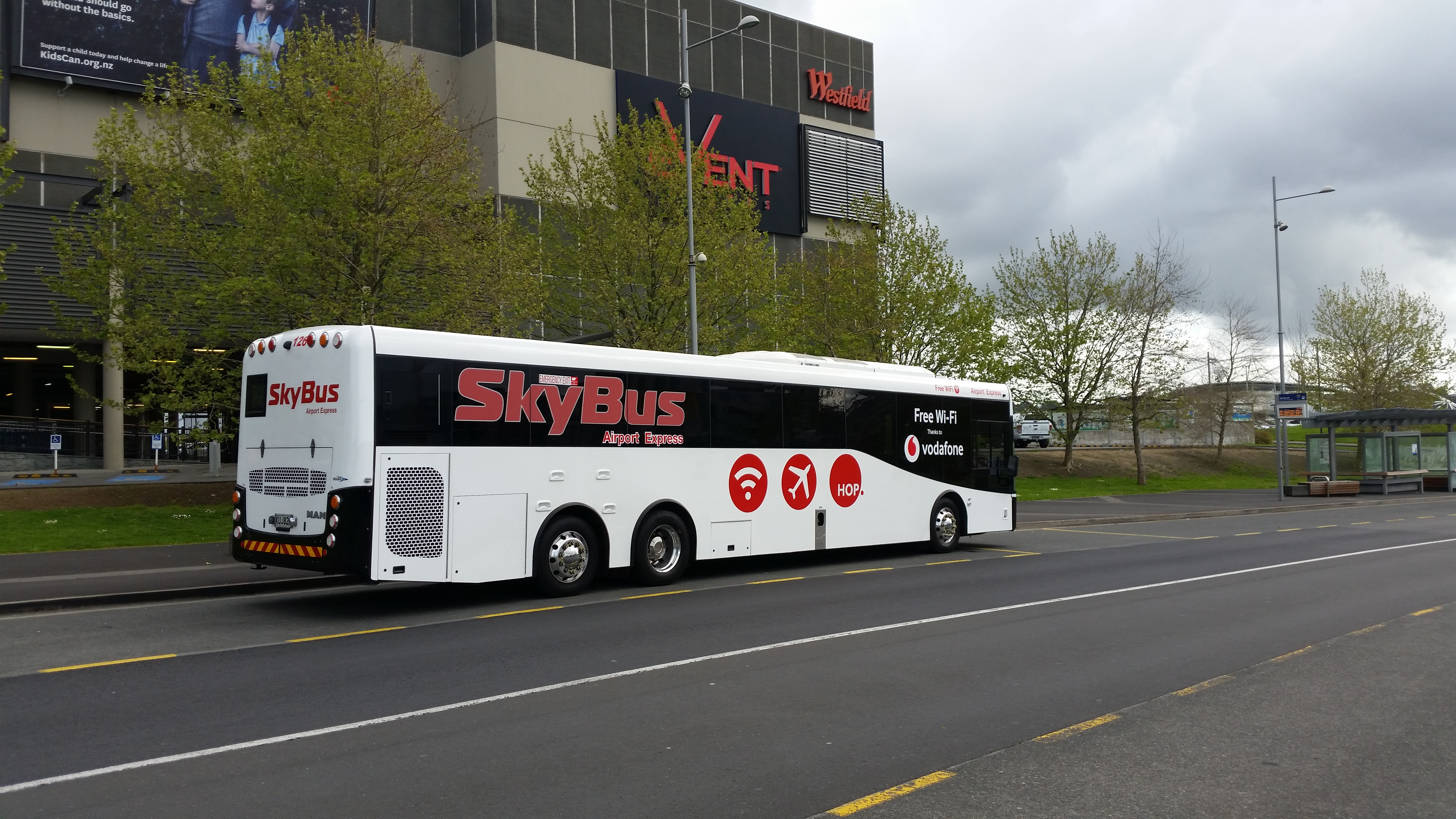
A SkyBus bus at its North Harbour terminus at the Westfield Albany mall

=== Australia ===
==== Avalon Airport ====
The Avalon Geelong Express service operated between Avalon Airport and South Geelong railway station, with an intermediate stop at Geelong railway station. The service began in July 2017. The service operated to a timetable that was adjusted monthly, with one service connecting to every flight departing and arriving at Avalon Airport. The service was suspended during the COVID-19 pandemic and has not resumed as of February 2024.

==== Gold Coast Airport ====
In December 2017, SkyBus launched airport shuttle services to the Gold Coast Airport from various hotels. From 16 September 2018, the Byron Bay Express commenced running services from Gold Coast Airport to Byron Bay. The services were suspended during the COVID-19 pandemic and has not resumed as of February 2024.

==== Melbourne Airport ====
===== Southbank Docklands Express =====
The Southbank Docklands Express operated between Terminal 4 of Melbourne Airport and four designated stops in Southbank, with an intermediate stop in Docklands. The service began in November 2017, operating to similar frequencies and hours as the St Kilda Express. Fares were identical to that of the Melbourne City Express service. The service was suspended during the COVID-19 pandemic and has not resumed as of February 2024.

===== St Kilda Express =====
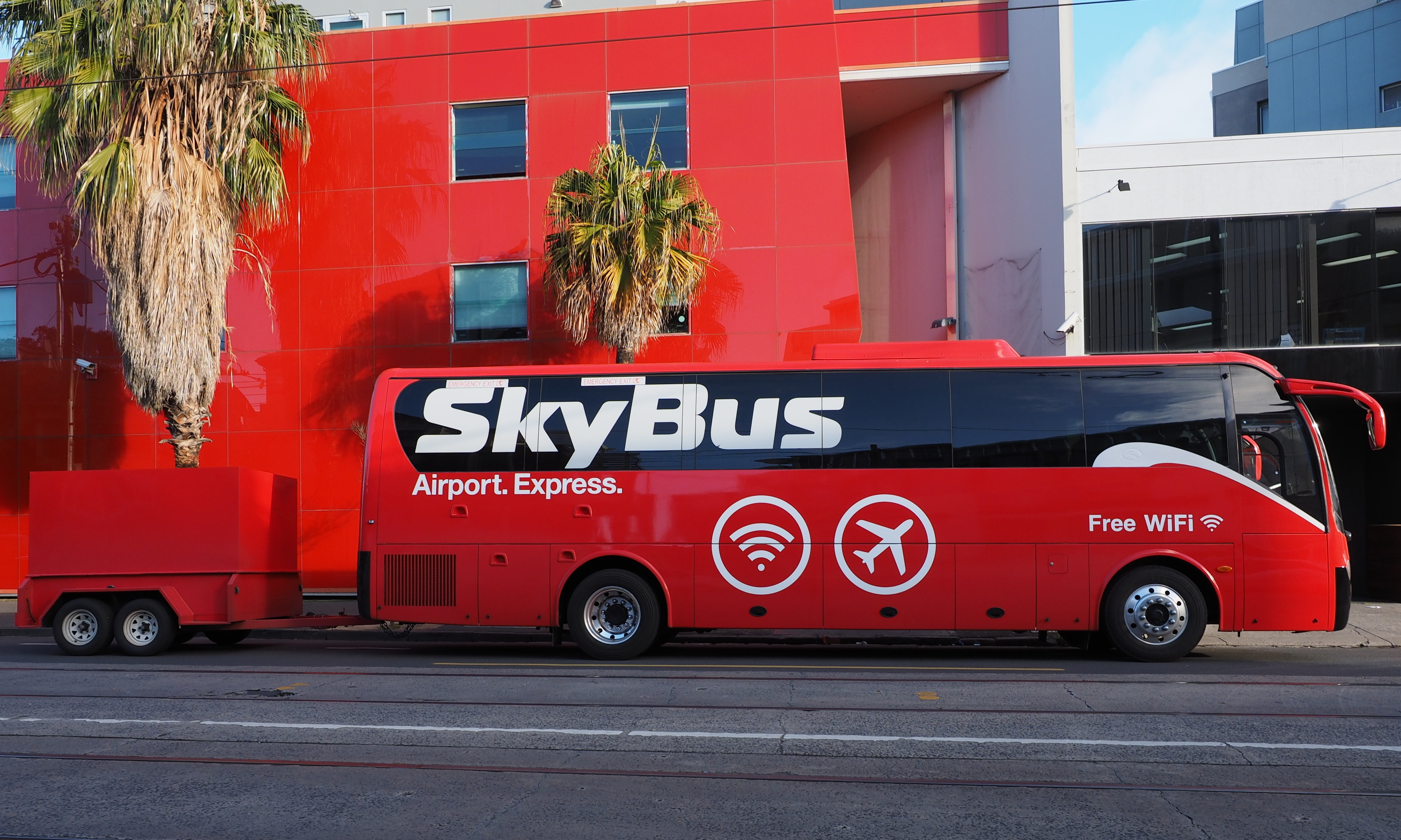
A SkyBus bus in St Kilda during 2016

The St Kilda Express service operated between Terminal 4 of Melbourne Airport and four designated stops in St Kilda, picking up and setting down passengers at these stops. Outbound passengers could also be picked up at Terminal 1. The service operated daily, including all public holidays, to a 30-minute frequency on weekdays and hourly on weekends. Operating hours are approximately between 6:30 am and 7:00 pm daily. Services were suspended in 2021, with the route later being subsumed into the Peninsula Express.

===== Western Express =====
The Western Express operated between Terminal 4 of Melbourne Airport and Werribee, with an intermediate stop at Tarneit railway station. Outbound passengers could also be picked up at Terminal 1. The service operated daily, including all public holidays, between 5:05 am and 8:35 pm daily. The service was suspended during the COVID-19 pandemic and has not resumed as of February 2024.

=== New Zealand ===
==== Auckland Airport ====
SkyBus operated services to Auckland Airport. Services were indefinitely suspended in 2021.

The Auckland City Express operated between the airport and the SkyBus Lounge in the Auckland CBD, running via the Southwestern Motorway, either Dominion Road or Mount Eden Road, and Queen Street.

The North Harbour Express service operated between the airport and Albany (referred to by SkyBus as Albany Westfield because of the nearby Westfield Albany shopping mall). Services ran along the Northern Busway on the North Shore section of the route, stopping at Smales Farm and Akoranga stations.

== Fleet ==
As at September 2023, the combined fleets consisted of 68 vehicles.
