= Quince's Scenicruisers =

Bus operator based in Melbourne, Australia

- Parent: Australian Transit Group
- Headquarters: Oakleigh
- Locale: Melbourne
- Service type: Bus & coach charter operator
- Fleet: 36 (November 2023)
- Website: www.quinces.com.au

Quince's Scenicruisers is a bus and coach charter operator in Melbourne, Australia.

== History ==
In 1951 Quince's Scenicruisers operated route 103A Oakleigh - Clayton - Moorabbin. In 1967 Quince's joined with Melbourne Motor Coach Service and McGeary's Parlor Coaches to form Australian Pacific Tours. Quince's later withdrew from the partnership.

After the State Government decided to open private routes to open tender, in 1988 Quince's were awarded the rights to operate some services of Ventura Bus Lines and Waverley Transit. Waverley Transit won a legal case and the contract between Quince's and The Met was ruled void.

Quince's had already taken delivery of 24 Hino AC140s and 40 Mercedes-Benz O405s. These entered service on two new routes 634 Middle Brighton station - Monash University/East Clayton and 705 Springvale - Mordialloc.

In February 1998, following 18 months of unsuccessful negotiations with the Department of Infrastructure over a new contract, Quince's relinquished their route licences. By this stage they were operating routes 615 Box Hill - North Balwyn, 631 Westfield Southland - Mitcham station, 634 Lilydale - Monash University, 705 Mordialloc - Springvale, 708 Mordialloc - Carrum and 731 Camberwell - North Balwyn. These were split amongst Invicta Bus Services, Moorabbin Transit, National Bus Company and Ventura Bus Lines. Since then it has operated as a bus and coach charter operator. In September 2015 the business was purchased by the Australian Transit Group.

== Fleet ==
As at November 2023, the fleet consists of 36 buses and coaches.
