= Portsea Passenger Service =

Bus Operator

- Parent: Grenda Corporation
- Ceased operation: January 2012
- Headquarters: Rosebud
- Service area: South Eastern Melbourne
- Service type: Bus operator
- Routes: 4
- Hubs: Frankston station
- Fleet: 45 (April 2014)

Portsea Passenger Service was a bus operator in Melbourne, Australia. As a Melbourne bus company, it operated four bus routes under contract to the Government of Victoria. A subsidiary of Grenda Corporation, it was purchased by Ventura Bus Lines in January 2012.

== History ==
In February 1983 Portsea Passenger Service was purchased by Grenda Corporation. In January 2012, it was included in the sale of Grenda Corporation to Ventura Bus Lines and the brand was retired.

== Fleet ==
As at April 2014 the fleet consisted of 45 buses coaches. Portsea Passenger Service adopted the same cream and three blues as sister company Peninsula Bus Lines. It later adopted the standard white with red and yellow flashes of Grenda Corporation.
