= Buses in Melbourne =

Australian Transportation

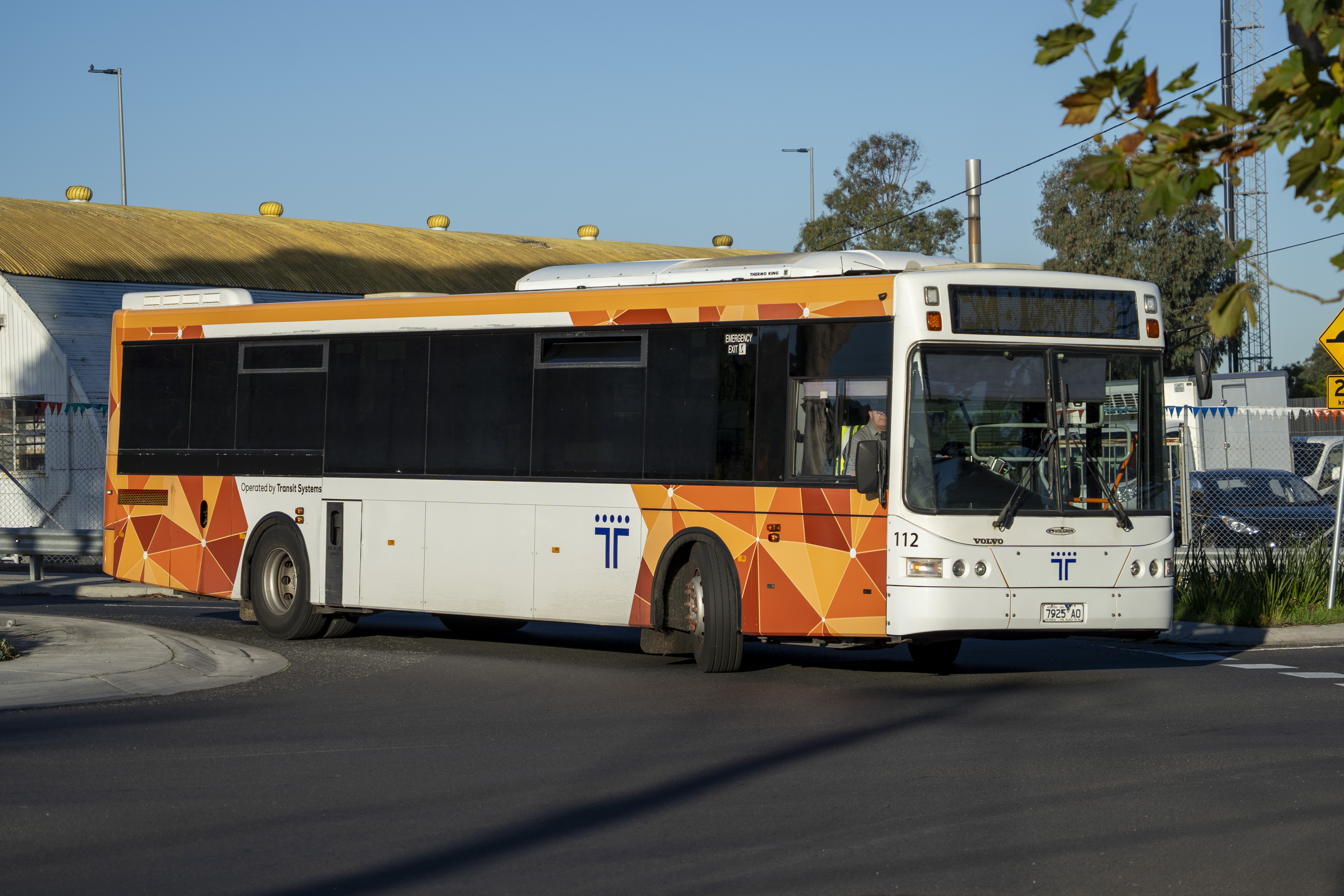
- A Transit Systems Victoria operated Volgren CR228L bus in Sunshine, June 2026

Overview
- Owner: Public Transport Victoria
- Locale: Melbourne, Victoria; Australia
- Transit type: Bus
- Annual ridership: 114.9 million
- Website: Public Transport Victoria

Operation
- Began operation: 1912; 114 years ago
- Operators: CDC Melbourne; Cranbourne Transit; Dysons; Kinetic Melbourne; Martyrs Bus Service; McKenzie's Tourist Services; Sunbury Bus Service; Transit Systems Victoria; Ventura Bus Lines

Buses in Melbourne, Australia, are a major form of public transport in Melbourne, with an extensive bus network. There are around 400 routes in operation with a varying range of service frequencies, (including the Night Network and SmartBus Network, excluding Kew School Services) operated by privately owned bus companies under franchise from the State Government, under the Public Transport Victoria branding. Most of the bus network is covered by the myki ticketing system.

Several private operators provide bus services to Melbourne's major airports, the most significant of which is SkyBus. These services do not utilise the myki ticketing system.

Some local government councils operate free local community bus services within their local areas. There are also tourist bus services in the CBD and nearby tourist attractions.

While the city relies predominantly on an inner-city tram network and radial train network, the outer suburbs of Melbourne are primarily serviced by bus. Melbourne's buses also provide a local feeder to Melbourne's train and tram network.

== Current public transport bus operators ==
Operator	Contract name (if any)	Start date of current contract	End date of current contract	Reference	Region	Routes
CDC Melbourne	Dark Blue	1 July 2025	30 June 2035		North west Melbourne	See List of bus routes in Melbourne
CDC Melbourne	Purple and Orange	1 July 2025	30 June 2035		Western Melbourne	See List of bus routes in Melbourne
CDC Melbourne	Teal	1 July 2025	30 June 2035		South east Melbourne	See List of bus routes in Melbourne
Cranbourne Transit		1 August 2018	30 June 2028		Cranbourne	See List of bus routes in Melbourne
Dysons	Green and Pink	1 July 2025	30 June 2035		North-east Melbourne	See List of bus routes in Melbourne
Kinetic Melbourne	Metropolitan Bus Franchise	31 January 2022	30 June 2031		Inner-west and inner-east Melbourne	See List of bus routes in Melbourne
Kinetic Melbourne	Brown	1 July 2025	30 June 2035		Inner-north Melbourne	See List of bus routes in Melbourne
Martyrs Bus Service (Owned by Dineen Group)		1 August 2018	30 June 2025 (original, since extended)		Yarra Valley	See List of bus routes in Melbourne
McKenzie's Tourist Services (Owned by Dineen Group)		1 August 2018	30 June 2025 (original, since extended)		Yarra Valley	See List of bus routes in Melbourne
SkyBus (Owned by Kinetic Group)		1 July 2018	30 June 2023 (original, since extended)		Melbourne Airport	See List of bus routes in Melbourne
Sunbury Bus Service (Owned by Donric Group)		1 July 2018	30 June 2028		Sunbury	See List of bus routes in Melbourne
Transit Systems Victoria		1 July 2018	30 June 2028		Inner-west and western Melbourne	See List of bus routes in Melbourne
Ventura Bus Lines		1 July 2018	30 June 2028		Eastern and south-east Melbourne	See List of bus routes in Melbourne

== History ==
=== Early history ===
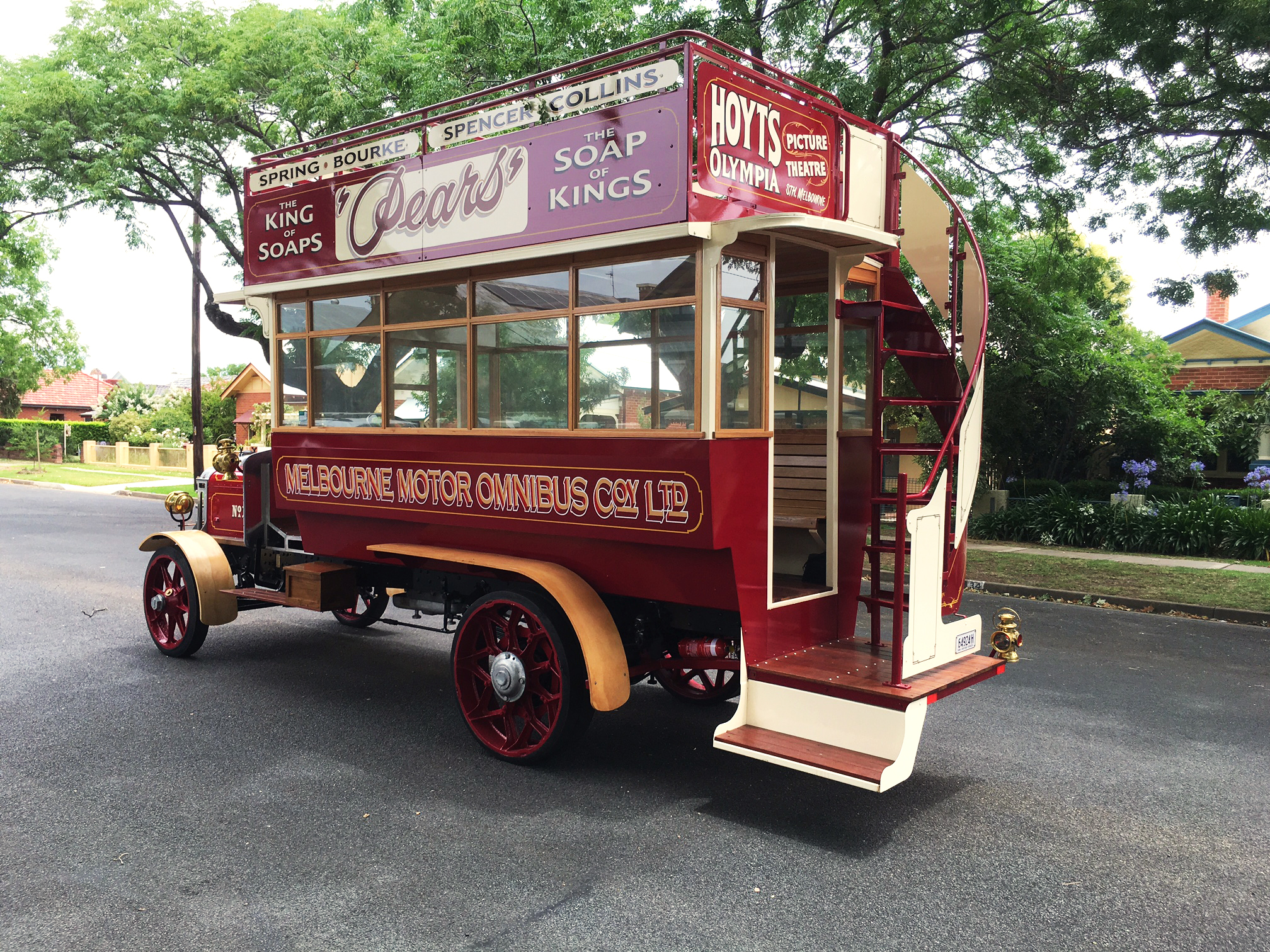
Daimler CC Bus 1912, one of five imported by Melbourne Motor Omnibus Company and was in service until 1920

The Melbourne Motor Omnibus Company was formed in 1912 to be the first motor bus operator in Melbourne. The company imported a Daimler CC bus from England, which was put to exhaustive tests under local conditions. The bus held 20 persons inside and 14 to 16 on the upper deck. The bus was imported as a complete vehicle, but for future buses cab chassis were to be imported with local Australian coach builders able to make the bus body following the example from the test vehicle.

The Daimler CC bus arrived in November 1912, and featured a Knight sleeve valve engine rated at 40 h.p., a silent chain type gearing system and a worm type gear box. This was the same vehicle that the London County Council had just ordered 400 units of to extend their services around London.

On Christmas Eve 1912 it was reported that the Daimler CC Double Decker bus "glided swiftly and silently along the city streets". The bus at this stage was soon to be plying for hire between Brunswick East and Swanston Street. In January 1913 it was reported that the Daimler bus had been remarkably well patronised with the bus complimented for its "smooth running of the engine, noiseless gears, and the quiet and easy manner in which the load is taken up when starting".

On 25 January it was reported that the Lord Mayor of Melbourne (Councillor Hennessy) and members of the Melbourne City Council were treated to a bus ride to St Kilda and back on one of the Daimler buses that the Melbourne Omnibus Motor Company was about to put into service. By the end of February another shipment of Daimler buses was to be imported. At this time the company had drawn up contracts for the construction of the bodies locally. The design was to be based on the same as used on the Daimler bus bodies used in London.

In May 1913 it was reported that a number of routes had been established and at this time a new line between St Kilda and Brunswick East had been opened.

In November 1913 it was documented that the Melbourne Motor Omnibus Company employed over 100 people. In regard to the imported Daimler bus fleet, Australian contractors had at this time completed 18 bus bodies. One of the main local contractors used for the coach building was Messrs. Jas. Flood and Co.

January 1914 the newspapers advised that the Melbourne Motor Omnibus Company was considering implementing an all night bus service between the city and the principal suburbs.

March 1914 also saw the inauguration of half hourly bus services on a Sunday between Melbourne and Prahran. At this time routes also existed through the city to St Kilda, North Melbourne, Flemington Bridge, Brunswick, Doncaster and Heidelberg. In June 1914 the business commenced a trial run of daily services to Kew. In October 1914 Sunday morning routes were established from Fitzroy and Northcote to Melbourne.

In July 1914 the Melbourne Motor Omnibus Company moved the garaging of all its buses to Tinning Street, Melbourne. At this time the business had 20 Daimler buses in service, two due to be put into service within a week, and three more by the end of the month, making 25 the total Daimler fleet.

On 5 November 1914 it was documented that the Sunshine Motor Company who were the national distributors of Daimler commercial vehicles had 22 Daimler bus and truck chassis sold but before they could set sail for Australia from England war was declared. Vehicles from the Daimler factory had been commandeered by the British Government and this would be so while the war was on. With the outbreak of war and the British Governments ban on the export of motor buses the Melbourne Motor Omnibus company could not increase its fleet to adequately meet the increased demand for services. The total number of passengers carried for the year ended 30 June 1914 was 3,141,000 and covered some 459,345 miles. This meant the average Daimler bus in service travelled 34,020 miles.

In addition to the Daimler double decker buses in operation by the Melbourne Motor Omnibus Co, many of Melbourne's private bus operators began by running jitney-style seven-seat buses. The use of these small buses may have been an attempt to circumvent State government road regulations. While some of the early operators ran fixed routes with regular timetables, there was no State Government agency to regulate the routes, or officially recognise them. A number of companies competed with trams, running along tram routes but charging lower fares. The Motor Omnibus Act of 1924 disallowed bus competition along tramway routes.

The Trak Motor-bus Company was founded in 1923 by the bus pioneer and distinguished naval officer Fred Knight, with three other partners. All four men were former officers in the Royal Navy. Knight also established the Kintrack Motorbus Company in January 1924, with buses on the city to Caulfield route commencing in March 1924. Kintrak had the distinction of being the first to employ female bus conductors.

Ventura Bus Lines was founded in 1924 by Harry Cornwall, who began operating a bus route between Box Hill and the city, and later ran buses along dirt tracks between Box Hill and Mentone, which roughly equated to the 700 bus route, later integrated into the orbital 903 bus route. Ventura's first depot was at a petrol station on the corner of Station Street and Canterbury Road, in Box Hill South.

In 1925, the Melbourne & Metropolitan Tramways Board (M&MTB) introduced the first tramways buses. Its first bus route ran down Swanston Street from La Trobe Street, and along Glen Huntly Road to Elsternwick station.

By the 1960s, unlike other Australian cities which had replaced their trams with buses, Melbourne was the only one which retained its major tram network. Melbourne resisted the trend to abolish tram systems partly because its wide streets, and generally geometric street pattern, made the use of trams more practicable than in many other cities. There was also the steadfast leadership of the chairman of the M&MTB, Robert Risson, who argued strongly that trams remained an efficient way of transporting large numbers of people, and that the cost of ripping up the concrete-embedded tram tracks would be prohibitive.

Grenda Corporation was founded in 1945 by George Grenda. After selling his milk truck, he purchased six small buses, four bus routes, and the primary foundations of a bus depot in Dandenong that eventually became Grenda's Bus Services.

=== 1950s – 1960s ===
From the 1950s onwards, Melbourne's bus operators began replacing jitneys with full-size buses.

Post World War II, bus use in Melbourne peaked in 1952–1953 at 157 million passenger trips. Melbourne's total population at the time was 1.5 million meaning that on average each resident used a bus 100 times per year.

Between 1952 and 1969, Ventura purchased Clarinda Transport, High Street Road Bus Service and Knibbs Bus Service. It also added a service between Blackburn and Clayton (roughly equivalent to the current 703 service), added Glen Waverley and East Burwood services, and (in 1957) opened its Oakleigh South depot at the corner of Centre and Warrigal Roads. Also during this time-frame, Ventura closed its Box Hill South depot and replaced it with a new depot at Mahoney's Road, East Burwood.

Unlike Melbourne's train and tram networks, up until the 1950s, buses in Melbourne were operated in a largely unregulated free market by private companies.

During the 1960s, the MMTB took over services in the north-eastern suburbs, after the bankruptcy of the private operator. The services would eventually be sold to the National Bus Company. The Tramways Board took the unprecedented step of running its buses to the same level of service as its trams – every 10 to 20 minutes until midnight seven days a week.

In 1969, Ventura purchased several bus routes around Mitcham from C Young.

=== 1970s ===
In 1970, Ventura acquired Boronia Bus Lines; the two purchases added 12 route services to the company.

Kefford Corporation entered the Victorian bus market in January 1976, when it acquired Point Cook - Werribee Passenger Service.

In 1973 Grenda purchased Peninsula Bus Lines and started Volgren in 1978 also based in Dandenong which has now become Australia's largest bus builder.

==== Regulation ====
The collapse of many bus companies led to State Government intervention in Melbourne's bus network in the 1970s. Buses would eventually fall under the responsibility of the Public Transport Corporation. The Public Transport Corporation would take over running ticketing for Melbourne's bus network, and would contract out the operation of routes to various private operators.

=== 1980s ===
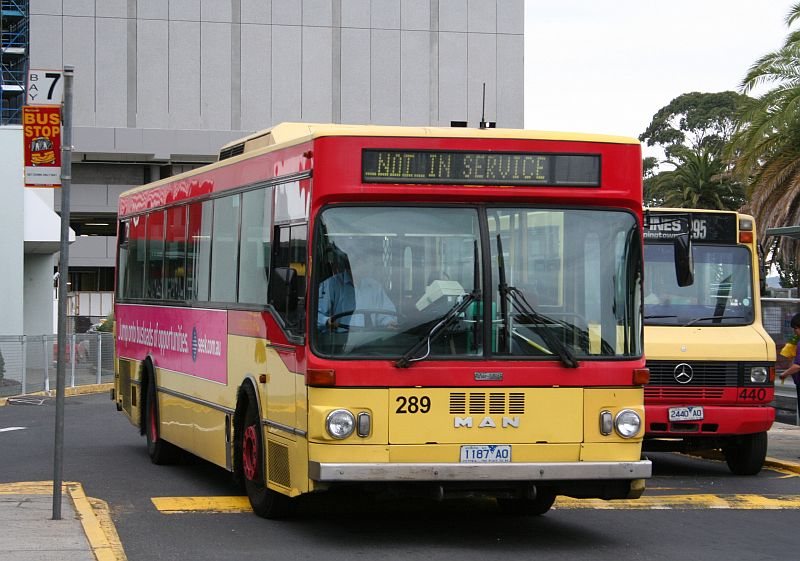
National Bus Company Ansair bodied MAN SL200 at Westfield Doncaster

By 1980–1981, bus patronage had fallen to a low of 71.5 million passenger trips for a population of 2.8 million - meaning that trips per capita had fallen to 25 per annum.

In December 1981, Kefford Corporation expanded its bus business beyond Melbourne, when it acquired Davis Motor Service in Ballarat.

In 1983, Grenda also expanded with the purchase of Portsea Passenger Service consolidating their presence on the Mornington Peninsula.

In July 1983, the Metropolitan Transit Authority, was formed under the Transport Act 1983 to integrate Melbourne's tram, train, and bus services. The Metropolitan Transit Authority, commonly known as "The Met", would manage Melbourne's bus network through its Bus and Tram Division, as well as operating the tramways bus services.

The reforms included the integration of bus, train, and tram tickets. From 1983 onwards, the State Government began collecting all revenue from the multi-modal tickets, with private bus operators receiving money for costs one month in advance. Unfortunately, the State Government had trouble increasing the fixed-ticket subsidies in line with inflation. The State Government would introduce a moratorium on new bus purchases, as well as make attempts at forcing the consolidation of the numbers of private bus operators, in attempt to overcome the subsidy problem.

==== Go or Grow ====
In an attempt to cut costs, the Cain Government wanted to reduce the number of private operators, while increasing the number of cross-city bus routes. At this stage Melbourne's bus network (aside from the Met buses) was run by a large number of small, family operators which ran no more than a handful of routes each. The Cain Government reasoned that it would be more efficient, and cost effective, to have bus services provided by no more than about half a dozen large companies than dozens of small ones: larger operators would bring in economies of scale on bus purchases, repair costs, staffing, and would require fewer depots. The State Government also believed that it would be easier to negotiate contracts with a smaller number of large bus companies than with a large number of small bus companies. Thus the government put pressure on many of the small operators, in 1986, to either "Go or Grow."

In response to the State Government's "Go or Grow" policy, particularly between 1986 and 1988, there was consolidation in the bus industry. 1986 saw Driver Bus Lines amalgamate with Shave Bus Service to form Waverley Transit. The consolidation of small family operators continued into 1987, when Ventura acquired Bentleigh Bus Lines, Rennies Bus Services, Willis Bus Services and Hawthorn Bus Services. As a result of these purchases, Ventura sold its East Burwood depot and replaced it with its larger Knoxfield depot. In August 1987, Kefford Corporation acquired the Bono Bus Services which served Footscray, Highpoint City, and East Keilor. Also in 1987, Cunningham Bus Lines (who operated route 503), Essendon to Brunswick East) was taken over by Moonee Valley Coaches.

The consolidations continued when, in January 1988, Kefford Corporation acquired Sitch Bus Services (which served Sunshine, North Sunshine, St Albans, Footscray, Yarraville, Altona, Laverton, and Williamstown), as well as Sinclair Bus Services (which served Monash University, Elwood, and Gardenvale). August 1988 saw Southland Bus Service (which operated the 645 Southland – Mentone – Sandringham, 652 Southland – Beaumaris, 654 Moorabbin – Southland - Clayton - Westall, 655 Chadstone – Murrumbeena – Southland, 656 Moorabbin – Clayton, and shared the 636 Chadstone – Hughesdale – Southland with Ventura) was taken over by the Grenda Corporation. Southland bus lines, along with other Grenda Group acquisitions including Blue & Silver Bus Lines, Hampton Red, Hampton Green, and Camden Bus Lines were amalgamated into Moorabbin Transit.

==== New bus moratorium ====
The bus operators now funded their operations via a state government subsidy, partially funded by multi-modal ticket fare revenue (rather than each bus company issuing their own ticket)'. In another attempt to reduce costs beyond the 'go or grow' policy, the state government refused to subsidise new capital investment into the private bus companies (for instance, spending on new depots) and put a moratorium on the subsidies on bus replacement. Any new additions to the fleets of bus companies would have to be covered out-of-pocket by the bus companies themselves. This policy led to the ageing of the bus fleet through the late 1980s and into the 1990s, though would later be lifted.

==== Quince's ====
In 1988, the then Metropolitan Transit Authority (Met) called for tenders on all of Melbourne's bus routes. Prior to the completion of tenders, Met employees reportedly told Waverley Transit 'not to bother' entering tenders for some of their existing routes. At the completion of the tender process, seven bus routes previously operated by Ventura, and three previously operated by Waverley Transit were tendered out to a company called Quince's Scenicruisers, which had 60 buses used mostly for charter and school services.

In the case Waverley Transit vs Metropolitan Transit Authority, Waverley Transit launched a Supreme Court challenge to the results of the tendering process. The verdict deemed that the state government had acted inappropriately during the tendering process and restored the bus routes to Ventura and Waverley Transit. In the wake of this verdict, the Met launched an appeal, with Waverley Transit launching a counter-appeal; the cases lasted into the early 1990s, with Waverley Transit ultimately successful.

In spite of this, Quince received the rights to operate a number of new cross-suburban bus routes cutting across a number of bus operator territories, including a route from Brighton to Lilydale.

=== 1990s ===
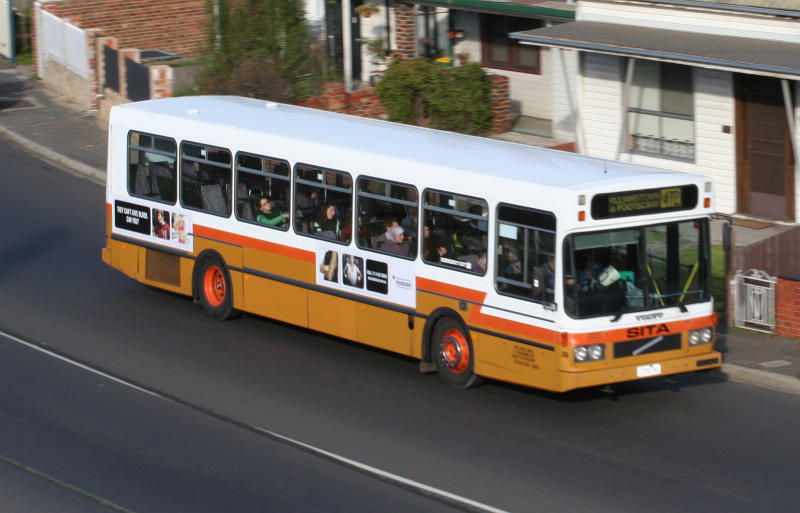
Sita Buslines route service bus

By the 1990s, the Government subsidy required to operate Melbourne's public transport network was hundreds of millions of dollars a year. The Cain Labor Government tried to introduce economies in the running of the system, which provoked a long and crippling strike by the powerful transport unions in January 1990. In October 1992 the Liberals came to power under Premier Jeff Kennett. The Kennett Government pledged corporatisation of Melbourne's public transport network; however, policy shifted to supporting the privatisation of the tram system in the wake of a series of public transport union strikes.

==== Deregulation and privatisation ====
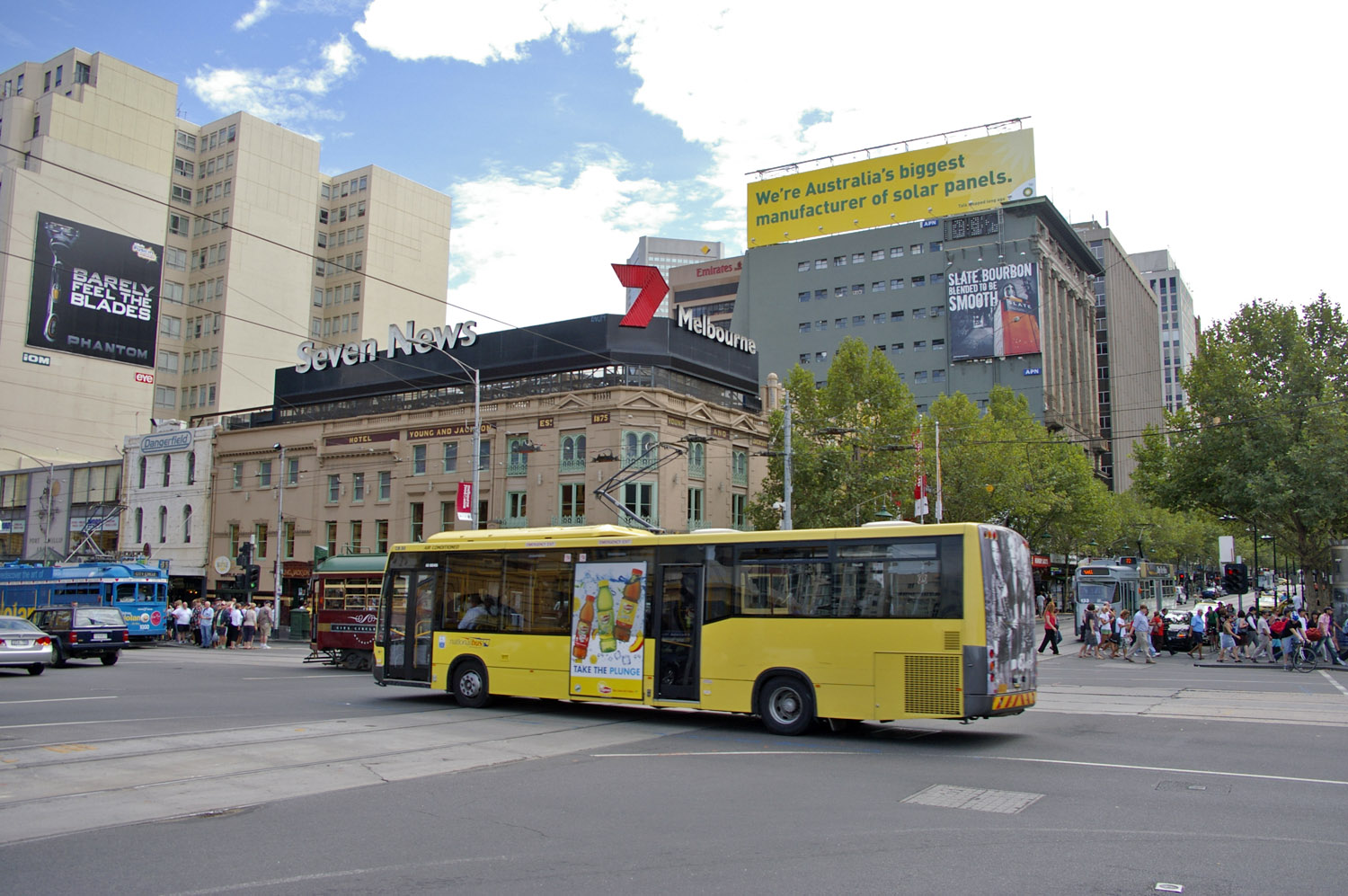
National Bus Company MAN 15.220

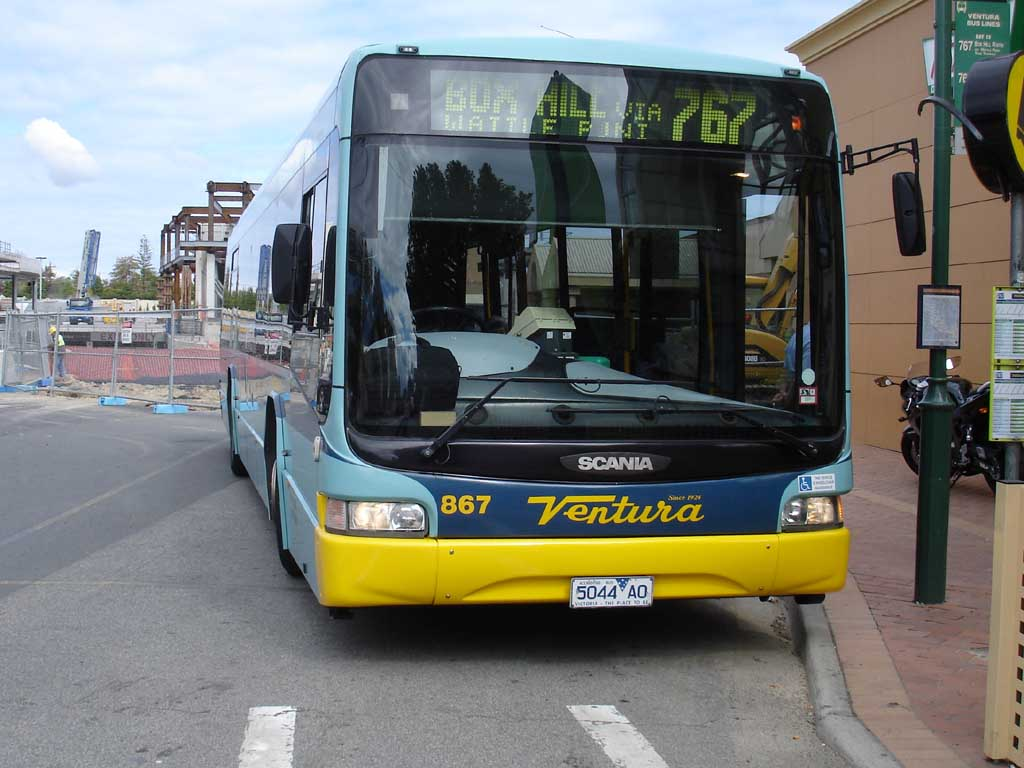
Ventura Bus Lines bus parked at the Chadstone Shopping Centre bus terminus

The Kennett Government privatised the State-run bus routes. National Bus Company purchased the Public Transport Corporation's bus services in the Northern and Northeastern suburbs of Melbourne, centred around Doncaster.

National Bus Company commenced operations on 27 December 1993 with a fleet made up of former Government owned buses including MAN SL200s and Volvo B59s. The company acquired two depots located at Doncaster and Fitzroy North.

In 1994, National introduced the first of 56 Mercedes-Benz LO812 mini buses. These buses were introduced under National's plan to introduce bus services in local areas previously not serviced by bus routes.

In addition, between 1997 and 2005, National has undergone extensive fleet modernisation programs to phase out Volvo B59s and early model MAN SL200s. This has involved the purchase of 68 Mercedes-Benz O405 series buses along with 53 low floor MAN buses.

In 1996, Grenda purchased Berwick Bus Lines and amalgamated the business with its Pakenham depot to form Cardinia Transit.

A 1997 press release from then Transport Minister Robin Cooper announced that a consortium of Reservoir Bus Company and Dysons were the preferred bidders for the remainder of the Public Transport Corporation's bus routes (particularly in the inner city). In 1998, the routes were sold to the consortium, which operated under the name Melbourne Bus Link.

In 1998, Quince's lost their bus routes. Ironically, Quince's long cross-suburban bus routes were broken up, with sections divided between Ventura, Moorabbin Transit and Driver (for instance, the Monash University – Brighton leg of one Quince's route became part of Ventura route 703, the Glen Waverley – Mitcham section became part of Ventura route 736).

Contracting for bus services in Melbourne and throughout Victoria had occurred from 1 July 1989 until 1999 through the Public Transport Corporation engaging bus operators under subsidised contracting arrangements. In late 1999, the Director of Public Transport was established as the Government agency which procured bus services and entered into bus contracts with operators for Melbourne and large parts of Victoria.

=== 2000s – 2010s ===
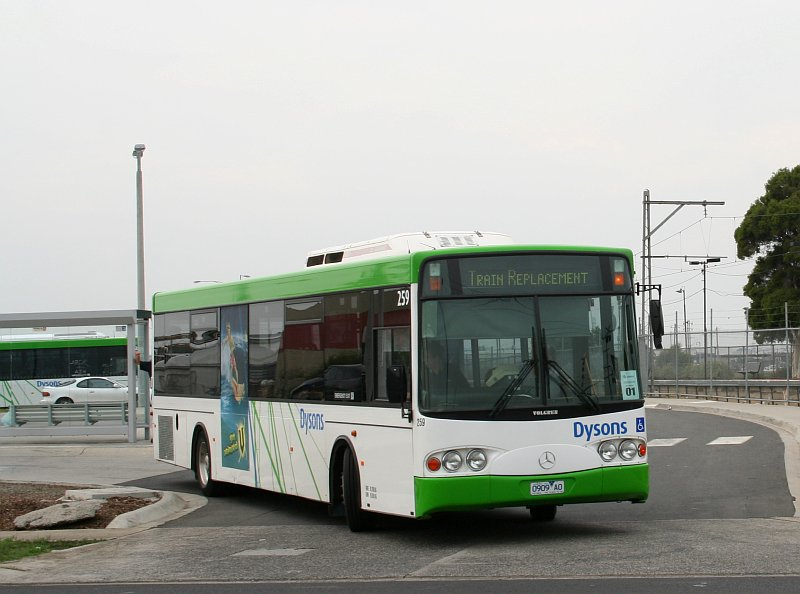
Dysons Volgren bodied Mercedes-Benz O405NH route bus at Upfield railway station

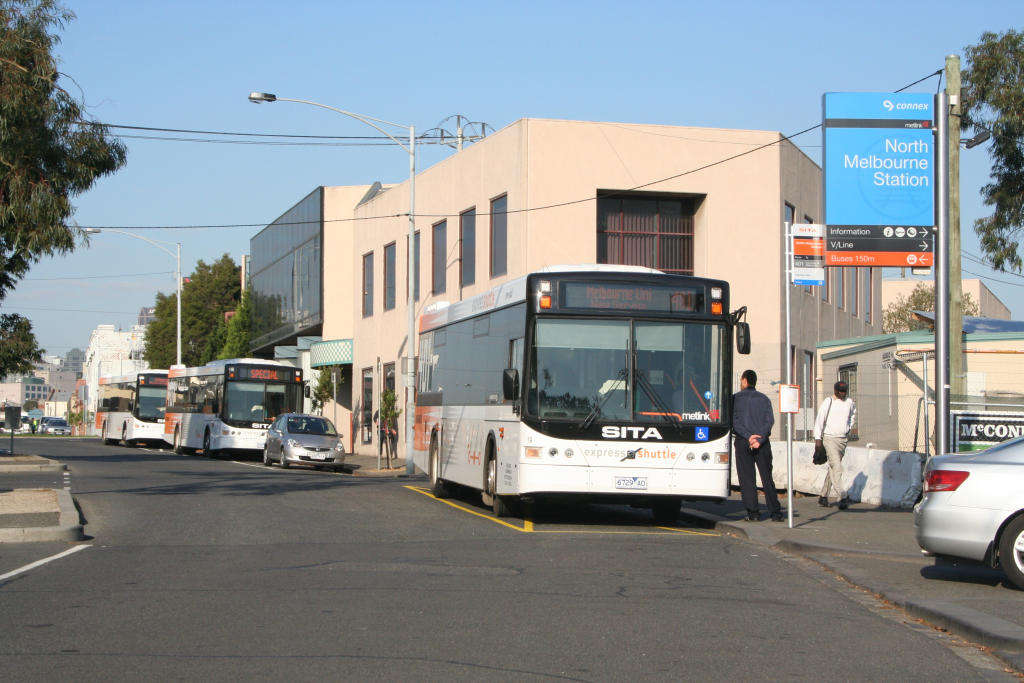
The route 401 prepaid shuttle from North Melbourne railway station to the University of Melbourne

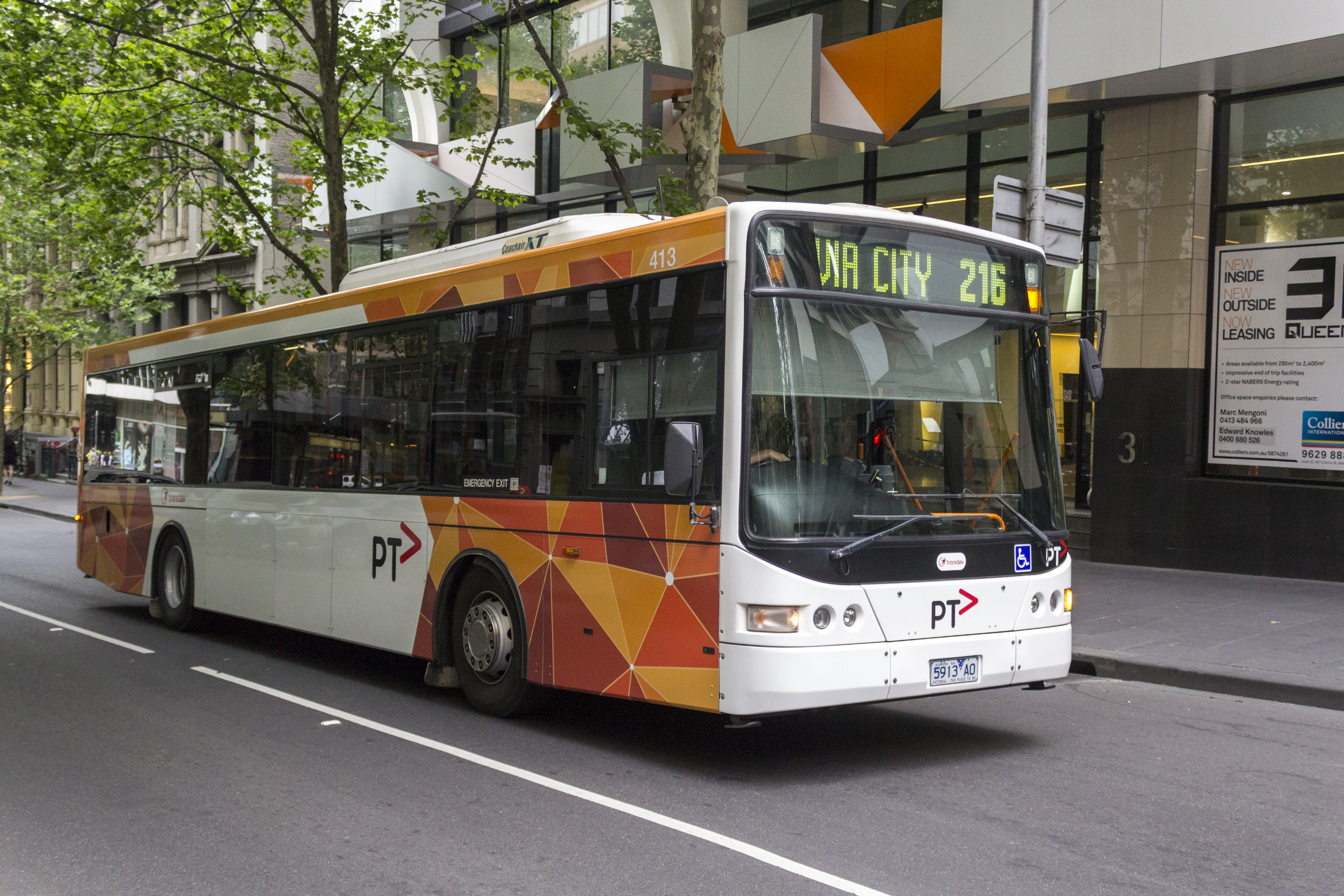
Transdev Melbourne Volgren bodied Scania K230UB in December 2013

In 2000, Ventura purchased Mount Dandy Bus, while in June of that same year, Kefford Corporation acquired Benders Buslines of Geelong. In August 2003, Dysons acquired the Nixon Group, which was the parent company of Bell Transit, Cobb & Co, and Rambler Tours.

2002 saw the sale of Sandringham Charter Coaches to the Dineen Group, it now operates under the Sandringham & Brighton Coaches brand.

Grenda purchased Frankston Passenger Service in 2002 and merged it with its Peninsula Bus Lines.

In 2004, Ventura purchased the National Bus Company from National Express for A$45 million, becoming the largest private bus operator in Melbourne. While the company has announced that it would continue to use the National Bus Company brand until bus contracts came under re-tender in July 2008, new National Buses are painted in the Ventura livery. Through National Express, Ventura purchased what remains of the old government fleet, which is often of particular interest to railfans, though this section of the fleet will be phased out over the coming years. Also in 2004, in September, Chris' Coaches (which also traded under the 'Melbourne on the Move' brand, and formerly operated Hope Street Bus Line) changed its name to Olympic Coaches.

2006 saw the acquisition of McKenzie's Tourist Services by the Dineen Group. In 2007, Moreland Bus Lines purchased a 50% stake in the Broadmeadows Bus Service. This was later sold in 2010.

In 2007, Grenda purchased Blue Ridge Coaches and followed up in 2008 with the purchase of Hastings Coaches, both were integrated into Peninsula Bus Lines and depot in Hastings was established.

In 2008, Dysons acquired Northern Bus Lines and ComfortDelGro Cabcharge entered the Melbourne market with acquisition of the bus operations of Kefford Corporation. 2009 saw the acquisition of Invicta Bus Services by Grenda Corporation, and US Bus Lines by Ventura. Ventura also acquired the Ivanhoe Bus Company in 2010.

In 2012, Ventura Bus Lines purchased Grenda Corporation making it the largest privately owned bus company in Australia. Ventura has 15 depots located in Doncaster, Oakleigh, Fitzroy, Ivanhoe, Dandenong, Lilydale, Knoxfield, Moorabbin, Croydon, Monbulk, Rosebud, Cardinia, Seaford, Hastings and Keysborough. In the same year Dysons acquired neighbouring company's Reservoir Bus Company and Midland Tours.

In the 2013-2014 financial year, a total of 127.6 million passenger trips were recorded on Melbourne's buses by its 4.3 million residents. While this was an increase of 10.2 percent on the previous year and continued the trend of the previous decade, patronage was still only 29 trips per capita per annum.

In 2013, Transdev Melbourne took over the Melbourne Metropolitan Bus Franchise routes including three SmartBus routes from Melbourne Bus Link and National Bus Company. The franchise was to run for seven years with an option to extend for a further three years. In December 2018, it was announced by the government that the three years extension option will not be taken up.

In 2019, Transit Systems entered the Melbourne market by acquiring Sita Buslines and its operations.

==== Bus contracting ====
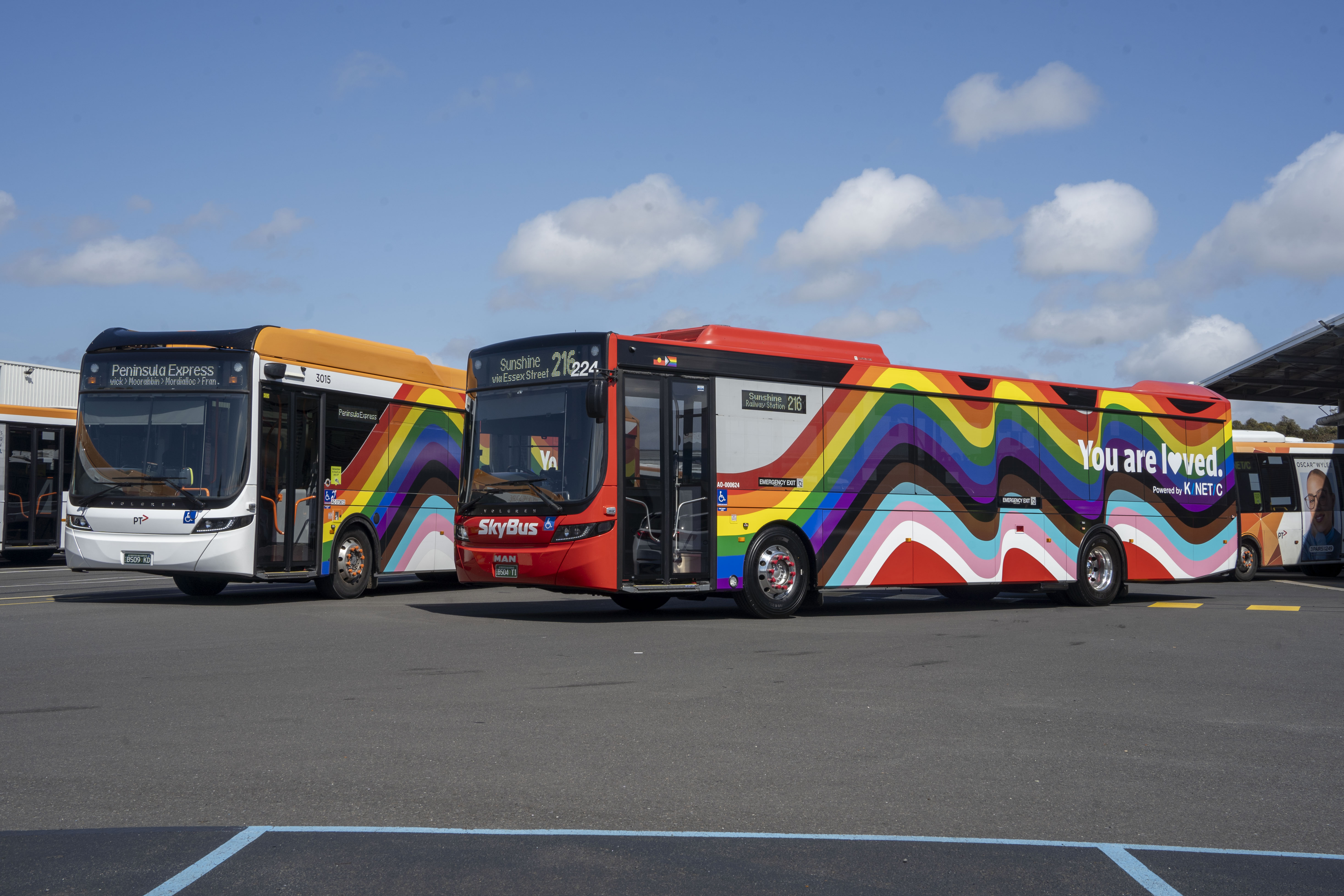
A pair of Kinetic Melbourne special 'pride' liveried buses, a Volgren bodied BYD D9RA and MAN 19.320 respectively, at Sunshine bus depot in October 2024

29 new metropolitan bus contracts came into effect on 1 July 2008, with the contracts held by National Bus Company and Melbourne Bus Link running for five years, while the other 27 contracts running for 7 years with a possible 3-year extension. At the end of the 5-year contracts, the National Bus Company and Melbourne Bus Link routes were tendered out as the Melbourne Metropolitan Bus Franchise, which was awarded to Transdev Melbourne and commenced on 1 August 2013. The other 27 contracts all received the 3-year extensions and would end in 2018.

As the existing contracts were expiring soon, the Victorian Government announced contract reforms introducing new performance-based contracts in April 2018, with Ventura Bus Lines, CDC Melbourne and Donric Group agreeing to commence 10-year contracts on 1 July 2018. Transdev Melbourne is not part of the contract reform as it operates the separate Melbourne Metropolitan Bus Franchise. However, BusVic and many other bus operators were unsatisfied with the conditions of the contracts, which require operators to transfer any of their assets to the government. Throughout May and June, BusVic and the operators held protests outside the Victorian Parliament House to oppose the new contracts. In June 2018, in response to the backlash, the government offered a seven-year contract to all Melbourne bus operators, with no end-of-term access to staff, depots, fleet and intellectual property. This meant that under this contract, operators are not obliged to transfer any of their assets to the government. Cranbourne Transit, Sita Buslines, Ventura and Donric continued to commence the original 10-year contracts, which end on 30 June 2028, while the other operators, including CDC Melbourne, commenced the new 7-year contracts, ending on 30 June 2025.

The Melbourne Metropolitan Bus Franchise was put out to tender and was awarded to Kinetic Melbourne in October 2021, with Kinetic taking over the routes from Transdev on 31 January 2022. As part of the franchise award, 36 fully electric buses would be introduced by mid-2025.

Towards the end of the 7-year contracts that began in 2018, small bus operators MorelandBus and Moonee Valley Coaches sold their public bus operations to Kinetic and Dysons respectively in 2023 and 2024. In September 2024, the Victorian Government awarded new ten-year contracts to Kinetic, Dysons and CDC Melbourne, which would commence after the end of the 7-year contracts on 1 July 2025. As part of CDC Melbourne's bid, Kastoria Bus Lines (including Broadmeadows Bus Service) would transfer its fleet, depot and staff to CDC, in addition to its routes. Meanwhile, Ryan Brothers Bus Service and Panorama Coaches also ceased operating public bus routes. Dysons lost about half of its operating area to CDC and Kinetic, but gained the routes operated by Panorama Coaches.

==== Improvements since 2000 ====
A range of initiatives have been undertaken across Melbourne's bus network, as spelled out in the Melbourne 2030 and Melbourne Transport Plan documents.

These include:

- Improvements to passenger information through consistent Metlink, the Public Transport Victoria, signage.
- The introduction of higher-frequency cross-suburban SmartBus routes.
- Creation of a series of orbital bus routes, based on existing and proposed SmartBus routes.
- Progressively upgrading 250 local routes to specified minimum service levels by the state government's Department of Transport. These upgrades mean that most local routes run until at least 9 pm seven days a week.
- Coordinating bus service reviews based on discussions between local councils, public transport operators and community groups to address issues for service improvements.

Bus usage dropped sharply in 2006, in contrast to rail use which rose sharply, however it has since recovered.

A series of television advertisements for Metlink in 2008 promoted public transport in Melbourne, in particular focusing on bus usage and featuring comedian Frank Woodley.

== Patronage ==
The following table lists patronage figures for the network during the corresponding financial year. Australia's financial years start on 1 July and end on 30 June. Major events that affected the number of journeys made or how patronage is measured are included as notes.

Melbourne metropolitan bus patronage by financial year
2000s	Year	2000–01	2001–02	2002–03	2003–04	2004–05	2005–06	2006–07	2007–08	2008–09	2009–10
2000s	Patronage (millions)	92.0	92.0	93.9	93.6	90.0 (Note: Patronage estimates use a different methodology from 2004–05, resulting in a "step-change" in patronage estimates from 2003–04 to 2004–05.)	79.1 (Note: Figures exclude additional patronage associated with the 2006 Commonwealth Games.)	85.0	91.3	99.5	102.1
2000s	Reference										
2010s	Year	2010–11	2011–12	2012–13	2013–14	2014–15	2015–16	2016–17	2017–18	2018-19	2019-20
2010s	Patronage (millions)	106.1	123.2	115.7	127.6	124.0	122.5	118.0	117.8	121.8	97.9 (Note: Patronage was severely impacted by the COVID-19 pandemic.)
2010s	Reference										
2020s	Year	2020–21	2021–22	2022-23	2023-24						
2020s	Patronage (millions)	58.6 (Note: Patronage was severely impacted by the COVID-19 pandemic.)	66.4 (Note: Patronage was severely impacted by the COVID-19 pandemic.)	99.7	114.9						
2020s	Reference										
View source data.

== SmartBus ==
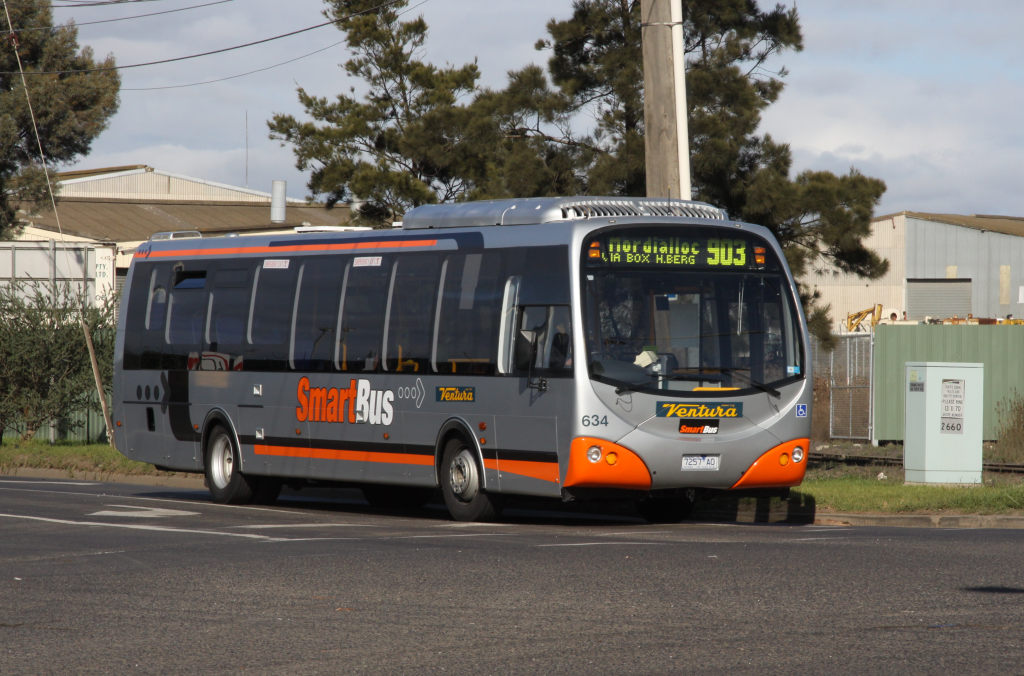
A bus heading towards Mordialloc in silver and orange livery.

The first SmartBus service began operation on 5 August 2002.

Key aspects of this program include longer operating hours, higher service frequency, improved information at bus stops including PIDs at major interchanges, wheelchair accessible services, peak hour priority bus lanes and limited priority at traffic lights.

SmartBus orbital bus network currently consists of nine routes, which is intended to facilitate cross city travel, while the current network is predominantly a radial network.

SmartBus services typically run every 15 minutes on weekday, 30 minutes during evenings.

SmartBus 900, is the first truly dedicated SmartBus service. This service only stops at dedicated stops along the route from Caulfield railway station to Stud Park Shopping Centre in Rowville. SmartBus 900 was introduced to alleviate some of the pressure on the State Government to introduce a rail service to Rowville.

Patronage levels of SmartBus routes are among the highest in Victoria.

== Night Network ==
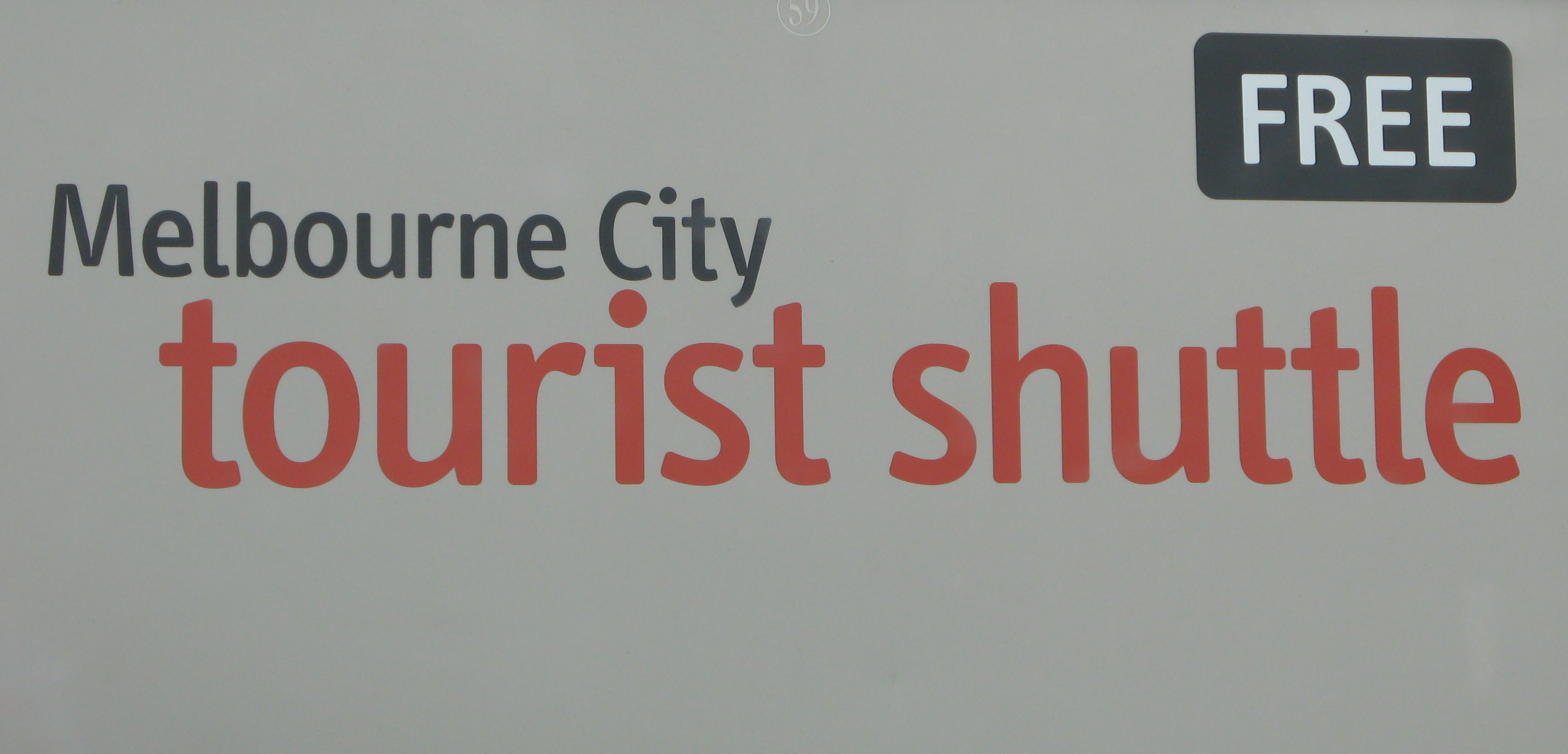
Sign displaying the free Melbourne tourist shuttle bus

Melbourne has 21 dedicated routes which operate after midnight on Friday and Saturday nights using the standard Myki ticketing system. Passengers can board at any designated Night Network bus stop but can also alight at any day bus stop the bus passes. All Night Bus buses are fitted with CCTV surveillance equipment. These routes are operated under the Night Bus brand by Dysons, Ventura and McKenzie's under contract with the Department of Transport.

== Privately operated airport services ==
Operator	Route name	Airport	Major destinations
Skybus	Melbourne City Express	Melbourne	Southern Cross Station
Skybus	Avalon City Express	Avalon	Southern Cross Station
Skybus	Peninsula Express	Melbourne	St Kilda, Brighton, Frankston
Skybus	Eastern Express	Melbourne	Watsonia, Doncaster, Box Hill
Skybus	Sunshine Express	Melbourne	Sunshine
Airport Shuttle Bus	Ballarat	Melbourne	Ballarat, Ballan, Bacchus Marsh, Melton
Bendigo Airport Services	Bendigo	Melbourne	Bendigo, Castlemaine, Kyneton, Gisborne
Airport Bus Dandenong	Dandenong	Melbourne, Avalon	No fixed route, services CBD and inner and outer south-eastern suburbs
Balfours Mooroopna	Shepparton	Melbourne	Shepparton, Seymour, Wallan

Ballarat's Airport Shuttle Bus and Bendigo Airport Services operator also run seasonal services to cruise ships

== Legislation and governance ==
=== Transport Integration Act 2010 ===
The prime statute regulating bus services in Victoria is the Transport Integration Act 2010. The act established the Department of Transport as the integration agency for Victoria's transport system. The act also established and set the charters of the state agencies charged with providing public transport services, including buses. The now-defunct Director of Public Transport was empowered by the act to enter into contracts with operators for the provision of bus and other public transport services. That function was taken over by Public Transport Victoria in 2012, and subsequently transferred to the Department of Transport in July 2019. Specific provisions relating to the contracting regime for buses in Victoria are set out in the Bus Services Act 1995.

=== Bus Services Act 1995 ===
Bus Services Act 1995

Parliament of Victoria
- Long title: An Act to improve the operation of road-based public transport by providing for the accreditation of operators and implementing a system of service contracts for certain types of transport service, to amend the Transport Act 1983 and for other purposes.
- Citation: No. 68 of 1995
- Royal assent: 17 October 1995

The Bus Services Act 1995 (No. 68 of 1995) (previously called the Public Transport Competition Act 1995) sets out a scheme which regulates the bus services contract arrangements between the Director of Public Transport and bus operators.

=== Safety ===
The safety of bus operations in Victoria is regulated by the Bus Safety Act 2009 which applies to all commercial and non-commercial operations. The act creates a framework containing safety duties for all bus industry participants and requires major commercial operators to obtain accreditation prior to commencing operations. Accredited bus operators are also required to have a safety management system to guide their operations.

Sanctions applying to the safety scheme established under the Bus Safety Act 2009 are contained in the Transport (Compliance and Miscellaneous) Act 1983.

=== Safety regulator and investigator ===
The safety regulator for buses in Victoria is the Director, Transport Safety (trading as Transport Safety Victoria), whose office is established under the Transport Integration Act 2010.

Bus operators in Victoria can also be the subject of no blame investigations conducted by the Chief Investigator, Transport Safety. The Chief Investigator is charged by the Transport Integration Act 2010 with conducting investigations into bus safety matters including incidents and trends.

Changes made by the Bus Safety Act 2009 and the Bus Safety Regulations 2010 have required mandatory reporting of the results of annual bus safety inspections since February 2011.

=== Ticketing and conduct ===
Ticketing requirements for buses in Victoria are mainly contained in the Transport (Ticketing) Regulations 2006 and the Victorian Fares and Ticketing Manual. Rules about safe and fair conduct on buses in Victoria are generally contained in the Transport (Compliance and Miscellaneous) Act 1983 and the Transport (Passenger Vehicles) Regulations 2005.

== See also ==
- Transportation in Australia
- Transport Legislation Review
- Rail Safety Act
