= Cardinia Transit =

Australian bus and coach operator

- Parent: Grenda Corporation
- Founded: June 1996
- Ceased operation: January 2012
- Headquarters: Pakenham
- Service area: South Eastern Melbourne
- Service type: Bus & coach operator
- Routes: 15
- Hubs: Westfield Fountain Gate
- Stations: Berwick; Cranbourne; Narre Warren; Pakenham
- Fleet: 77 (April 2014)
- Chief executive: Andrew Cornwall
- Website: www.venturabus.com.au

Cardinia Transit was a bus and coach operator in Melbourne, Australia. As a Melbourne bus company, it operated 15 bus routes under contract to the Government of Victoria. A subsidiary of Grenda Corporation, it was purchased by Ventura Bus Lines in January 2012.

== History ==
Cardinia Transit was formed in June 1996 when Grenda Corporation purchased Berwick Bus Lines and amalgamated them with Grenda's Bus Services' Pakenham depot. It was included in the sale of Grenda Corporation to Ventura Bus Lines in November 2011 and the brand was retired.

== Fleet ==
As at April 2014 the fleet consisted of 77 buses and coaches. Initially Cardinia Transit adopted the cream with red stripes of Grenda's Bus Services. It has since adopted the standard white with red and yellow flashes of Grenda Corporation.

== See also ==
- Buses in Melbourne
- List of Victorian Bus Companies
- List of Melbourne bus routes
