= Ivanhoe Bus Company =

Bus and coach operator in Melbourne, Australia

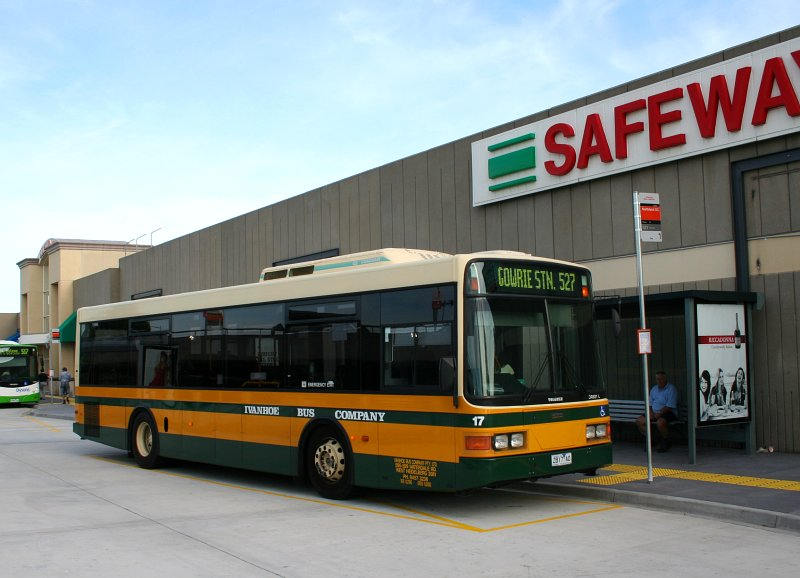
- Volgren bodied Metrotech Delta 250 at Northland Shopping Centre in February 2008
- Commenced operation: 16 August 1956
- Ceased operation: 30 June 2010
- Headquarters: Heidelberg West
- Service area: North-Eastern Melbourne
- Service type: Bus operator
- Routes: 6
- Hubs: La Trobe University; Northland Shopping Centre
- Fleet: 29 (June 2010)
- Website: www.buslines.com.au/ivanhoe

Ivanhoe Bus Company was a bus operator in Melbourne, Australia. As a Melbourne bus company, it operated six bus routes under contract to the Government of Victoria. It was purchased by Ventura Bus Lines in June 2010.

== History ==
In May 1952 Claude Moriarty and William Molan purchased Heidelberg Motor Omnibus Company from Gordon Brown renaming the operation Ivanhoe Bus Company. In June 2010 the business was sold to Ventura Bus Lines.

== Fleet ==
As at June 2010 the fleet consisted of 29 buses. Fleet livery was yellow with a green stripe.
