= Moorabbin Transit =

Australian bus company

- Parent: Grenda Corporation
- Founded: July 1988
- Ceased operation: January 2012
- Headquarters: Cheltenham
- Service area: South Eastern Melbourne
- Service type: Bus operator
- Routes: 11
- Hubs: Chadstone Shopping Centre; Southland Shopping Centre
- Stations: Carrum; Cheltenham; Clayton; Dandenong; Mentone; Moorabbin; Mordialloc; Springvale
- Fleet: 83 (March 2014)
- Chief executive: Andrew Cornwall
- Website: www.venturabus.com.au

Moorabbin Transit was a bus operator in Melbourne, Australia. As a Melbourne bus company, it operated 11 bus routes under contract to the Government of Victoria. A subsidiary of Grenda Corporation, it was purchased by Ventura Bus Lines in January 2012.

== History ==
Moorabbin Transit was formed in July 1988 when Grenda Corporation purchased Blue & Silver Bus Lines, Camden Bus Lines, Hampton Green, Hampton Red, and Southland Bus Service. Sandringham Bus Co was added in December 1988.

Moorabbin Transit was included in the sale of Grenda Corporation to Ventura Bus Lines in November 2011 and the brand was retired.

== Fleet ==
As at March 2014 the fleet consists of 83 buses. Moorabbin Transit original livery was the cream and three stripes of Grenda's Bus Services, but with the red stripes painted green. It has since adopted the standard white with red and yellow flashes of Grenda Corporation.

== See also ==
- Buses in Melbourne
- List of Victorian Bus Companies
- List of Melbourne bus routes
