= US Bus Lines =

- Commenced operation: 1921
- Headquarters: Monbulk
- Service area: Eastern Melbourne
- Service type: Bus operator
- Routes: 6
- Fleet: 56 (May 2014)
- Website: www.usbus.com.au

US Bus Lines was a bus and coach operator in Melbourne, Victoria, Australia. It was a Melbourne bus company that operated six bus routes under contract to Public Transport Victoria. It was acquired by Ventura Bus Lines in December 2009.

== History ==
In 1921 Belgrave United Motor Service was formed by Messrs Carter, Davies, Gayle and Hitchcock. The US Bus Lines was adopted later in the 1920s. The Olinda service was purchased from Tutt & Stone in 1925, and the Belgrave South service from W Parkin in April 1937. In May 1956 the Dandenong to Belgrave service was purchased from Dyson's Peninsula Motors and Panorama Bus Service from Mr Jewell in the early 1960s.

In February 1972 the business merged with Invicta Bus Service to form Invicta United Bus Lines, but this arrangement was dissolved in September 1973. In September 1981 US Bus Lines was purchased by G Pulitano. In December 2009 US Bus Lines was sold to Ventura Bus Lines.

== Fleet ==
As at May 2014 the fleet consisted of 56 buses. Fleet livery was white with red and blue stripes.
