= Peninsula Bus Lines =

Bus and coach operator in Australia

- Parent: Grenda Corporation
- Commenced operation: July 1950
- Ceased operation: January 2012
- Headquarters: Seaford
- Service area: South Eastern Melbourne
- Service type: Bus & coach operator
- Routes: 18
- Hubs: Centro Karingal
- Fleet: 106 (May 2014)
- Website: www.grenda.com.au

Peninsula Bus Lines was a bus and coach operator in Melbourne, Australia. As a Melbourne bus company, it operated 18 bus routes under contract to the Government of Victoria. A subsidiary of Grenda Corporation, it was purchased by Ventura Bus Lines in January 2012.

== History ==
Peninsula Bus Lines was formed in July 1950 when Dysons Peninsula Motors was purchased followed by some services from Woods Bus Services. In 1975 Peninsula Bus Lines was purchased by Grenda Corporation. In October 2002, Frankston Passenger Service was purchased and amalgamated with Peninsula Bus Lines. In January 2012, it was included in the sale of Grenda Corporation to Ventura Bus Lines and the brand was retired.

== Fleet ==
As at May 2014 the fleet consisted of 106 buses and coaches. Peninsula Bus Lines adopted the cream and three stripes livery of Grenda's Bus Services, but with the red stripes painted blue. It later adopted the standard white with red and yellow flashes of Grenda Corporation.
