= Invicta Bus Services =

Bus operator in Melbourne, Australia

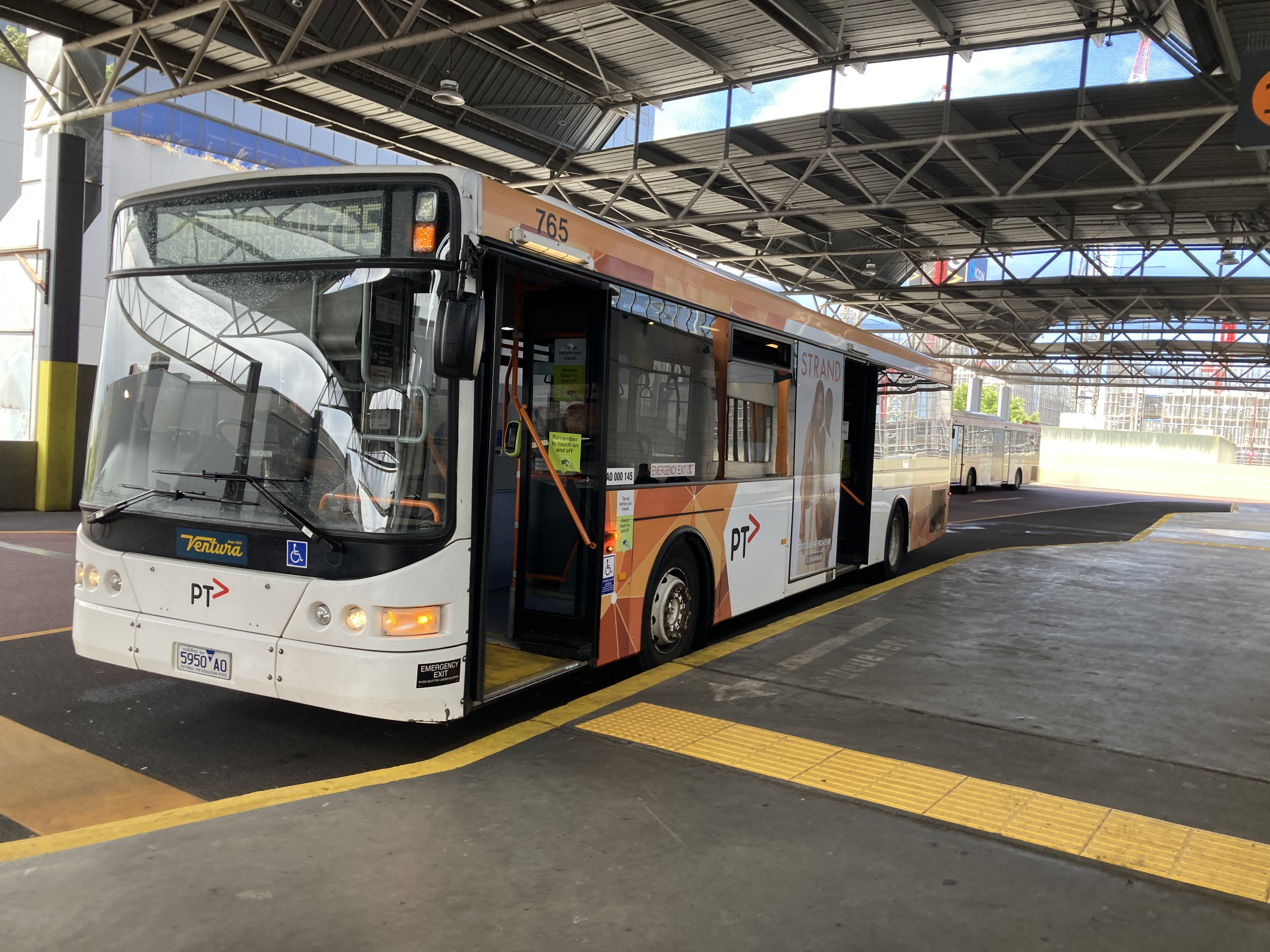
- A former Invicta bus, since operated by Ventura Bus Lines, November 2024
- Parent: Grenda Corporation
- Commenced operation: 24 May 1936
- Ceased operation: January 2012
- Headquarters: Lilydale
- Service area: Eastern Melbourne
- Service type: Bus operator
- Routes: 16
- Hubs: Chirnside Park Shopping Centre; Stud Park Shopping Centre; Waverley Gardens Shopping Centre; Westfield Knox
- Fleet: 97 (January 2012)
- Website: www.invictabus.com.au

Invicta Bus Services, previously Croydon Bus Service trading as Invicta Bus Lines, was a bus and coach operator in Melbourne, Victoria, Australia. It operated 16 bus routes under contract to Public Transport Victoria. It was purchased by Grenda Corporation in March 2009, which in turn was acquired by Ventura Bus Lines in January 2012.

== History ==
The company logo used by Invicta between 2002 and 2009. It consists of three prancing horses similar to the Invicta flag, the namesake of the company.

Croydon Bus Service owned by Bill Wilson commenced on 24 May 1936 between Croydon and North Croydon. In December 1947, Clem and Emily (Tine) Usher purchased the business, which had a fleet of five vehicles at the time. The business expanded with the purchase of Ringwood Bus Service in May 1952, A Turner in 1968, Adams Bus Service in January 1979. John Usher joined the family business in 1964, and became managing direction in 1967. Clem died the year after in 1968, and by this time the business had 22 vehicles.

In February 1972, the business merged with US Bus Lines to form Invicta United Bus Lines, but this arrangement was dissolved in September 1973. In October 1977, Invcita introduced the Telebus on-demand bus service.

In July 1987, Invicta purchased Morse's Bus Service in Devonport, Tasmania. This was sold in 1990. Usher then acquired other bus services in Tasmania, such as Devonport to Cradle Mountain, Tag Along Tours in Hobart and Mountain Stage Line in Launceston. The Tasmanian operations then became known as Tassielink Transit.

In September 2001, John Usher sold Croydon Bus Service and its associated companies to its management team, consisting of Pam Usher, Frank Mercuri and Kumar Vasantha. John continued to focus on Tassielink Transit, which was separated from Invicta. Shortly after the sale (circa. 2002), the company logo was modified from one prancing horse to three prancing horses to reflect the three new directors.

Invicta was acquired by the Grenda Corporation in March 2009. The brand was retained with the use of Grenda's logo in lieu of the horses logo. After Grenda Corporation was purchased by Ventura Bus Lines in January 2012, the brand and logo were retired.

== Fleet ==
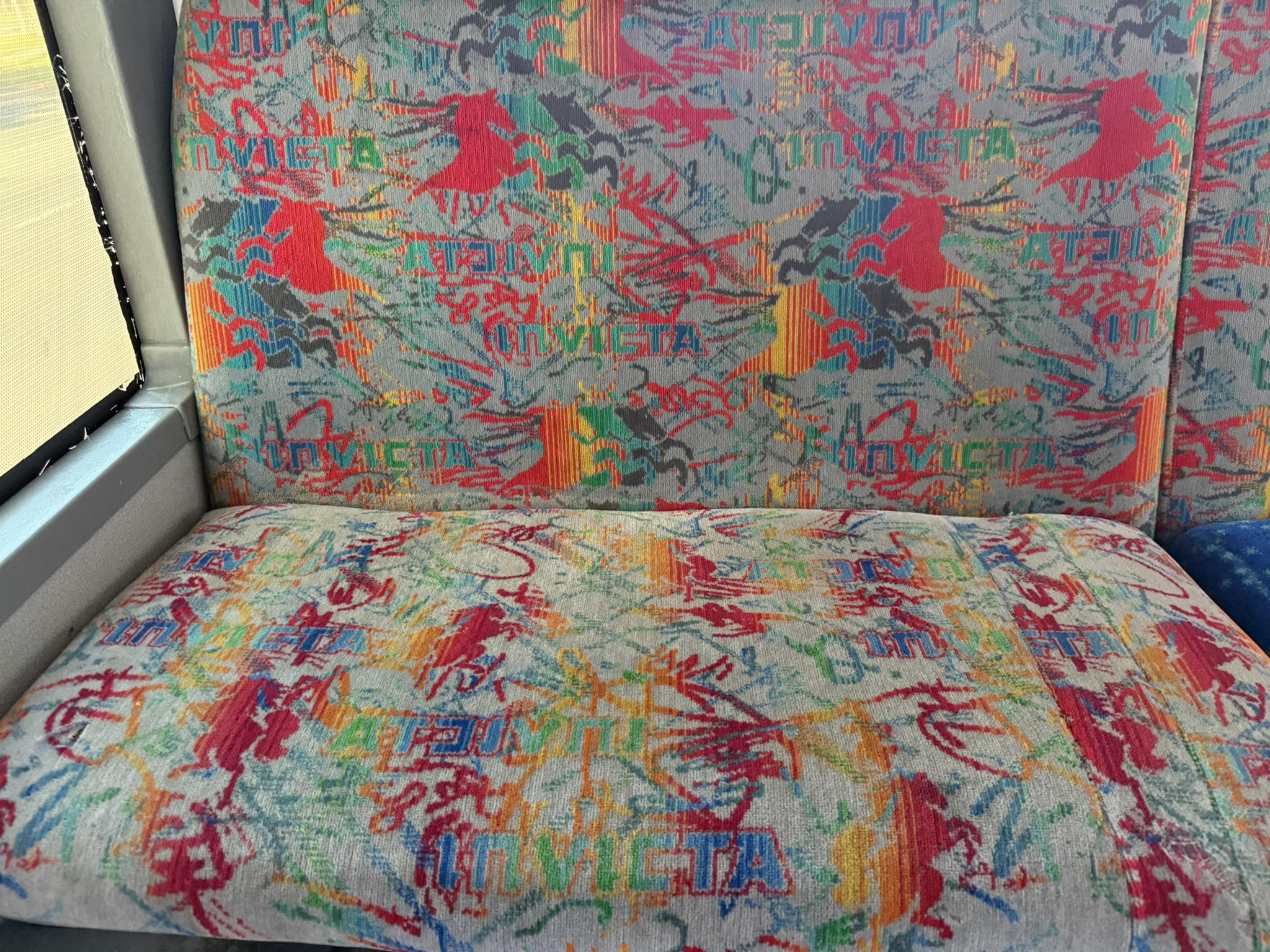
The seat cover inside a former Invicta bus, showing the name Invicta and the horses in Invicta's logo

As at the acquisition by Ventura (January 2012), the fleet consisted of 97 buses.

Fleet livery was fawn and orange that was later superseded by a white, yellow and red livery with the company logo's prancing horses (reminiscent of that on the Invicta flag). After its acquisition by Grenda, it later adopted the standard white with red and yellow flashes of Grenda Corporation.
