= Grenda Corporation =

Australian bus and coach company

- Founded: October 1945; 81 years ago
- Defunct: January 2012; 14 years ago
- Headquarters: Dandenong
- Service area: South-Eastern Melbourne
- Service type: Former bus & coach operator

Grenda Corporation was an Australian bus and coach company which operated services under its subsidiaries Cardinia Transit, Grenda's Bus Services, Moorabbin Transit, Peninsula Bus Lines and Portsea Passenger Service, all of which were sold to Ventura Bus Lines in January 2012. It also formerly owned the Volgren bus body building business.

== History ==
Grenda's Bus Services was founded in October 1945 when George Grenda purchased four routes from Shaves Bus Service in Dandenong.

Over the years a number of acquisitions were made:

- Dandenong Boomerang Bus Lines in July 1951
- Peninsula Bus Lines, Seaford in August 1958
- O Bridges in the early 1960s
- H Glenny in June 1965
- Blue Line Tourist Coaches, Sydney was purchased in 1973, sold along with Grenda's Melbourne coach operation to AAT Kings in 1975
- Portsea Passenger Service in February 1983
- Blue & Silver Bus Lines, Camden Bus Lines, Hampton Green, Hampton Red, Sandringham Bus Co & Southland Bus Service in 1988 to form Moorabbin Transit
- Berwick Bus Lines in June 1996, amalgamated with Grenda Bus Service's Pakenham depot to form Cardinia Transit
- Frankston Passenger Service in 2002, amalgamated with Peninsula Bus Lines
- Blue Ridge Coaches in January 2006, amalgamated with Peninsula Bus Lines
- Hastings Coaches in April 2008, amalgamated with Peninsula Bus Lines
- Invicta Bus Services, Lilydale in 2009

In 1977 bodybuilder Volgren was formed in Dandenong. Because Grenda held the Volvo Buses dealership in Victoria, only chassis from this manufacturer were bodied until 1989 when the dealership was relinquished.

In 1995 Grenda Corporation formed Australian Transit Enterprises, a joint venture with Hornibrook Bus Lines and Kefford Corporation that operates SouthLink in Adelaide and Path Transit in Perth.

In November 2011, it was announced that Grenda Transit (bus operations) would be purchased by Ventura Bus Lines. The purchase was finalised in January 2012. In December 2011, Volgren was sold to Brazilian bus manufacturer Marcopolo.

== See also ==
- Buses in Melbourne
- List of Victorian Bus Companies
- List of Melbourne bus routes
