= Grenda's Bus Services =

Australian bus and coach operator

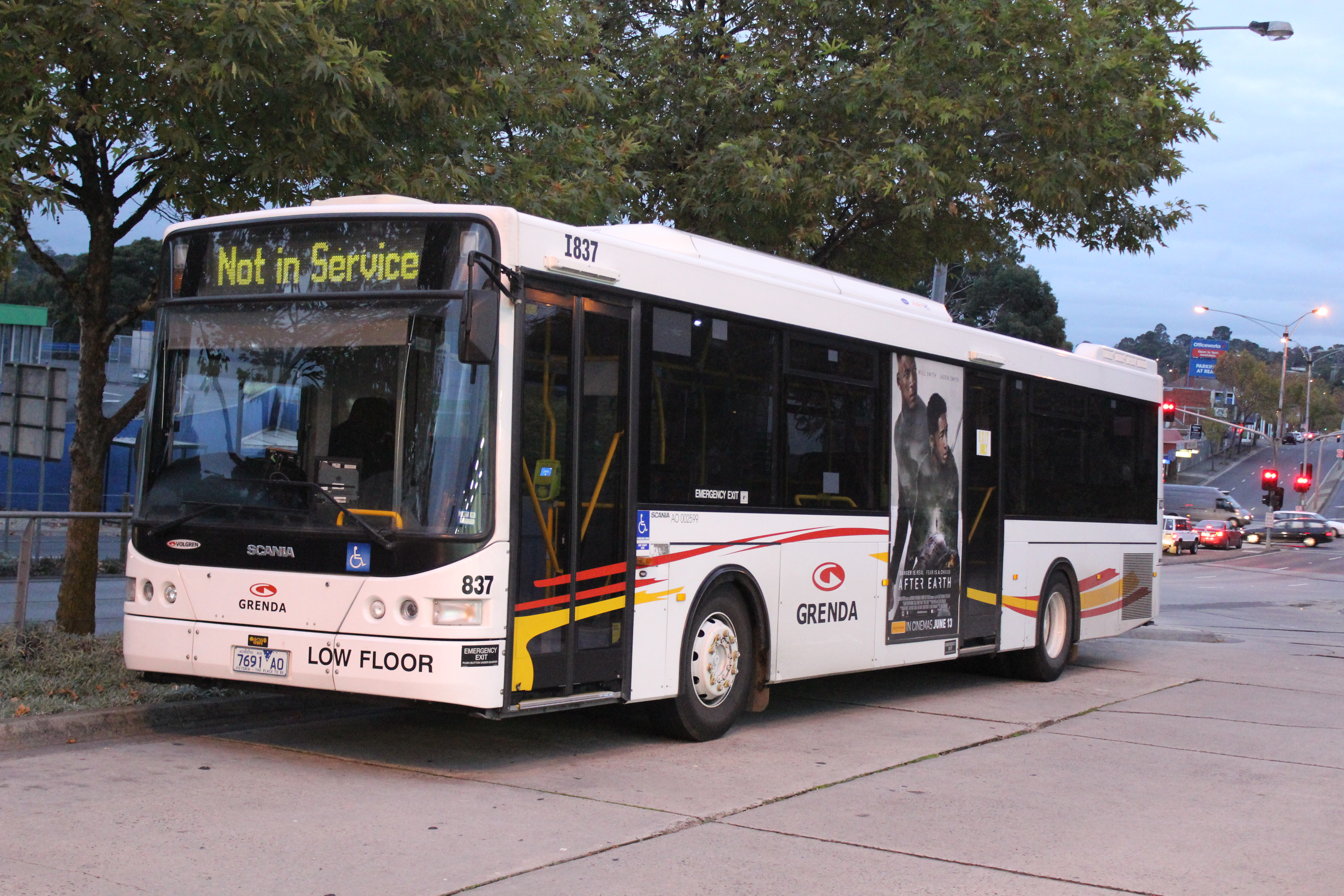
- Volgren bodied Scania K230UB at Ringwood in May 2013
- Commenced operation: October 1945
- Ceased operation: 22 January 2012
- Headquarters: Dandenong
- Service area: South-Eastern Melbourne
- Service type: Bus & coach operator
- Routes: 23
- Hubs: Chadstone Shopping Centre; Monash University; Parkmore Shopping Centre; Stud Park Shopping Centre; Waverley Gardens Shopping Centre; Westfield Southland; Westfield Fountain Gate
- Fleet: 181 (May 2014)

Grenda's Bus Services was a bus and coach operator in Melbourne, Australia. As a Melbourne bus company, it operated 23 bus routes under contract to the Victoria State Government. It was purchased by Ventura Bus Lines in January 2012.

== History ==
Grenda's Bus Services was founded in October 1945 when George Grenda purchased four routes from Shaves Bus Service in Dandenong. After being based in Foster Street, Dandenong for 50 years, it moved to a new depot in Cheltenham Road in 2008. In January 2012, it was included in the sale of parent company Grenda Corporation to Ventura Bus Lines.

== Fleet ==
As at May 2014 the fleet consisted of 181 buses and coaches. Grenda's Bus Services had a livery of cream with red stripes. It later adopted the standard white with red and yellow flashes of Grenda Corporation.
