= Volgren =

Australian bus manufacturer

Volgren Australia
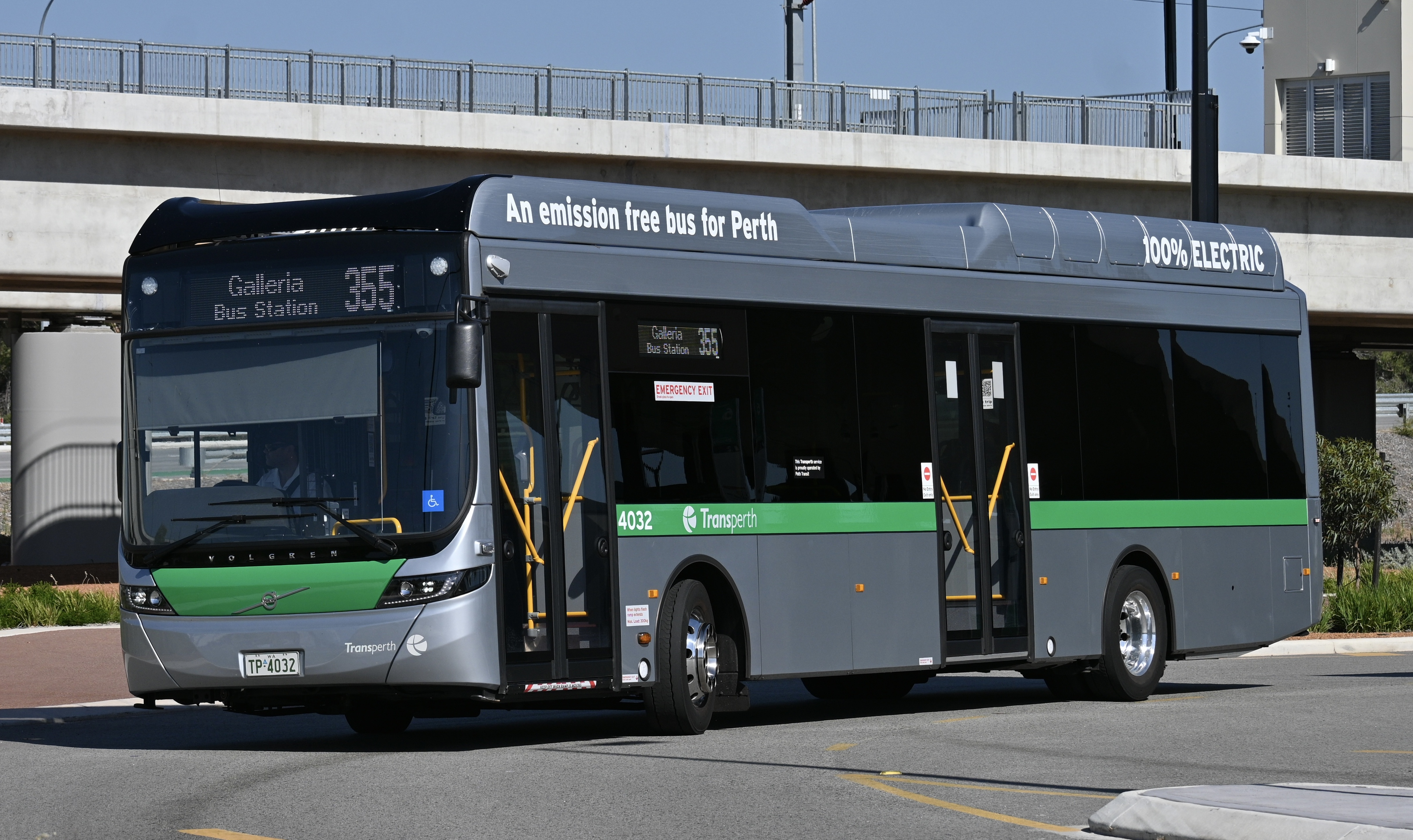
- A Transperth Volvo BZL with Volgren Optimus bodywork leaving Whiteman Park railway station in January 2026.
- Type: Subsidiary
- Industry: Bus manufacturing
- Founded: 1977; 49 years ago
- Headquarters: Dandenong
- Number of locations: Dandenong; Malaga; Eagle Farm
- Key people: Thiago Deiro (CEO)
- Revenue: $207.1 million (June 2011)
- Number of employees: 560 (June 2011)
- Parent: Marcopolo
- Website: www.volgren.com.au

Volgren is an Australian bus and coach body manufacturer.

== History ==
Volgren was formed in 1977 by Melbourne bus operator Grenda Corporation in Dandenong, Victoria. Because Grenda held the Volvo Buses dealership in Victoria, only chassis from this manufacturer were bodied until 1989 when the dealership was relinquished.

The name is a portmanteau of the two original investors, Volvo and Grenda.

In 1981, a plant was established in Acacia Ridge, Queensland by Grenda Corporation, Hornibrook Bus Lines's Geoff Mountjoy, Greyhound Northern and Stateliner. It bodied some Volvo B59 and B10Rs for Hornibrook Bus Lines and Surfside Buslines before concentrating on Twin and Double Deck Volvo B10M coaches. This closed in the late 1980s.

In December 2011, Brazilian bus manufacturer Marcopolo acquired a 75% shareholding. In April 2014 this was increased to 100%.

== Manufacturing facilities ==
Current factories:

- Dandenong, Victoria (VG) completed Volgren's first bus in October 1979
- Malaga, Western Australia (VP) opened in April 1999 to fulfill a contract to body Mercedes-Benz O405NHs for Transperth
- Eagle Farm, Queensland (VQ) opened in February 2010

Former factories:

- Tomago, New South Wales (VT) opened in March 2010, closed July 2012

== Products ==
=== City Buses ===
- Optimus
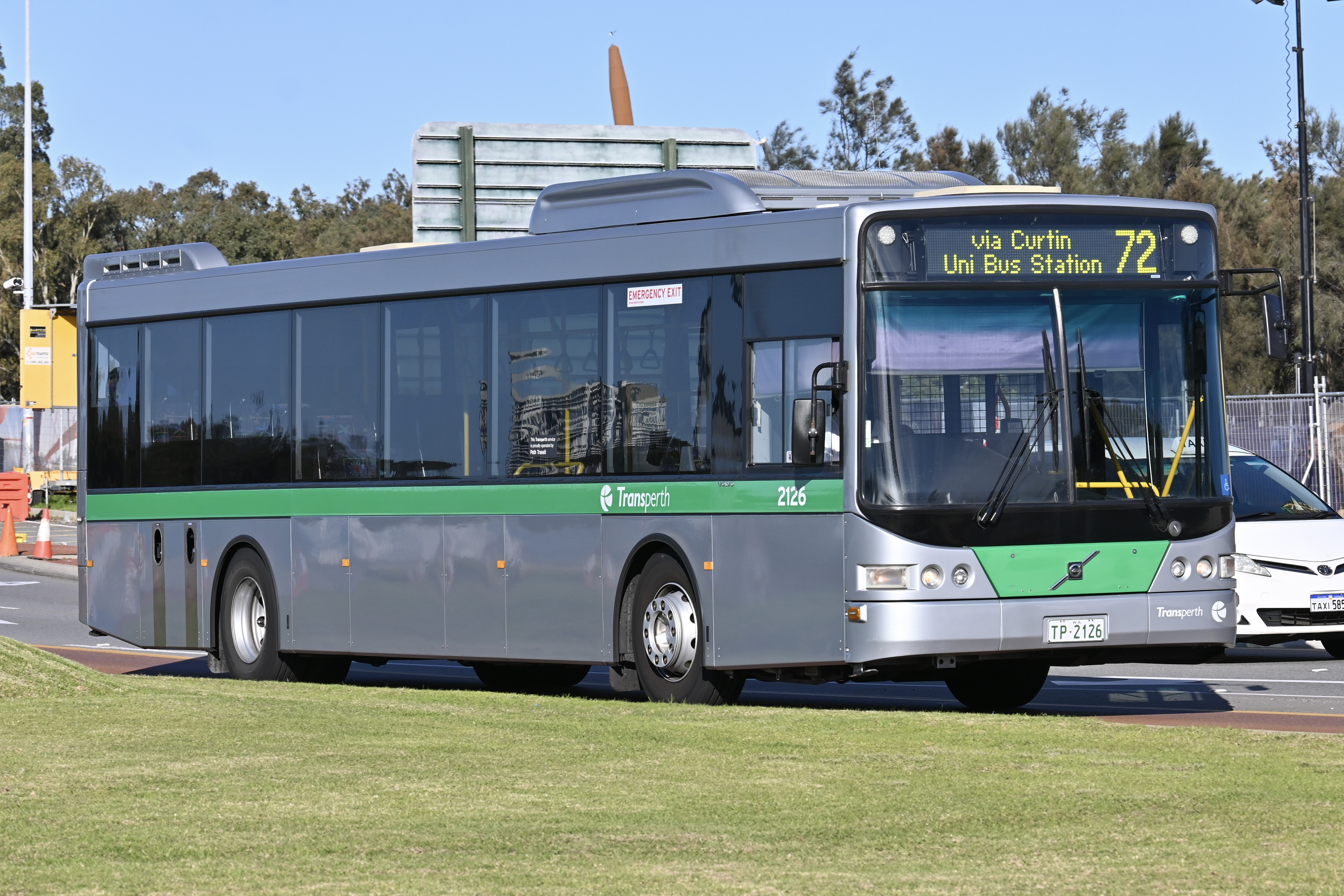
- An example of CR228L bodywork on a Volvo B7RLE chassis operated by Transperth.
  CR228L
- CR227L
- CR226L
- CR225L
- CR224L
- CR223L
- CR222L
- CR221L

=== Coaches ===
- Endura
- SC222
- SC221

== Operators ==
Volgren have bodied a number of buses for Asian and Australian operators: Australia

- ComfortDelGro Australia
- Transdev Australasia
- Ventura Bus Lines
- Transperth
- Kinetic Group
- Transport Canberra & City Services

Asia

- Hong Kong
  - Kowloon Motor Bus formerly operated 1 Volvo B9TL, 17 MAN 24.310 HOCLNR-NLs and 21 Volvo Super Olympians.
  - Citybus formerly operated 1 MAN 24.350 HOCLNR-NL and 1 Scania K94UB
- Singapore
  - SBS Transit formerly operated 50 Volvo Super Olympians, a diesel powered Volvo B10BLE, a Scania L94UB, a Volvo Super Olympian prototype, a Mercedes-Benz O405G prototype, a Volvo B5RLEH and 12 CNG-powered Volvo B10BLEs.
  - SMRT Buses formerly operated 15 Mercedes-Benz O405s, 11 Hino HS3KRKKs and a HS3KRKA, 2 Dennis Lances and 21 Mercedes-Benz O405Gs.
- Malaysia, a substantial number of buses were fitted with the Volgren bodywork as well. Examples can be found in the capital Kuala Lumpur, Shah Alam and Johor Bahru, state capital of Johor.
- Japan
  - Nishi-Nippon Railroad bus, Toei Bus, Niigata Kotsu and Nara Kotsu currently operates Scania K360UA6×2/2LB with Optimus body. The body of these buses is 5 centimeters narrower than normal ones.

== Gallery ==
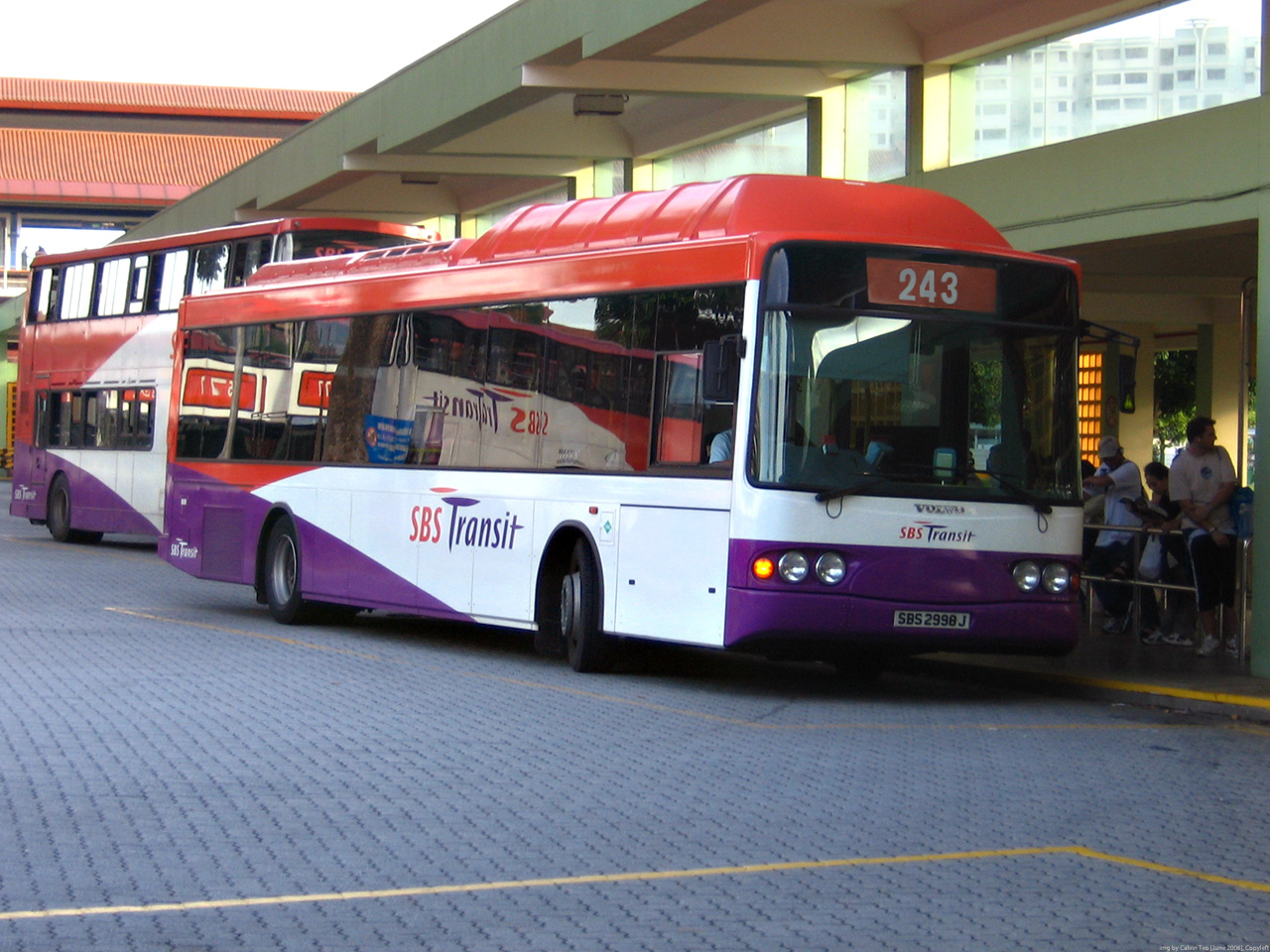
SBS Transit CNG powered Volvo B10BLE with Volgren CR222L bodywork

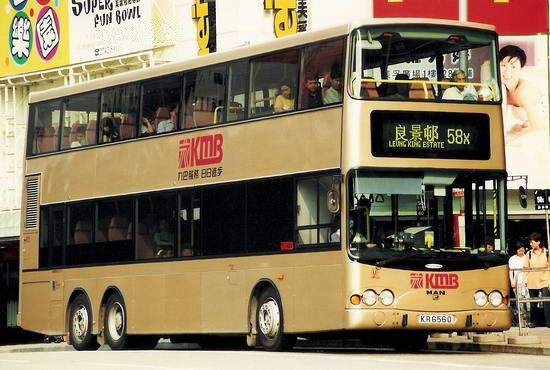
Kowloon Motor Bus MAN 24.310 with Volgren CR223LD bodywork

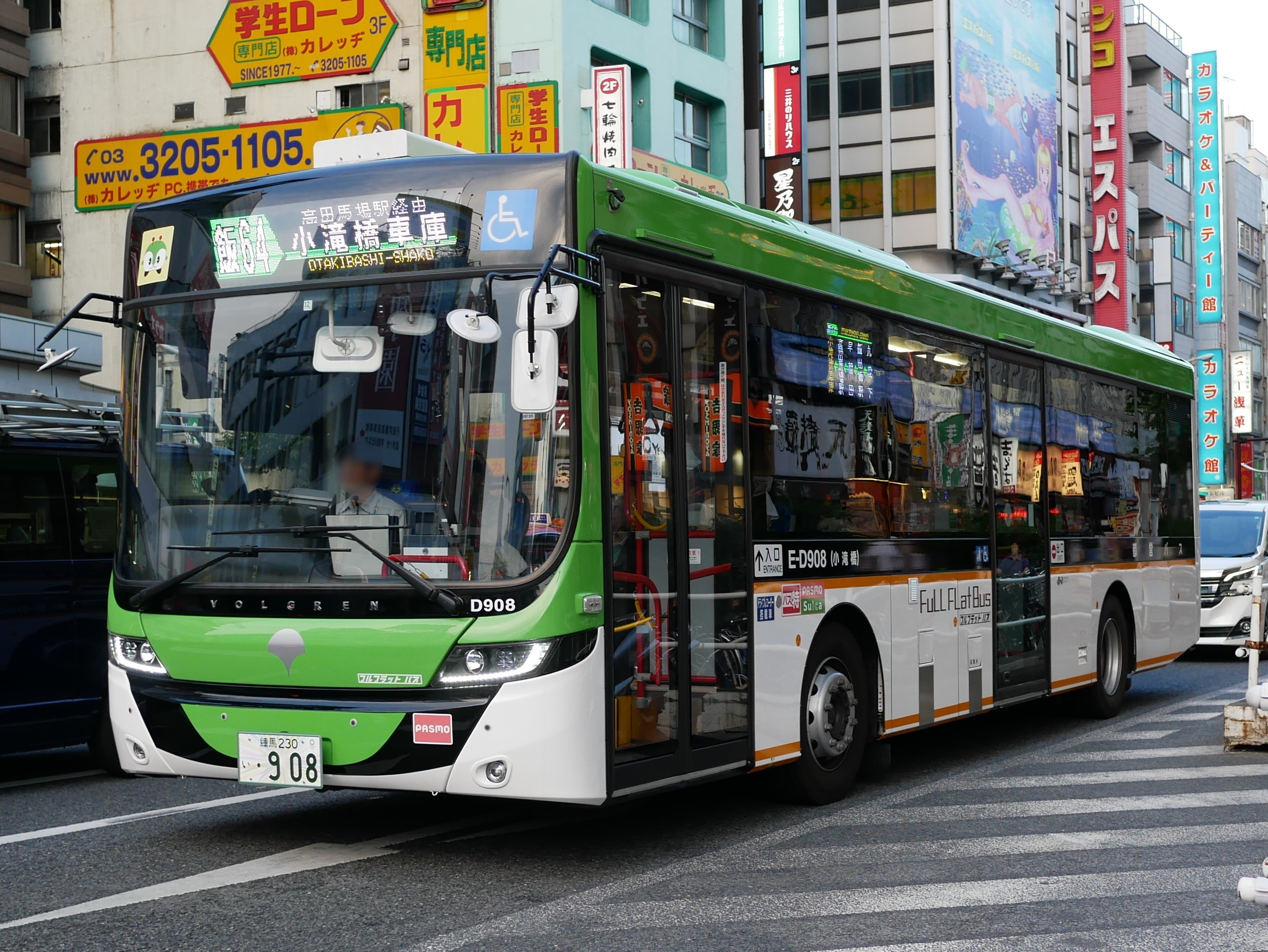
Toei Bus Scania N280UB with Volgren Optimus bodywork

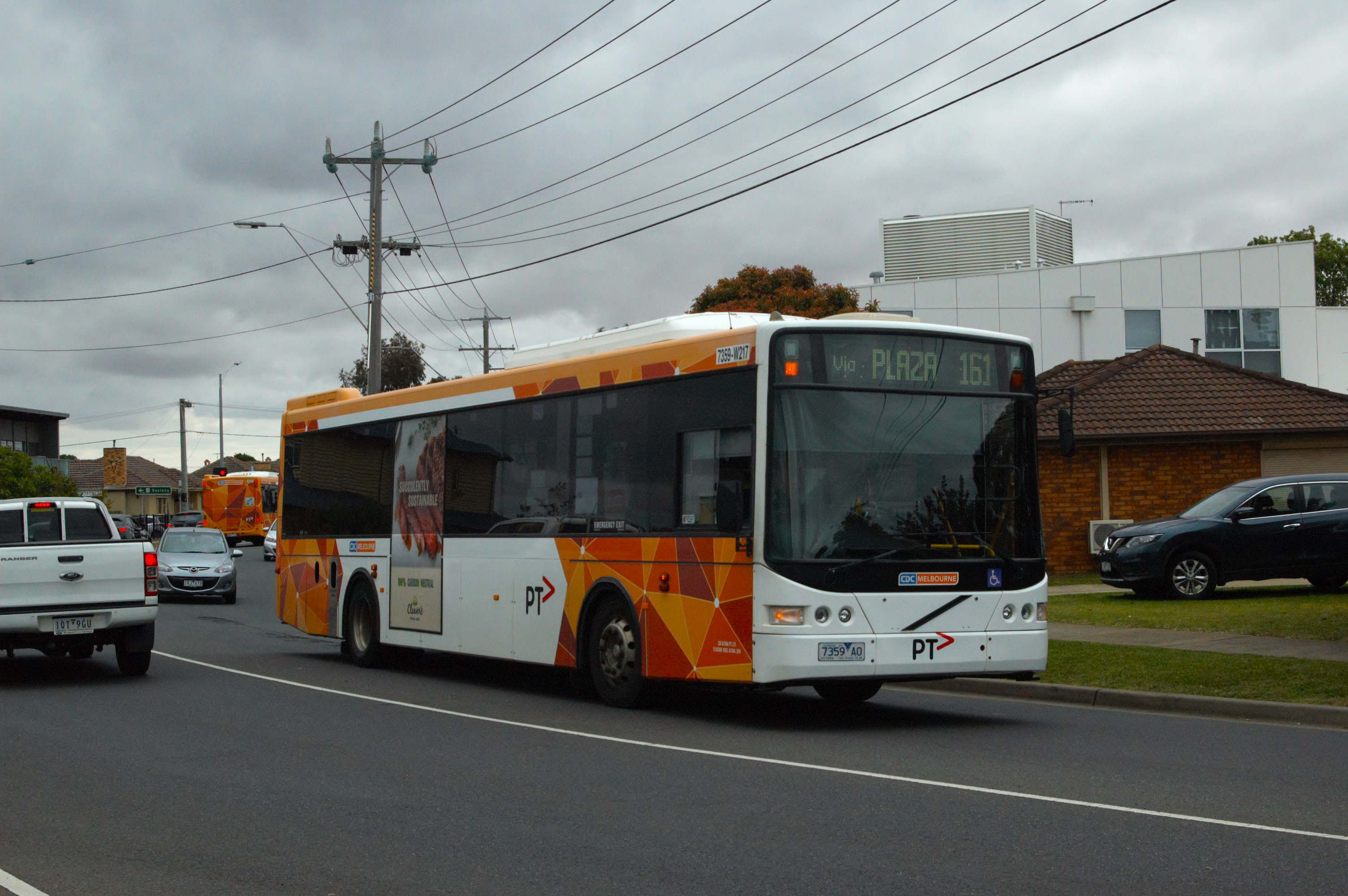
CDC Melbourne Volvo B7RLE with Volgren CR228L bodywork

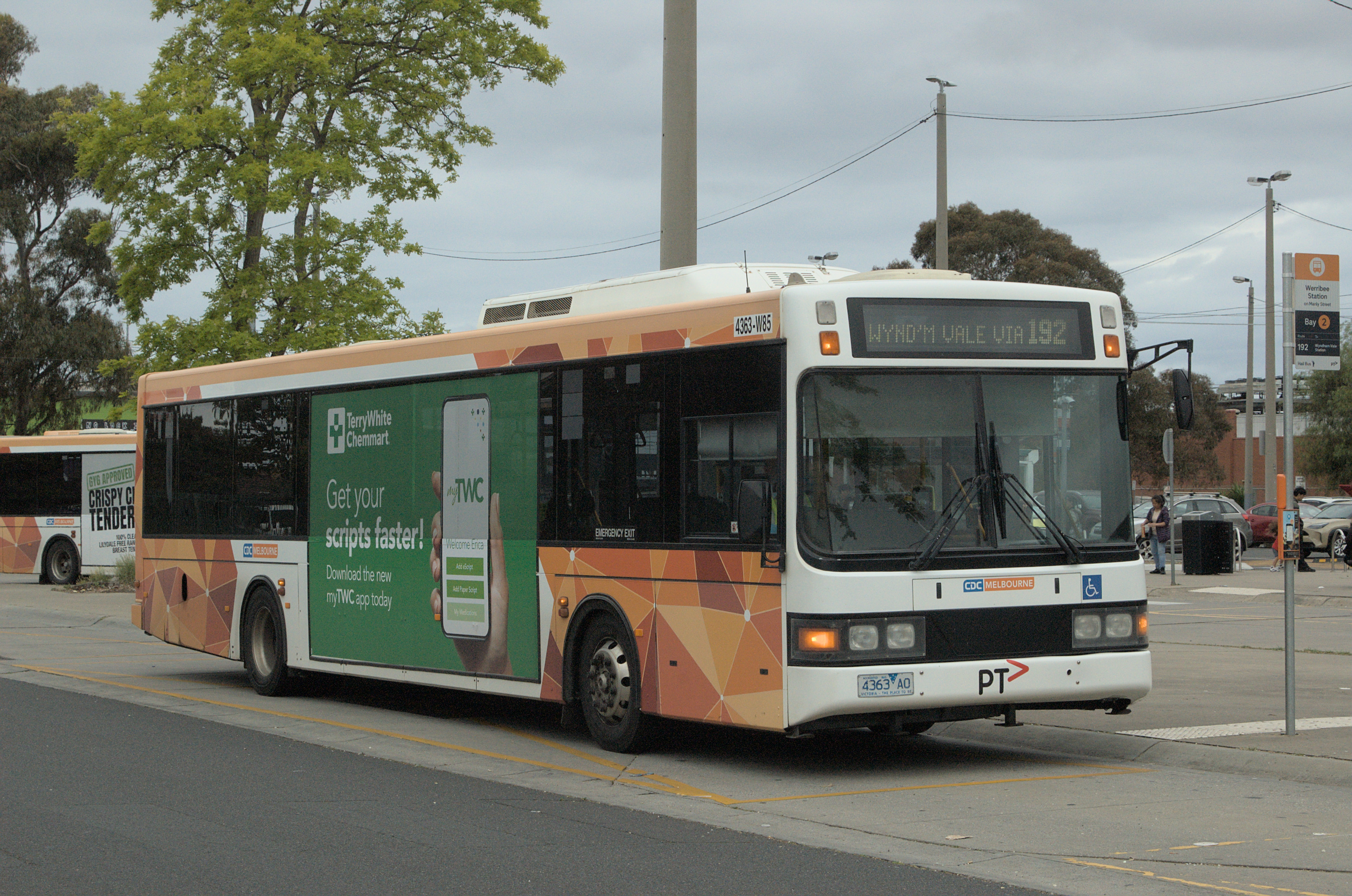
CDC Melbourne Volvo B7L with Volgren CR221L bodywork

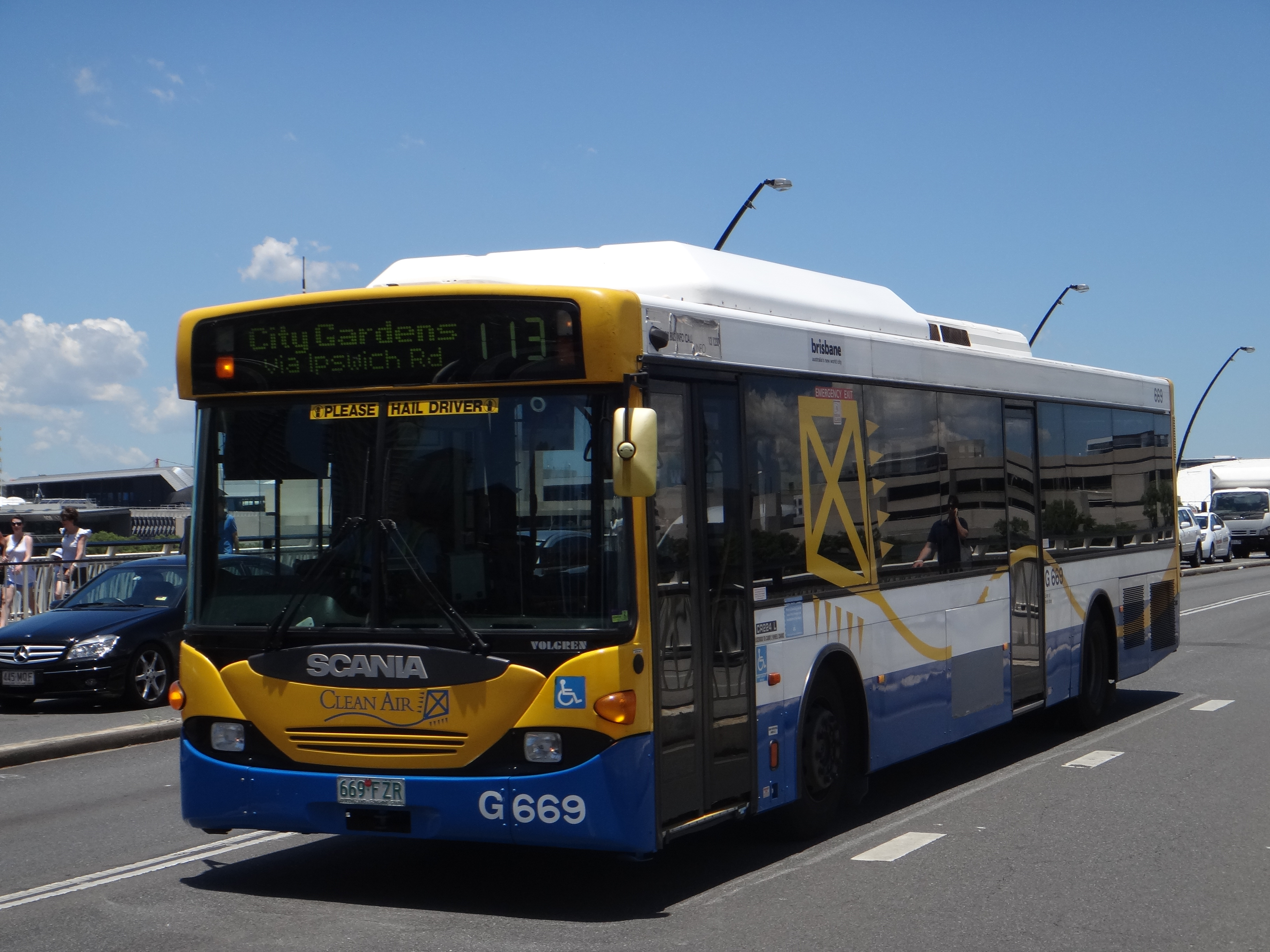
Brisbane Transport Scania L94UB CNG with Volgren CR224L bodywork

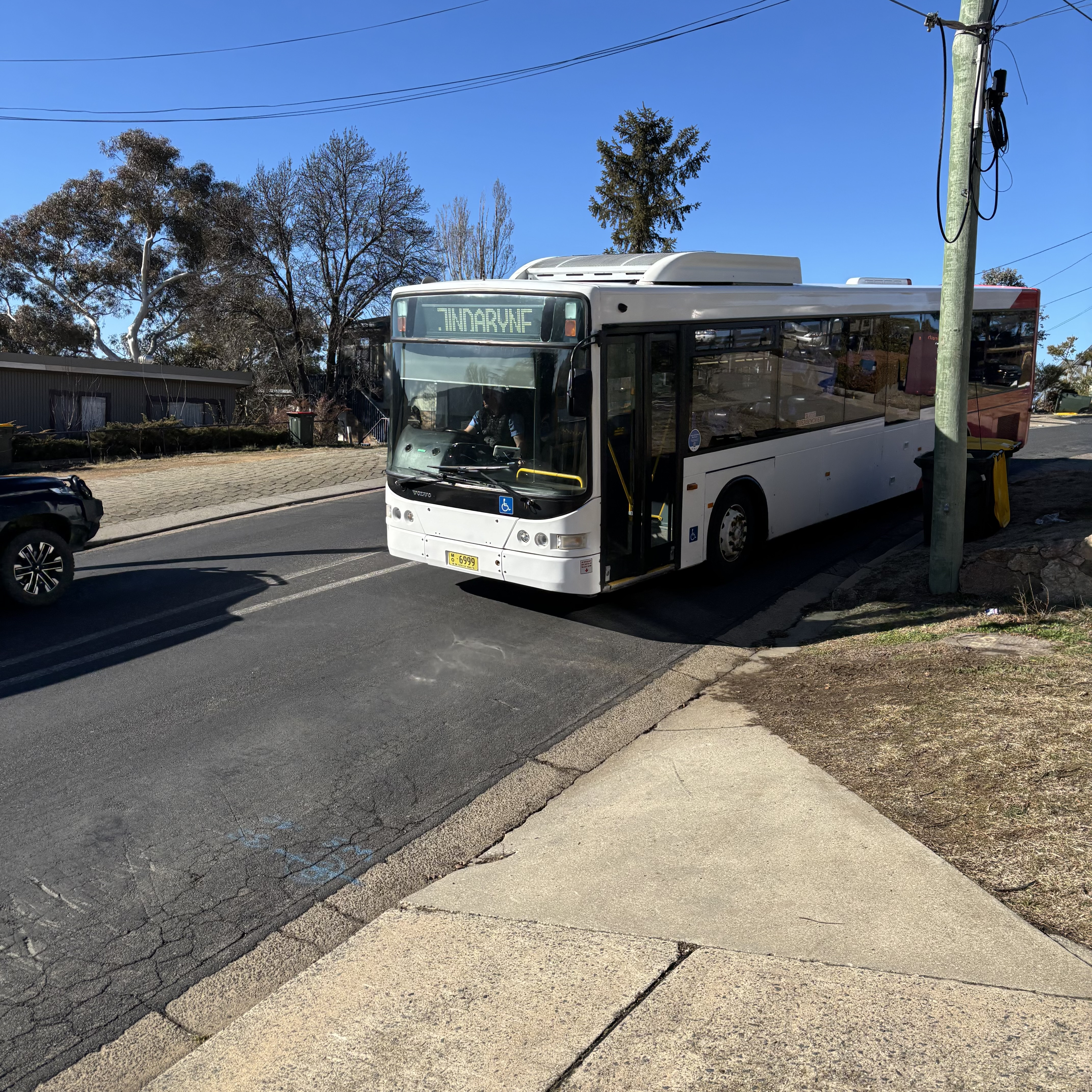
a Cooma coaches Volvo B7RLE with a Volgren CR228L bodywork
