= Ventura Bus Lines =

Bus company in Melbourne, Australia

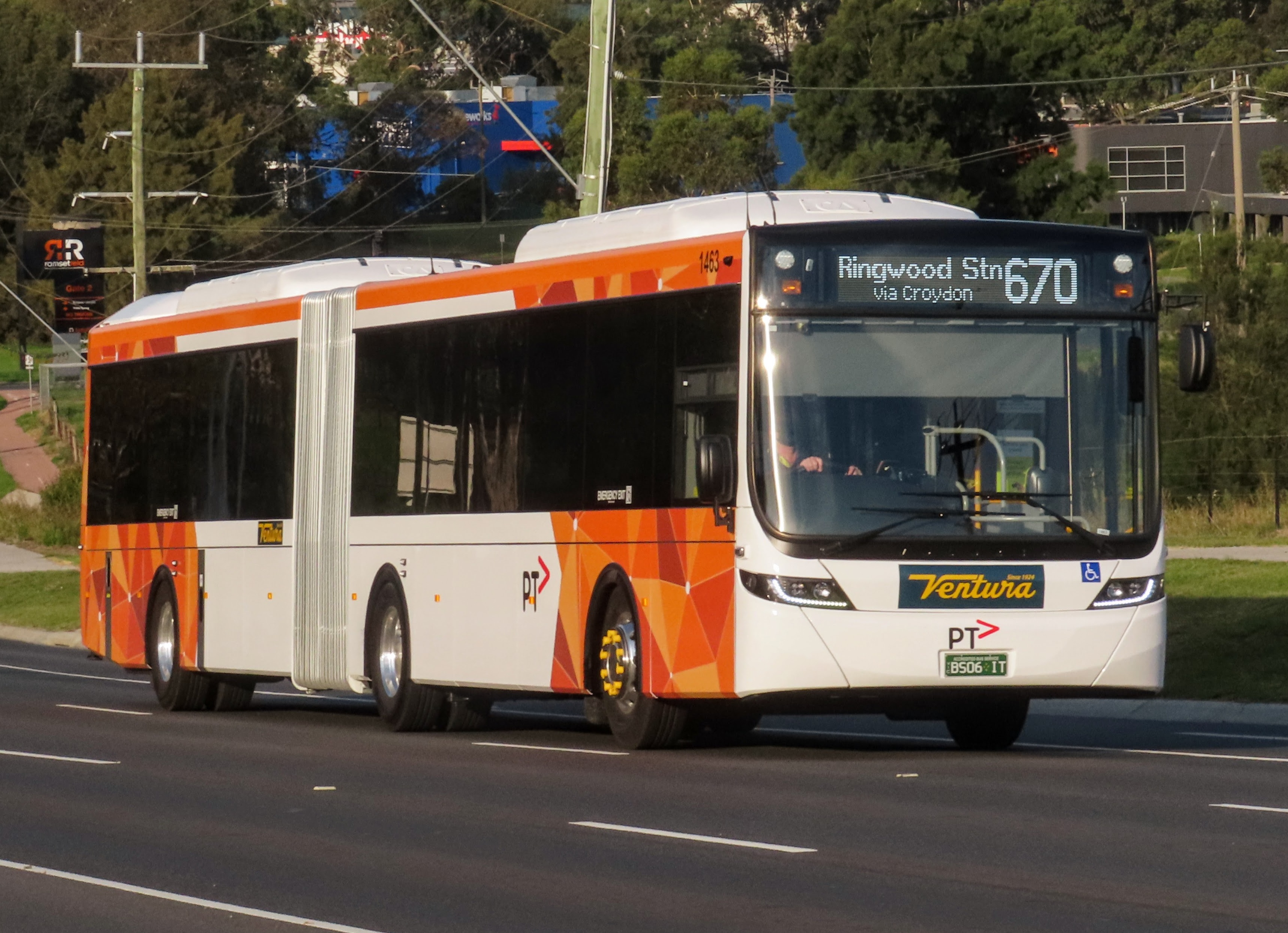
- Volgren bodied Scania K360UA in February 2021
- Parent: Keppel Infrastructure Trust (97.68%)
- Commenced operation: December 1924
- Headquarters: Dandenong
- Locale: Melbourne
- Service type: Bus & coach operator = Charter and track
- Routes: 135
- Depots: Croydon; Dandenong; Ivanhoe; Monbulk; Knoxfield; Oakleigh; Lilydale; Moorabbin; Pakenham; Hastings; Capel Sound; Seaford
- Fleet: 961 (May 2025)
- Website: www.venturabus.com.au

Ventura Bus Lines is a large bus and coach operator in Melbourne, Victoria, Australia, operating a fleet of more than 950 buses on 141 bus routes.

== History ==
=== Early history ===
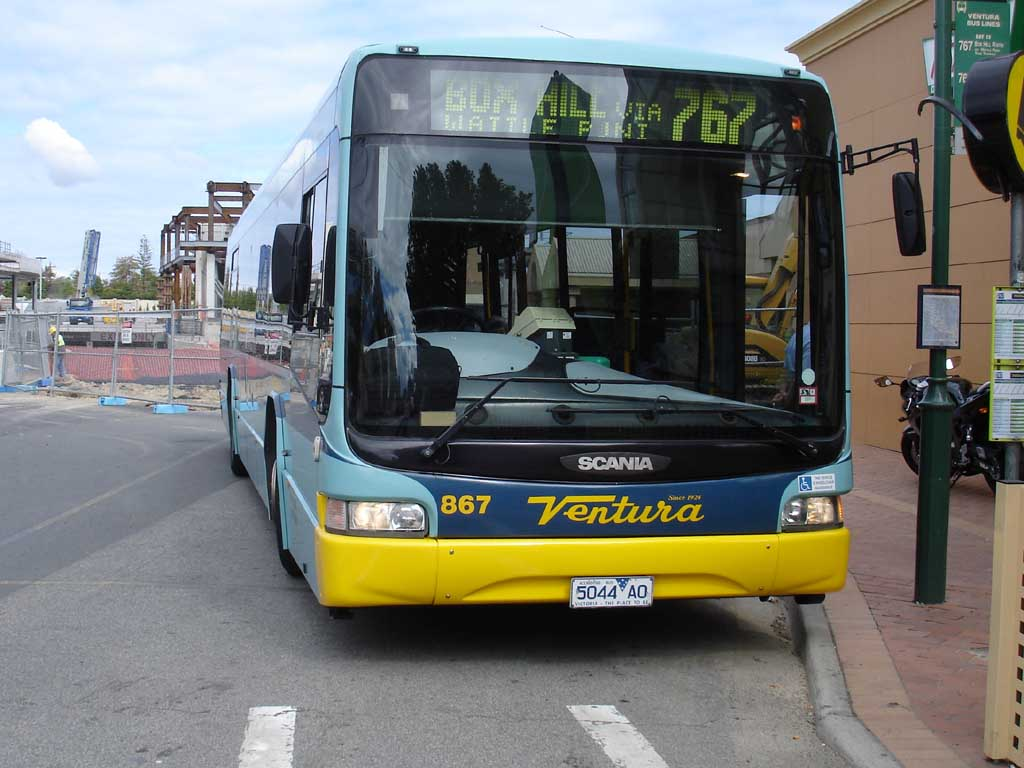
Northcoast Bus & Coach bodied Scania L94UB at Chadstone Shopping Centre in April 2008

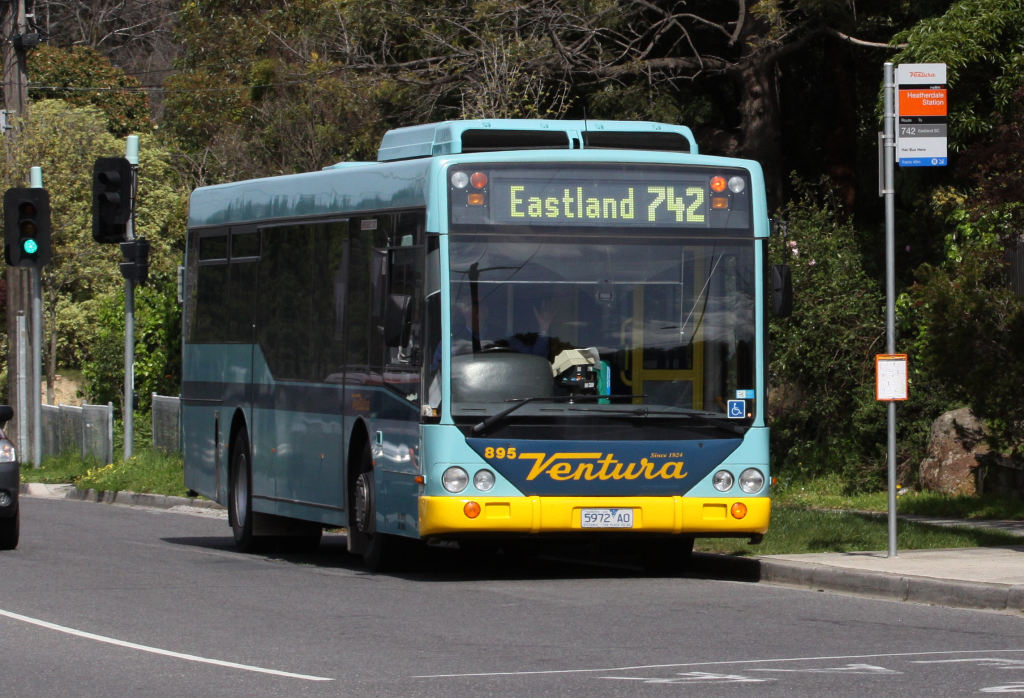
Custom Coaches bodied Scania L94UB at Heatherdale in September 2009

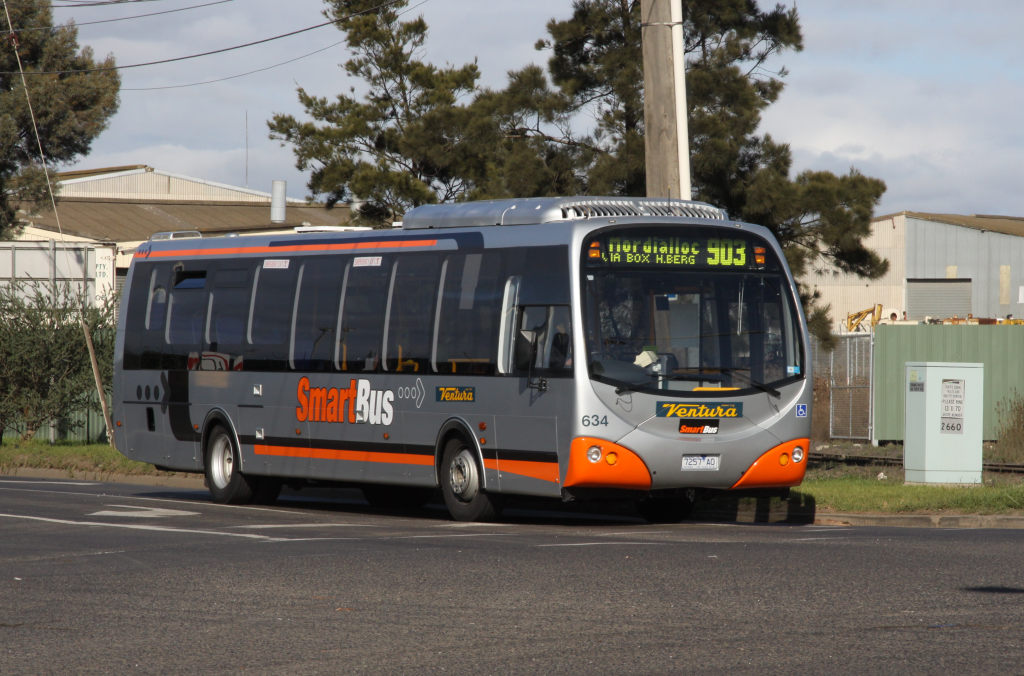
DesignLine bodied MAN 16.240 in SmartBus livery in August 2009

Ventura was founded in December 1924 by Henry Cornwall. The name and company colours (dark blue, light blue and yellow) derived from Ventura County, California where Cornwall had spent time after serving in World War I. A former employee of Track & Kintrack, St Kilda, Harry decided to form his own bus company when his employer refused to run a bus service along dirt roads through what was then Melbourne's outer east.

Cornwall began operating a bus route between Box Hill and Melbourne central business district, and in 1930 began running buses between Box Hill and Mentone. The first depot was behind the petrol station on the corner of Station Street and Canterbury Road, in Box Hill South.

=== Expansion ===
In 1943, the Aspendale to Mordialloc service was acquired. In the late 1940s this was extended from Mordialloc to Mentone and in 1951 from Aspendale to Chelsea. Following the opening of Chadstone Shopping Centre in 1960 services from Burwood and South Oakleigh were added.

In the 1950s and 1960s, a number of operations were purchased:

- Knibbs Bus Service with routes 225A Box Hill to Ferntree Gully and 226A Box Hill to Burwood in June 1954
- Box Hill Bus Lines with the Box Hill to Forest Hill service in February 1957
- Clarinda Transport with the Oakleigh to Glen Waverley service in May 1958
- High Street Road Bus Service from Reg Carter with the Glen Waverley to Glen Iris service in April 1968

In 1957, a new depot was opened on the corner of Centre and Warrigal Roads, Oakleigh. This was followed in the mid-1960s by a depot on Mahoneys Road, Burwood East to replace the original Box Hill depot. In 1969 the Mitcham routes of C Young were purchased followed in September 1970 by Boronia Bus Lines from Don Nugent with 12 routes.

In April 1987, Ventura acquired Bentleigh Bus Lines with three routes, and in December 1987 Hawthorn Bus Services, Rennies Bus Services, and Willis Bus Services all from Vic Haoust. As a result of these purchases, it built a new depot at Knoxfield to replace Burwood East.

=== Further growth ===
In 2000, Ventura introduced the first Australian buses to run on ethanol fuel. In February 2000, Ventura purchased Mount Dandenong Passenger Service from the Frazer family.

On 5 August 2002, the State Government introduced the first SmartBus service (as a trial project) run by Ventura that replaced the old timetable of the 703 Middle Brighton station to Blackburn station with a new, high frequency service on route 703. Due to the success of the initial SmartBus trial (patronage increased by up to 25%), the State Government introduced another service that Ventura operated, the former route 700 from Box Hill station to Mordialloc station via Warrigal Road. This was upgraded in April 2009 to the Red Orbital 903 service from Altona station to Mordialloc station via Sunshine, Essendon, Preston, Heidelberg, Doncaster, Chadstone and Warrigal Road.

In 2004 it purchased National Bus Company from National Express becoming the largest private bus operator in Melbourne. In December 2009, Ventura purchased US Bus Lines from the Pulitano Group, operating route services in the outer east region. In July 2010, Ventura acquired Ivanhoe Bus Company, operating in the north and north east region.

In January 2012, Ventura purchased Grenda Transit from Grenda Corporation, which consisted of Cardinia Transit, Grenda's Bus Services, Moorabbin Transit, Peninsula Bus Lines and Portsea Passenger Service, as well as the operations of Smartbus routes 900 to 902. As part of the financing of the deal a 15% stake in Ventura was sold to the Intermediate Capital Group.

In August 2013, as the result of the re-tendering of a number of Melbourne bus routes, the operation of SmartBus route 901 to 903, the National Bus Company operations (the Doncaster and Fitzroy North depots, including Smartbus routes 905 to 908), were transferred to Transdev Melbourne, along with 346 buses.

In February 2024, it was announced that Singapore-based Keppel Infrastructure Trust would acquire 97.68% of the business. As part of the purchase, Managing Director Andrew Cornwall will remain as its CEO, while retaining the remaining stake of the business. The acquisition was completed in June 2024.

== Fleet ==
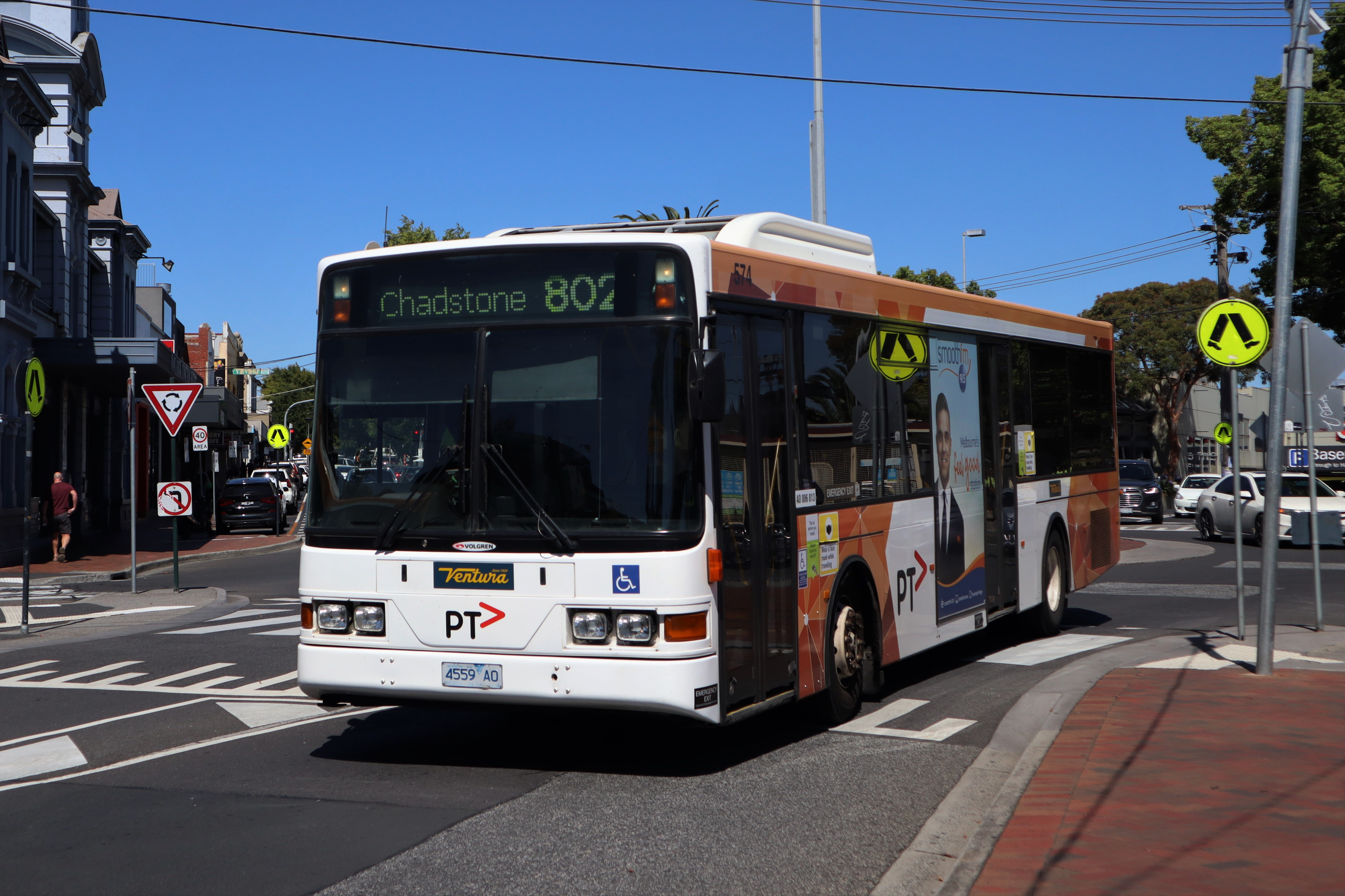
Volgren bodied Volvo B12BLE at Oakleigh railway station in January 2022

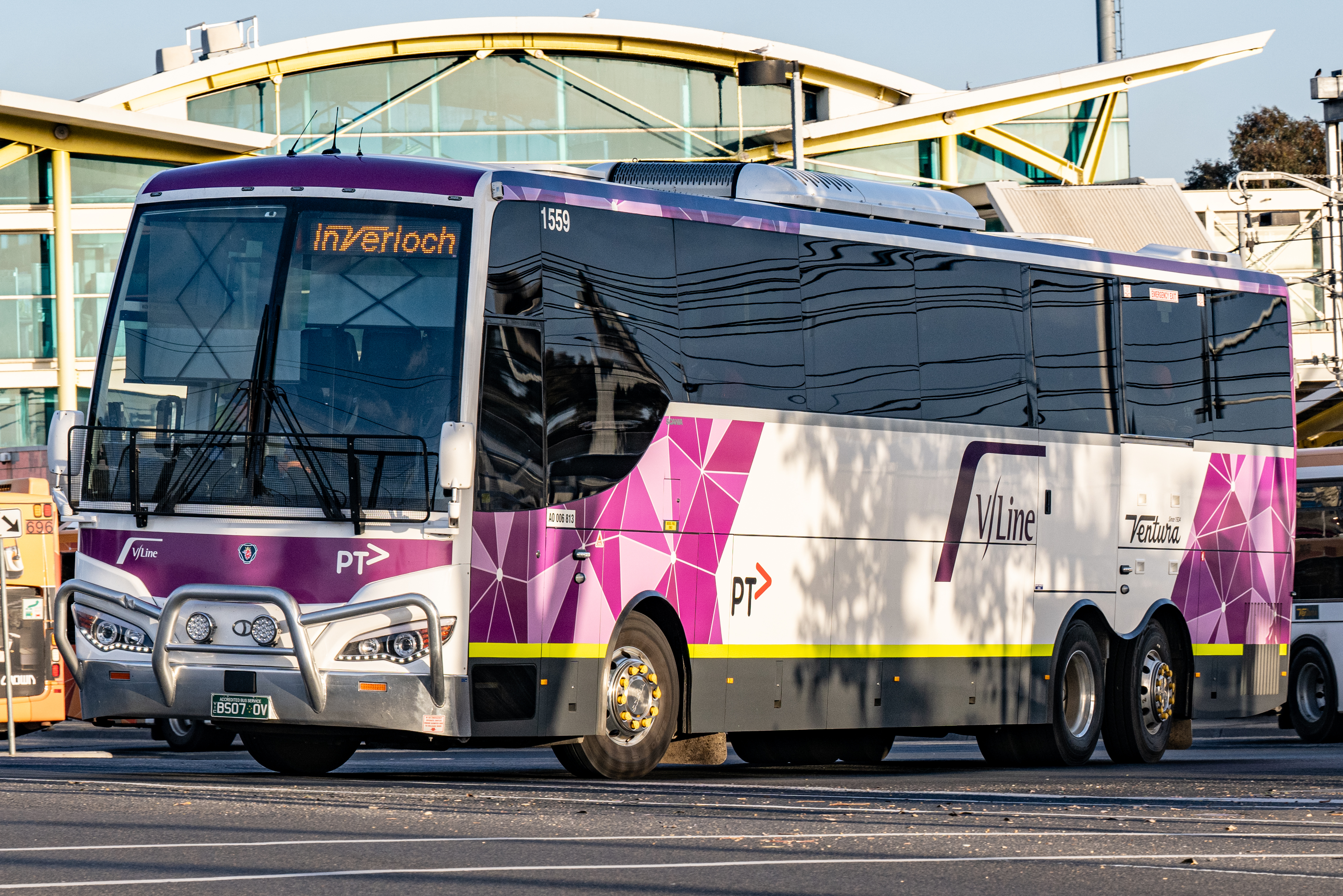
V/Line liveried Scania K410C at Dandenong railway station in September 2023

From the 1940s, Ventura standardised on Commonwealth Aircraft Corporation bodied Bedford OBs. After purchasing a variety of AECs, Albions, Bedfords and Leylands in the 1960s, Ventura settled on heavy duty Leyland Worldmaster, Leopard and Tiger chassis for its purchases in the 1970s and 1980s.

In 1973, Ventura took delivery of the first of many Denning coaches. It would build up a sizeable fleet before scaling back its charter operations in the early 1990s.

The purchases of Bentleigh Bus Lines/Hawthorn Bus Service saw the fleet expand further. Many non-Leyland buses joined the fleet including Bedfords, Elwoods, Mercedes-Benzs and Volvo B10Ms.

When Ventura sought new buses in 1992 Leyland had ceased production, so two Scania L113s and a Volvo B10M with Volgren bodies were purchased for evaluation. Ventura settled on Scanias after the evaluation period and it has since been the main chassis used in the Ventura fleet with 388 in the fleet as of May 2022. It also purchased 107 Designline bodied MANs. Since 2013 the fleet has switched to Volgren bodied Volvo B7RLE and Scania K310UBs. As at June 2024, the fleet comprised 927 vehicles.

In 2017, the company began to integrate technology to track buses in real time across its route services.

The old Ventura fleet livery was light and dark blue with yellow signwriting. This was replaced in 2012 by a white with dark blue and yellow flashes livery, based on the Grenda livery. New deliveries are receiving the Public Transport Victoria white and orange livery with existing buses progressively repainted.

Buses which did not receive the Public Transport Victoria livery retained the previous Grenda livery, the former two-tone blue livery, the former blue, red and white livery of US Bus Lines or the Ivanhoe Bus Company green and yellow livery.

Eight buses are painted in SmartBus livery for use on the Route 900 service, four are in V/Line livery and a plain white livery with Ventura signage has been adopted for school/charter vehicles.
