= List of bus routes in Melbourne =

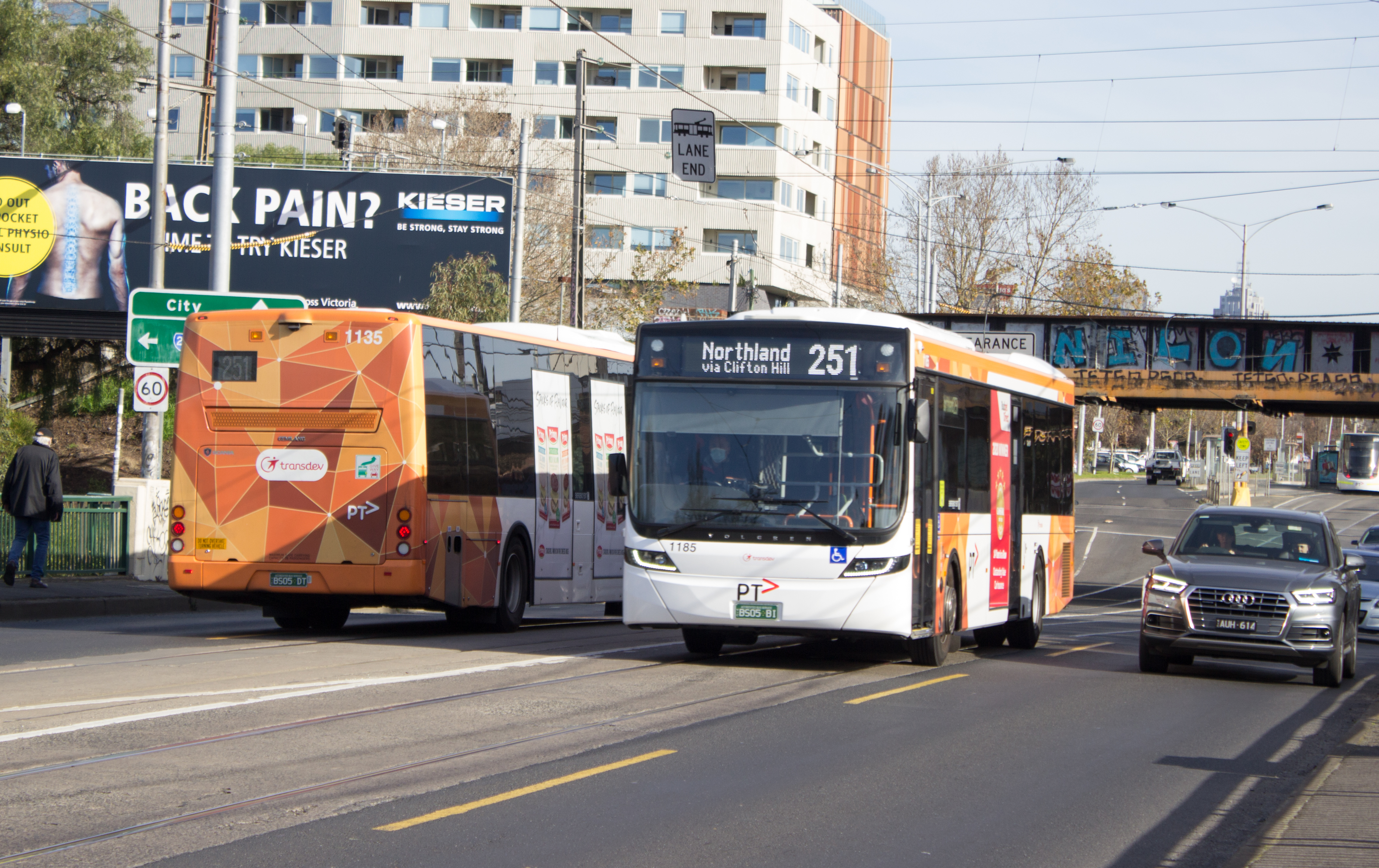
Two Transdev Melbourne buses operating route 251 in Clifton Hill

Melbourne's bus network is a major transport system in Australia, comprising around 400 bus routes. The bus network is run by private companies under contract to Public Transport Victoria. Buses in Melbourne use the Myki ticketing system, with the exception of SkyBus services.

Kinetic Melbourne operate approximately 30% of the bus network, signing contracts in 2021 as part of the Melbourne Metropolitan Bus Franchise. The remaining 70% of the network is operated under 23 contracts with other bus operators, all of these contracts were entered into in mid-2018 and will expire in 2025 or 2028.

All bus routes are allocated a number from 140-999, with the exception of SkyBus services. Route numbers below 140 are used by trams. The numbering of a route can indicate the geographical location served, the route's history, or the route's type of operation; for example, routes from the 900 series were historically used by the Victorian Railways, whose buses coordinated with trains on some routes, but now the series is used for the SmartBus and Night Network routes.

SkyBus services run to and from Melbourne and Avalon airports.

Some bus routes have been taken out of operation. They may have been scrapped, replaced (either by another route or a FlexiRide service), incorporated into existing routes, or split. Reasons may include low patronage, confusing routing, or infrequent service patterns.

== List of operational routes by number ==
=== 100–199 ===
Routes 100-199
Route	Image	Destinations	Operator(s)	Notes
109		Queen Bridge Street tram stop Station Pier	Ventura Bus Lines	Supplementary service to tram route 109 when cruise ships are docked at Station Pier
140		Tarneit station via Altezze Drive Rockbank station	Transit Systems Victoria	Commenced 28 June 2026 as 140A between Rockbank station and Mount Aktinson. Began as 140 and extended Tarneit station on 25 October 2026.
150		Williams Landing station via Sayers Road Tarneit station	CDC Melbourne	Commenced 21 July 2015 to replace part of former route 446, operates all night on Friday & Saturday nights as part of the Night Network
151		Williams Landing station via Westmeadows Lane Tarneit station	CDC Melbourne	Commenced 21 July 2015, replaced part of former routes 444 and 446
152		Williams Landing station via Palmers Road Tarneit station	CDC Melbourne	Commenced 30 May 2021
153		Williams Landing station via Princes Highway Werribee station	CDC Melbourne	Commenced 21 July 2015, replaced former routes 433, 443, and 493
154		Tarneit station via Truganina Laverton station	CDC Melbourne	Commenced 7 December 2025
160		Hoppers Crossing station via Morris Road Tarneit station	CDC Melbourne	Commenced 21 July 2015, replaced former route 444
161		Hoppers Crossing station via Pacific Werribee Werribee station	CDC Melbourne	Commenced 21 July 2015, replaced former routes 436 and 437
166		Hoppers Crossing station via Pacific Werribee Wyndham Vale station	CDC Melbourne	Commenced 21 July 2015, replaced routes 447 and 448
167		Hoppers Crossing station via Pacific Werribee Tarneit station	CDC Melbourne	Commenced 21 July 2015, replaced route 442
170		Werribee station via Pacific Werribee Tarneit station	CDC Melbourne	Commenced 21 July 2015
180		Werribee station via Tarneit Road Tarneit station	CDC Melbourne	Commenced 21 July 2015, operates all night on Friday & Saturday nights as part of the Night Network
181		Werribee station via Pacific Werribee Hoppers Crossing station	CDC Melbourne	Commenced 21 July 2015, replaced former routes 445 and 446
182		Werribee station via West Tarneit station Tarneit Station	CDC Melbourne	Commenced 30 May 2021, rerouted via West Tarneit station on 13 September 2026
186		West Tarneit station via Dohertys Road Tarneit Station	CDC Melbourne	Commenced 13 September 2026, with the opening of West Tarneit station
190		Werribee station via Ballan Road Wyndham Vale station	CDC Melbourne	Commenced 21 July 2015, operates all night on Friday & Saturday nights as part of the Night Network
191		Werribee station via Greaves Street Jubilee estate, Wyndham Vale	CDC Melbourne	Commenced 21 July 2015, replaced former route 448
192		Werribee station via Black Forest Road Wyndham Vale station	CDC Melbourne	Commenced 21 July 2015, replaced former route 449
194		Wyndham Vale station via Ison Road Werribee station	CDC Melbourne	Commenced 7 December 2025, terminating at Harpley Estate. Extended to Werribee on 13 September 2026.

=== 200–299 ===
Routes 200-299
Route	Image	Destinations	Operator(s)	Notes
200		City (Queen Street) via Kew Junction Bulleen	Kinetic Melbourne	
201		Box Hill station Deakin University	Ventura Bus Lines	Shuttle service to Deakin University Burwood
207		City (Queen Street) via Kew Junction Westfield Doncaster	Kinetic Melbourne	Operates all night on Friday & Saturday nights as part of the Night Network
215		Caroline Springs Highpoint Shopping Centre	Kinetic Melbourne	
216		Sunshine station via Footscray, Dynon Road City (Queen Street)	Kinetic Melbourne	Formerly ran between Sunshine & Brighton Beach until 16 November 2019 (now route 603).
220		Sunshine station via Footscray, Footscray Road, Queen Victoria Market City (Queen Street)	Kinetic Melbourne	Formerly ran between Sunshine & Gardenvale until 16 November 2019 (now route 604).
223		Yarraville via Footscray Highpoint Shopping Centre	Kinetic Melbourne	
232		Altona North Queen Victoria Market	Kinetic Melbourne	
234		Garden City Queen Victoria Market	Kinetic Melbourne	
235		Southern Cross station via Williamstown Road Fishermans Bend	Kinetic Melbourne	
236		Garden City via South Melbourne Queen Victoria Market	Kinetic Melbourne	
237		Southern Cross station via Lorimer St Fishermans Bend	Kinetic Melbourne	
241		North Melbourne station via Melbourne University Yarra Bend Park	Transit Systems Victoria	Commenced 1 February 2026, replaced former route 202 and 401
246		Elsternwick station via St Kilda Clifton Hill	Kinetic Melbourne	
250		City (Queen Street) via Clifton Hill La Trobe University, Bundoora	Kinetic Melbourne	Operates all night on Friday & Saturday nights as part of the Night Network
251		City (Queen Street) via Clifton Hill Northland Shopping Centre	Kinetic Melbourne	
270		Box Hill station via Blackburn North Mitcham	Kinetic Melbourne	
271		Box Hill station via Park Orchards Ringwood	Kinetic Melbourne	
273	Travelling east along Springvale Road	The Pines Shopping Centre Nunawading station	Kinetic Melbourne	
279		Box Hill station via Middleborough Road Westfield Doncaster or Templestowe	Kinetic Melbourne	
280		The Pines Shopping Centre Westfield Doncaster The Pines Shopping Centre	Kinetic Melbourne	Clockwise circular service
281		Templestowe via Westfield Doncaster Box Hill station	Kinetic Melbourne	Route truncated from Deakin University to Box Hill station from 16 October, 2023
282		The Pines Shopping Centre Westfield Doncaster The Pines Shopping Centre	Kinetic Melbourne	Anti-clockwise circular service
284		Box Hill station via Union Road Doncaster Park & Ride	Kinetic Melbourne	Route truncated from Westfield Doncaster to Doncaster Park & Ride
285		Doncaster Park & Ride via North Balwyn Camberwell	Kinetic Melbourne	Route truncated from Westfield Doncaster to Doncaster Park & Ride
293		Box Hill station via Westfield Doncaster Greensborough station	Kinetic Melbourne	
295		Westfield Doncaster The Pines Shopping Centre	Kinetic Melbourne	Route truncated from Box Hill station to Westfield Doncaster

=== 300–399 ===
Routes 300-399
Route	Image	Destinations	Operator(s)	Notes
301		Reservoir station La Trobe University (Bundoora Campus)	Kinetic Melbourne	University Shuttle Bus
302		City (Lonsdale Street) via Belmore Road, Eastern Freeway Box Hill station	Kinetic Melbourne	Originally had an extension to Crown Melbourne
303		City (Queen Street) via Park Rd Ringwood North	Kinetic Melbourne	Ceased 27 July 2014: Reinstated 13 October 2014
304		City (Lonsdale Street) via Belmore Road, Eastern Freeway Westfield Doncaster	Kinetic Melbourne	
305		City (Lonsdale Street) (peak) via Eastern Freeway or Westfield Doncaster (off-peak) via George Street The Pines Shopping Centre	Kinetic Melbourne	Originally ran to Warrandyte Bridge
309		City (Queen Street) via Eastern Freeway, Reynolds Road The Pines Shopping Centre	Kinetic Melbourne	
318		City (Lonsdale Street) Deep Creek	Kinetic Melbourne	
343		Hurstbridge station via Diamond Creek station Greensborough station	Kinetic Melbourne	
350		City (Queen Street) via Eastern Freeway La Trobe University, Bundoora	Kinetic Melbourne	
356		Epping station Wollert East	Kinetic Melbourne	
357		Wollert West Thomastown station	Kinetic Melbourne	Operates all night on Friday & Saturday nights as part of the Night Network
358		Epping Wollert	Kinetic Melbourne	
364		Warrandyte Ringwood	Kinetic Melbourne	
370		Mitcham via Ringwood North Ringwood	Kinetic Melbourne	
381		Diamond Creek station Mernda station	Kinetic Melbourne	
382		Whittlesea via South Morang station Northland Shopping Centre	Kinetic Melbourne	
383		Palisades University Hill	Kinetic Melbourne	
384		Kinglake Whittlesea	Kinetic Melbourne	The majority of services on this route run to the eastern end of Whittlesea, with 5 weekday services going to Kinglake and 2 making the trip to the next town along the route at Humevale.
385		Whittlesea / Mernda station Greensborough station	Kinetic Melbourne	
386		Mernda station via Cravens Road Bundoora RMIT	Kinetic Melbourne	Operates all night on Friday & Saturday nights as part of the Night Network
387		Mernda station via Hawkstowe Parade Bundoora RMIT	Kinetic Melbourne	
388		Mernda Loop	Kinetic Melbourne	Anti-clockwise circular service
389		Mernda Loop	Kinetic Melbourne	Clockwise circular service
390		Mernda via Wollert Craigieburn	Kinetic Melbourne	Commenced 31 October 2021

=== 400–499 ===
Routes 400-499
Route	Image	Destinations	Operator(s)	Notes	
400		Sunshine station via Robinsons Road Laverton station	CDC Melbourne Transit Systems Victoria	Known as the "Prison Bus", as it services Port Phillip Prison, the Metropolitan Remand Centre and the Dame Phyllis Frost Centre	
402		Footscray station via Kensington station East Melbourne	Transit Systems Victoria		
404		Footscray via Newmarket Moonee Ponds	Transit Systems Victoria		
405		Deer Park station via Cairnlea Drive Brimbank Shopping Centre	Transit Systems Victoria	Commenced 26 July 2026	
406		Keilor East via Highpoint Shopping Centre Footscray	CDC Melbourne	Operates all night on Friday & Saturday nights as part of the Night Network	
407		Highpoint Shopping Centre via Maribyrnong Avondale Heights	CDC Melbourne		
408		St Albans station via Sunshine station Highpoint Shopping Centre	CDC Melbourne		
409		Highpoint Shopping Centre via Footscray Yarraville	CDC Melbourne	Formerly Yarraville to West Footscray	
410		Sunshine station via Ballarat Road Footscray	CDC Melbourne	Operates all night on Friday & Saturday nights as part of the Night Network	
411		Footscray via Millers Rd, Altona North Laverton station	CDC Melbourne		
412		Footscray via Mills St, Altona North Laverton station	CDC Melbourne		
414		Footscray via Geelong Road Laverton station	CDC Melbourne		
415		Laverton station via Altona Williamstown	CDC Melbourne		
417		Laverton station Laverton North	CDC Melbourne		
418		St Albans station via Keilor Plains station Caroline Springs	CDC Melbourne		
419		St Albans station via Taylors Lakes Watergardens station	CDC Melbourne		
420		Sunshine via Deer Park Watergardens station	Transit Systems Victoria	Operates all night on Friday & Saturday nights as part of Night Network	
421		St Albans station via Keilor Downs Watergardens station	CDC Melbourne		
422		Sunshine station via Deer Park Brimbank Central Shopping Centre	Transit Systems Victoria		
423		St Albans station via Cairnlea Brimbank Central Shopping Centre	CDC Melbourne		
424		St Albans station via Albanvale Brimbank Central Shopping Centre	CDC Melbourne		
425		St Albans station via Delahey Watergardens station	CDC Melbourne		
426		Sunshine station Caroline Springs	Kinetic Melbourne		
427		Sunshine station via Forrest St Sunshine West	Transit Systems Victoria		
428		Sunshine station via Wright St Sunshine West	Transit Systems Victoria		
429		Sunshine station Sunshine South Loop	Kinetic Melbourne	Commenced 17 November 2019 to partly replace route 219	
431		Yarraville Kingsville	Transit Systems Victoria		
432		Newport via Altona Gate Shopping Centre Yarraville	Transit Systems Victoria	Formerly Newport to Paisley	
433		Darley via Bacchus Marsh station Hillview Estate	Christian's Bus Company	Formerly operated by Bacchus Marsh Coaches before they were acquired by Christian's in October 2019	
434		Bacchus Marsh station Telford Park	Christian's Bus Company	Formerly operated by Bacchus Marsh Coaches before they were acquired by Christian's in October 2019	
439		Werribee Werribee South	CDC Melbourne	Diverts via Werribee Park Mansion and Werribee Open Range Zoo during their opening hours	
441		Werribee Westleigh Gardens	CDC Melbourne		
443		Werribee South Ring Road	CDC Melbourne	Circular service	
444		Rockbank station Aintree	Transit Systems Victoria		
451		Cobblebank station Thornhill Park	Transit Systems Victoria	Commenced 26 July 2026	
452		Melton station via Weir Views Eynesbury	Christians Bus	Commenced 8 December 2024	
453		Melton via Brookfield Melton station	Transit Systems Victoria		
454		Melton station Cobblebank station	Transit Systems Victoria		
455		Melton station via Woodgrove Shopping Centre Micasa Rise	Transit Systems Victoria		
456		Sunshine via Caroline Springs Melton (Woodgrove Shopping Centre)	Transit Systems Victoria		
457		Melton via Melton West; Melton station	Transit Systems Victoria		
458		Melton station via Woodgrove Shopping Centre; Kurunjang	Transit Systems Victoria		
459		Melton station via Melton South; Arnolds Creek	Transit Systems Victoria		
460		Watergardens station via Gourlay Road Caroline Springs station	CDC Melbourne		
462		Watergardens station via Calder Park Drive, Taylors Hill Caroline Springs station	CDC Melbourne		
463		Watergardens station via Hillside Caroline Springs	CDC Melbourne	Commenced 12 July 2020 to replace part of route 476. Extended to Caroline Springs on 4 October 2026.	
464		CDC Melbourne Transit Systems Victoria	Watergardens station via Taylors Road Rockbank station	CDC Melbourne	Commenced 4 October 2026, partly replacing and extending former route 461.
465		Essendon station via Keilor East Keilor Park	CDC Melbourne		
467		Aberfeldie Moonee Ponds station	CDC Melbourne		
468		Essendon Highpoint Shopping Centre (Maribyrnong)	CDC Melbourne		
469		Moonee Ponds Junction Keilor East	CDC Melbourne	Commenced 12 July 2020 to replace routes 475 and 501	
471		Williamstown via Newport, Altona Gate Shopping Centre; Sunshine	Transit Systems Victoria		
472		Williamstown via Footscray; Moonee Ponds Junction	Transit Systems Victoria		
473		Gisborne station Gisborne	Gisborne Transit		
474		Gisborne station Gisborne	Gisborne Transit	On-Demand Service	
475		Sunbury Diggers Rest	Sunbury Bus Service	Commenced 24 March 2024	
476		Moonee Ponds Junction via Keilor; Watergardens Town Centre	CDC Melbourne	Previously operated to Hillside via Taylors Lakes until 11 July 2020. Deleted section replaced by route 463.	
477		Moonee Ponds Junction via Westfield Airport West; Broadmeadows	CDC Melbourne		
478		Westfield Airport West Melbourne Airport	CDC Melbourne	Operated to Moonee Ponds Junction until 27 July 2014	
479		Westfield Airport West via Melbourne Airport; Sunbury	CDC Melbourne	Previously operated to Moonee Ponds Junction & to the city on weekends. Both ceased 27 July 2014	
481		Sunbury Sunbury (Mount Lion)	Sunbury Bus Service		
482		Westfield Airport West Melbourne Airport	CDC Melbourne	Operates during peak hours only	
483		Sunbury via Diggers Rest; Moonee Ponds Junction	Sunbury Bus Service		
484		Broadmeadows Roxburgh Park	CDC Melbourne		
485		Sunbury Sunbury (Wilsons Lane)	Sunbury Bus Service		
486		Sunbury Sunbury (Rolling Meadows)	Sunbury Bus Service		
487		Sunbury Sunbury (Killara Heights)	Sunbury Bus Service		
488		Sunbury Sunbury (Jacksons Hill)	Sunbury Bus Service		
489		Sunbury Sunbury (Canterbury Hills)	Sunbury Bus Service		
490		Westfield Airport West Gowanbrae	CDC Melbourne	On demand bus service for part of the route, requires passengers to book 15 mins in advance from designated bus stops.	
494		Williams Landing station via Alamanda Bvd; Point Cook South	CDC Melbourne		
495		Williams Landing station via Broadwalk Boulevard; Point Cook South	CDC Melbourne		
496		Laverton station via Sanctuary Lakes Shopping Centre; Sanctuary Lakes	CDC Melbourne	Commenced 28 April 2013 as a service to Sanctuary Lakes Shopping Centre. Extended to Sanctuary Lakes as part of the introduction of the Regional Rail Link.	
497		Williams Landing station via Sanctuary Lakes Shopping Centre; Saltwater Estate	CDC Melbourne		
498		Laverton station via Dunnings Rd; Hoppers Crossing station	CDC Melbourne	Commenced 21 June 2015 as part of the introduction of the Regional Rail Link	

=== 500–599 ===
Routes 500-599
Route	Image	Destinations	Operator(s)	Notes
501		Donnybrook via Hume Freeway Craigieburn	CDC Melbourne	Commenced 7 January 2024
503		Essendon station via Albion Street Brunswick East	Kinetic Melbourne	Operated by Moonee Valley Coaches until March 2024, then Dysons until July 2025
504		Moonee Ponds Junction via Brunswick East Clifton Hill	Kinetic Melbourne	
505		Moonee Ponds Junction via Parkville Gardens Melbourne University	Kinetic Melbourne	Introduced 8 May 2011. Most services through-route with 546 to Heidelberg since 14 July 2024.
506		Moonee Ponds Junction via Brunswick Westgarth	Kinetic Melbourne	Operated by Moonee Valley Coaches until March 2024, then Dysons until July 2025
508		Moonee Ponds Junction via Northcote, Brunswick Alphington	Kinetic Melbourne	
509		Barkly Square via Hope Street Brunswick West	Kinetic Melbourne	Discontinued 29 September 2012. Reinstated in 2016
510		Essendon station via Northcote, Brunswick, Thornbury Ivanhoe station	Kinetic Melbourne	Operated by MorelandBus until October 2023
511		Beveridge (Mandalay) Craigieburn Station	CDC Melbourne	
512		Strathmore via Coburg Coburg East	Kinetic Melbourne	Operated by MorelandBus until October 2023
513		Eltham station via Lower Plenty Glenroy station	Kinetic Melbourne	Formerly alternated running via either Greensborough or Lower Plenty until 2 July 2022, altered to operate via Lower Plenty only. Services terminate at Heidelberg station on weekends since 7 September 2025.
514		Eltham via Greensborough Glenroy	Kinetic Melbourne	Commenced 3 July 2022, replacing the Greensborough deviation of route 513
517		Northland Shopping Centre via Greensborough, Viewbank St Helena	Kinetic Melbourne	
518		Greensborough station via St Helena St Helena West	Kinetic Melbourne	
524		Donnybrook (Peppercorn Hill Estate) via Donnybrook station Kalkallo	CDC Melbourne	Commenced 16 March 2025, extended to Kalkallo 5 October 2025
525		Donnybrook via Mickleham Craigieburn	CDC Melbourne	Commenced 22 December 2019
526		Coburg via Elizabeth Street Reservoir	Ventura Bus Lines	
527		Northland Shopping Centre via Coburg Gowrie station	Ventura Bus Lines	
528		Craigieburn station Craigieburn Central Shopping Centre	CDC Melbourne	
529		Craigieburn station via Craigieburn Central Shopping Centre Craigieburn North	CDC Melbourne	
530		Coburg via Gowrie station, Fawkner and Coburg North Campbellfield Plaza	CDC Melbourne	
531		Coburg North via Somerset Estate Upfield station	CDC Melbourne	
532		Craigieburn station via Upfield Broadmeadows station	CDC Melbourne	
533		Craigieburn via Hanson Road Craigieburn North	CDC Melbourne	
534		Glenroy via Boundary Road Coburg	CDC Melbourne	
536		Glenroy station Gowrie station	CDC Melbourne	
537		Craigieburn station via Cimberwood Drive Craigieburn Central Shopping Centre	CDC Melbourne	
538		Broadmeadows via Camp Road Campbellfield (Somerset Estate)	CDC Melbourne	
540		Broadmeadows via Coolaroo Upfield	CDC Melbourne	
541		Broadmeadows station via Meadow Heights Craigeburn North	CDC Melbourne	
542		Roxburgh Park via Meadow Heights, Broadmeadows, Glenroy, Oak Park Pascoe Vale	CDC Melbourne	
543		Craigieburn Central Shopping Centre Roxburgh Park	CDC Melbourne	Extended to Roxburgh Park on 5 October 2025
544		Craigieburn station via Roxburgh Park Shopping Centre Roxburgh Park railway station	CDC Melbourne	
546		Heidelberg via Clifton Hill Melbourne University	Kinetic Melbourne	Off-peak extension to Queen Victoria Market abolished 14 July 2024. Most services through-route with 505 to Moonee Ponds Junction since 14 July 2024.
548		Kew (Cotham Road) via Ivanhoe La Trobe University, Bundoora	Ventura Bus Lines	
549		Ivanhoe Northland Shopping Centre	Ventura Bus Lines	
550		Northland Shopping Centre La Trobe University, Bundoora	Ventura Bus Lines	
551		Heidelberg La Trobe University, Bundoora	Ventura Bus Lines	
552		Reservoir North East via High Street Northcote Plaza	Kinetic Melbourne	
553		Preston via Reservoir West Preston	Kinetic Melbourne	
554		Thomastown Thomastown	Kinetic Melbourne	Clockwise loop via West Lalor
555		Epping via Lalor, Thomastown, Reservoir Northland Shopping Centre	Kinetic Melbourne	
556		Epping via Keon Park Northland Shopping Centre	Kinetic Melbourne	
557		Thomastown via Lalor Thomastown	Kinetic Melbourne	Anti-clockwise loop via West Lalor
558		Reservoir via North West Reservoir Reservoir	Kinetic Melbourne	
559		Thomastown via Lalor Thomastown	Kinetic Melbourne	Circular Route via Lalor Plaza Shopping Centre
561		Pascoe Vale via La Trobe University Macleod	Kinetic Melbourne	
564		South Morang station via Mill Park Stables Shopping Centre Bundoora RMIT	Kinetic Melbourne	
566		Northland Shopping Centre via Bundoora, Greensborough Lalor	Kinetic Melbourne	
567		Northcote via Northland Shopping Centre Regent station	Kinetic Melbourne	
569		Pacific Epping via Mill Park South Morang station	Kinetic Melbourne	
570		Thomastown via Lalor Plaza Shopping Centre RMIT, Bundoora	Kinetic Melbourne	
577		South Morang via Epping station Pacific Epping	Kinetic Melbourne	
578		Eltham via Kangaroo Ground – Warrandyte Road Warrandyte	Kinetic Melbourne	
579		Eltham via Research – Warrandyte Road Warrandyte	Kinetic Melbourne	
580		Eltham via Ryans Road Diamond Creek	Kinetic Melbourne	
582		Eltham via Main Rd Eltham	Kinetic Melbourne	Circular Route via Eucalyptus Road

=== 600–699 ===
Routes 600-699
Route	Image	Destinations	Operator(s)	Notes
600		St Kilda Light Rail station Westfield Southland	Kinetic Melbourne	operated by Melbourne-Brighton Bus Lines until April 1985
601		Huntingdale station Monash University, Clayton campus	CDC Melbourne	University Shuttle Bus; Operates on weekdays only
603		Brighton Beach via Elsternwick station Burnley station	Kinetic Melbourne	Commenced 17 November 2019 between Alfred Hospital and Brighton Beach, replacing 216; Altered to Burnley on 17 November 2024
604		Elsternwick station via Orrong Road Anzac station	Kinetic Melbourne	Commenced 17 November 2019 between Alfred Hospital and Gardenvale, replacing 220; Altered to run between Anzac and Elsternwick on 17 November 2024
605		Queen Victoria Market via Kooyong Road Gardenvale	CDC Melbourne	Altered via Royal Botanic Gardens, Southbank and terminating at Flagstaff railway station on 25 June 2017; Terminus at City (Queen Street) made permanent on 29 March 2020; Altered via Domain Road, Anzac station and St Kilda Road on 17 November 2024
606		Elsternwick via St Kilda Fishermans Bend	CDC Melbourne	
609		Fairfield via Royal Talbot Hospital & Kew Hawthorn	Kinetic Melbourne	
612		Box Hill station via Camberwell, Glen Iris Chadstone Shopping Centre	CDC Melbourne	
623		Glen Waverley St Kilda	CDC Melbourne	
624		Kew via Carnegie or Darling station Oakleigh	CDC Melbourne	
625		Elsternwick Chadstone	CDC Melbourne	
626		Middle Brighton Chadstone	CDC Melbourne	
627		Chadstone Shopping Centre via Bentleigh East Moorabbin station	Ventura Bus Lines	Commenced 16 June 2019; not to be confused with former route 627.
630		Elwood Monash University	CDC Melbourne	Operates all night on Friday & Saturday nights as part of the Night Network
631		Waverley Gardens Shopping Centre via Monash University Westfield Southland	Ventura Bus Lines	
663		Belgrave via Monbulk, Silvan and Mt Evelyn Lilydale	Ventura Bus Lines	
664		Westfield Knox via Croydon and Bayswater Chirnside Park	Ventura Bus Lines	
668		Ringwood via Croydon Hills Croydon	Kinetic Melbourne	
669		Ringwood via Ringwood East Croydon	Kinetic Melbourne	
670		Ringwood via Croydon and Chirnside Park Lilydale	Ventura Bus Lines	Operates all night on Friday & Saturday nights as part of the Night Network
671		Chirnside Park Croydon	Ventura Bus Lines	
672		Croydon via Croydon Hills & Wonga Park Chirnside Park	Ventura Bus Lines	
675		Chirnside Park Mooroolbark	Ventura Bus Lines	
677		Lilydale via The Gateway Chirnside Park	Ventura Bus Lines	
679		Chirnside Park via Lilydale and Montrose Ringwood	Ventura Bus Lines	
680		Lilydale Mooroolbark	Ventura Bus Lines	
681		Westfield Knox via Rowville & Lysterfield Westfield Knox	Ventura Bus Lines	Loop service, on a clockwise route
682		Westfield Knox via Rowville & Lysterfield Westfield Knox	Ventura Bus Lines	Loop service, on an anti-clockwise route
683		Chirnside Park Warburton	Martyrs Bus Service	Country fares apply from Woori Yallock
684		Ringwood station via Healesville, Marysville & Alexandra Eildon	McKenzie's Tourist Services	Country fares apply from Healesville, minimal services. Truncated from Southern Cross station to Ringwood station in November 2023
685		Lilydale station via Coldstream & Yarra Glen Healesville Sanctuary	McKenzie's Tourist Services	Truncated from Chirnside Park to Lilydale station in November 2023
688		Croydon via Olinda & Tremont Upper Ferntree Gully	Ventura Bus Lines	
689		Croydon Montrose	Ventura Bus Lines	
690		Croydon via Kilsyth South Boronia	Ventura Bus Lines	
691		Boronia via Ferntree Gully & Rowville Waverley Gardens Shopping Centre	Ventura Bus Lines	
693		Belgrave Oakleigh	Ventura Bus Lines	Operates all night on Friday & Saturday nights between Oakleigh station & Scoresby as part of the Night Network
694		Belgrave via Sherbrooke Road & Olinda Mt. Dandenong	Ventura Bus Lines	
695		Belgrave Gembrook	Ventura Bus Lines	
695F		Westfield Fountain Gate Gembrook	Ventura Bus Lines	Operates on Friday nights & weekends only, one service operates between Emerald & Dandenong Market on Tuesdays only
696		Olinda via Olinda Monbulk Road Monbulk	Ventura Bus Lines	
697		Belgrave Belgrave South	Ventura Bus Lines	One service extends to Dandenong Market on Tuesdays only and to Westfield Fountain Gate on Thursdays only
699		Belgrave Upwey	Ventura Bus Lines	

=== 700–799 ===
Routes 700-799
Route	Image	Destinations	Operator(s)	Notes
701		Oakleigh Bentleigh	Ventura Bus Lines	
703		Blackburn Middle Brighton	Ventura Bus Lines	SmartBus route, operates all night on Friday & Saturday nights as part of the Night Network
704		Westall station Oakleigh	Ventura Bus Lines	Previously ran to East Clayton until 15 May 2020
705		Mordialloc via Braeside & Clayton South Springvale	Ventura Bus Lines	
706		Mordialloc via Aspendale & Edithvale Chelsea	Ventura Bus Lines	
708		Carrum via Westfield Southland Hampton	Ventura Bus Lines	
709		Mordialloc via Governor Road Noble Park station	Ventura Bus Lines	
732		Box Hill station via Vermont South Tram Terminus Upper Ferntree Gully	Ventura Bus Lines	Services to/from Westfield Knox connect with tram route 75 to/from the City at Vermont South.
733		Box Hill station Oakleigh	Ventura Bus Lines	
734		Glen Iris Glen Waverley	Ventura Bus Lines	
735		Box Hill station via K-Mart Plaza, Forest Hill Chase Shopping Centre Nunawading	Ventura Bus Lines	
736		Mitcham station via Glen Waverley Blackburn station	Ventura Bus Lines	On Saturday only, half the services runs Mitcham to Glen Waverley
737		Croydon station via Boronia Station, Westfield Knox, Glen Waverley station Monash University, Clayton campus	Ventura Bus Lines	Some services run via deviations through Bayswater and Croydon.
738		Mitcham station via Knox Private Hospital, Wantirna College Westfield Knox	Ventura Bus Lines	
740		Mitcham station via Reserve Avenue, Churinga Avenue Vermont East	Ventura Bus Lines	One service starts from Vermont Secondary College each weekday.
742		Ringwood station via Vermont South, Glen Waverley station, Oakleigh Station Chadstone Shopping Centre	Ventura Bus Lines	Some early morning and late evening services are shortened.; Some services do not utilise the Monash University deviation.; Route formerly terminated at Eastland Shopping Centre until 10 April 2021.
745A		Westfield Knox via Scoresby Road, Victoria Road and Sasses Avenue Bayswater station	Ventura Bus Lines	rowspan="4"
745B		Bayswater station Via Victoria Road and Sasses Avenue Boronia station	Ventura Bus Lines	
745C		Bayswater station Via Victoria Road and Sasses Avenue Wantirna Primary School	Ventura Bus Lines	
745D		Bayswater station Via Mountain Highway and Stud Road Wantirna Primary School	Ventura Bus Lines	
753		Glen Waverley via Wheelers Hill and Knoxfield Boronia station / Bayswater station	Ventura Bus Lines	Only limited services run the full route to Bayswater, most services commence or terminate at Boronia
754		Glen Waverley via Wheelers Hill Rowville	Ventura Bus Lines	During the morning peak, some services run express to Glen Waverley, during the evening peak, some services run express to Rowville
755		Bayswater via The Basin & Ferntree Gully Westfield Knox	Ventura Bus Lines	Some weekday off-peak services terminate/commence at The Basin, Westfield Knox bound buses serve Ferntree Gully station, Bayswater bound buses do not
757		Westfield Knox Scoresby	Ventura Bus Lines	
758		Westfield Knox Knoxfield Shops	Ventura Bus Lines	
760		Cranbourne via Carrum Downs Seaford	Ventura Bus Lines	
765		Box Hill station via Blackburn Mitcham	Ventura Bus Lines	
766		Box Hill station Burwood	Ventura Bus Lines	
767		Westfield Southland via Deakin University Box Hill station	Ventura Bus Lines	
770		Frankston via Ashleigh Avenue Karingal Hub Shopping Centre	Ventura Bus Lines	
771		Frankston via McMahons Road or Orwil Street Langwarrin	Ventura Bus Lines	Service alternates between travelling down Orwil Street (which return to Frankston station) and McMahons Road
772		Frankston Eliza Heights	Ventura Bus Lines	Loop service, which returns to Frankston via Delacombe Park
773		Frankston Frankston South	Ventura Bus Lines	Loop service, returning to Frankston, on Saturday, the bus runs to Frankston South via an alternate route, returning via the normal route
774		Frankston Delacombe Park	Ventura Bus Lines	Loop Service, which returns to Frankston via a different route
775		Frankston Lakewood	Ventura Bus Lines	
776		Frankston Pearcedale	Ventura Bus Lines	Loop Service, returning to Frankston, the route is Clockwise in the morning, and anti-clockwise in the afternoon
777		Karingal Hub Shopping Centre McClelland Drive, Langwarrin	Ventura Bus Lines	
778		Kananook station Carrum Downs	Ventura Bus Lines	
779		Frankston Belvedere	Ventura Bus Lines	
780		Frankston Carrum	Ventura Bus Lines	
781		Frankston via Mornington Dromana	Ventura Bus Lines	Extended from Mount Martha to Dromana on 20 February 2022
782		Frankston via Hastings Flinders	Ventura Bus Lines	Country fares apply from Sandy Point Road to Flinders
783		Frankston Hastings	Ventura Bus Lines	
784		Frankston via Mount Eliza Mornington	Ventura Bus Lines	
785		Frankston via Mount Eliza Mornington East	Ventura Bus Lines	
787		Sorrento Rosebud	Ventura Bus Lines	Country fares apply, truncated to Rosebud Plaza on 20 February 2022. Runs through many small streets with an indirect route
788		Frankston Portsea	Ventura Bus Lines	Country fares apply, operates all night on Friday & Saturday nights between Sorrento & Frankston station as part of the Night Network
789		Langwarrin via Langwarrin North Frankston	Cranbourne Transit	Truncated to Langwarrin from 13 November 2016, previously ran to Cranbourne West
790		Langwarrin via Langwarrin South Frankston	Cranbourne Transit	Truncated to Langwarrin from 13 November 2016, previously ran to Cranbourne West
791		Cranbourne Frankston	Cranbourne Transit	
792		Cranbourne Pearcedale	Cranbourne Transit	Introduced 13 November 2016
795		Cranbourne Warneet	Cranbourne Transit	Weekdays only, loop with differing paths for each scheduled service. AM services run anti-clockwise via Cannons Creek - Warneet - Tooradin, PM services run clockwise via Tooradin - Warneet - Cannons Creek
796		Cranbourne Clyde	Cranbourne Transit	Loop service via Devon Meadows
798		Cranbourne Selandra Rise Estate	Cranbourne Transit	
799		Merinda Park station The Avenue Village Shopping Centre	Cranbourne Transit	

=== 800–899 ===
Routes 800-899
Route	Image	Destinations	Operator(s)	Notes
800		Dandenong via Springvale and Oakleigh Chadstone Shopping Centre	Ventura Bus Lines	
802		Dandenong via Mulgrave and Oakleigh Chadstone Shopping Centre	Ventura Bus Lines	
804		Dandenong via Wheelers Hill and Oakleigh Chadstone Shopping Centre	Ventura Bus Lines	
811		Dandenong via Springvale and Westfield Southland Brighton	Ventura Bus Lines	
812		Dandenong via Parkmore and Westfield Southland Brighton; Terminates at Braeside on evenings & weekends	Ventura Bus Lines	
813		Dandenong via Parkmore and Springvale Waverley Gardens Shopping Centre	Ventura Bus Lines	
814		Dandenong via Waverley Gardens Shopping Centre Springvale South	Ventura Bus Lines	
816		Keysborough South Noble Park	Ventura Bus Lines	Commenced 28 November 2021
822		Chadstone Shopping Centre via Westfield Southland Sandringham	Ventura Bus Lines	
823		North Brighton Westfield Southland	Ventura Bus Lines	
824		Moorabbin via Clayton Keysborough	Ventura Bus Lines	
825		Moorabbin via Mentone Westfield Southland	Ventura Bus Lines	
828		Hampton via Dandenong Berwick	Ventura Bus Lines	
831		Kingsmere Estate via Casey Hospital Berwick station	Ventura Bus Lines	
832		Frankston Carrum Downs	Ventura Bus Lines	
833		Frankston Carrum station	Ventura Bus Lines	Operates all night on Friday & Saturday nights as part of the Night Network
834		Berwick via Narre Warren Berwick	Ventura Bus Lines	Loop service, runs anti-clockwise
835		Berwick via Narre Warren Berwick	Ventura Bus Lines	Loop service, runs clockwise
836		Eden Rise Shopping Centre via Bridgewater Estate Berwick station	Ventura Bus Lines	
837		Berwick station Beaconsfield East	Ventura Bus Lines	
838		Emerald via Beaconsfield Westfield Fountain Gate	Ventura Bus Lines	
839		Berwick station North Berwick	Ventura Bus Lines	
840		Gembrook Pakenham	Ventura Bus Lines	Formerly Narre Warren – Berwick Circle
841		Narre Warren North Cranbourne	Ventura Bus Lines	
842		Endeavour Hills Westfield Fountain Gate	Ventura Bus Lines	
843		Dandenong via Daniel Solander Drive Endeavour Hills	Ventura Bus Lines	
844		Dandenong Doveton	Ventura Bus Lines	
845		Dandenong via Kennington Park Drive Endeavour Hills	Ventura Bus Lines	
846		Eden Rise Shopping Centre via Bryn Mawr Boulevard Berwick station	Ventura Bus Lines	
847		The Avenue Village Shopping Centre Berwick station	Ventura Bus Lines	
848		Dandenong Brandon Park Shopping Centre	Ventura Bus Lines	
850		Dandenong via Waverley Gardens Shopping Centre Glen Waverley	Ventura Bus Lines	
857		Chelsea via Patterson Lakes Dandenong	Ventura Bus Lines	
858		Edithvale via Chelsea Aspendale Gardens	Ventura Bus Lines	
861		Dandenong via Dandenong Hospital Endeavour Hills	Ventura Bus Lines	
862		Dandenong Chadstone Shopping Centre	Ventura Bus Lines	
863		Endeavour Hills Hampton Park Shopping Centre	Ventura Bus Lines	
881		Merinda Park station Clyde North	Cranbourne Transit	Commenced 30 January 2022
885		Glen Waverley via Wanda Street Springvale	Ventura Bus Lines	
886		Mornington via Tyabb Hastings	Ventura Bus Lines	Commenced 5 July 2026
887		Frankston station via Monash University, Peninsula campus Rosebud	Ventura Bus Lines	Express bus with a large section of freeway running
888		Berwick station Clyde	Ventura Bus Lines	Commenced 28 March 2021
889		Berwick station Clyde North	Ventura Bus Lines	Commenced 28 March 2021
890		Lynbrook station Dandenong station	Cranbourne Transit	
891		Lynbrook station Westfield Fountain Gate	Cranbourne Transit	
892		Narre Warren South Dandenong	Cranbourne Transit	
893		Cranbourne via Hampton Park Dandenong	Cranbourne Transit	
894		Amberley Park (Narre Warren South) Hallam station	Cranbourne Transit	
895		Narre Warren South via Hampton Park Westfield Fountain Gate	Cranbourne Transit	
897		Lynbrook station Clyde	Cranbourne Transit	
898		Cranbourne Archers Field Drive (Cranbourne East)	Cranbourne Transit	
899		The Avenue Village Shopping Centre Berwick station	Ventura Bus Lines	

=== 900–999 ===
Routes 900-999
Route	Image	Destinations	Operator(s)	Notes
900		Stud Park Shopping Centre via Huntingdale, Oakleigh, Chadstone Shopping Centre Caulfield	Ventura Bus Lines CDC Melbourne	SmartBus route, operates all night on Friday & Saturday nights between Stud Park Shopping Centre & Oakleigh as part of the Night Network
901		Frankston station via Dandenong, Westfield Knox, Ringwood, Blackburn, The Pines, Greensborough, South Morang, Epping and Broadmeadows Melbourne Airport	Kinetic Melbourne	SmartBus route, operates all night on Friday & Saturday nights between Dandenong & Ringwood as part of the Night Network
902		Chelsea station via Springvale, Glen Waverley, Nunawading, Doncaster, Eltham, Greensborough, Keon Park, Broadmeadows Westfield Airport West	Kinetic Melbourne	SmartBus route
903		Altona station via Sunshine, Essendon, Northland Shopping Centre, Heidelberg, Doncaster, Box Hill station, Chadstone Shopping Centre, Oakleigh, Mentone Mordialloc Centreway Shopping Centre	Kinetic Melbourne	SmartBus route
905		City via Eastern Freeway, Templestowe The Pines Shopping Centre	Kinetic Melbourne	SmartBus route, operates all night on Friday & Saturday nights as part of the Night Network
906		City via Eastern Freeway, The Pines Shopping Centre Warrandyte Bridge	Kinetic Melbourne	SmartBus route
907		City via Eastern Freeway, Doncaster Mitcham station	Kinetic Melbourne	SmartBus route, operates all night on Friday & Saturday nights as part of the Night Network
908		City via Eastern Freeway, Templestowe Lower (Terminates at Doncaster Park & Ride during off-peak) The Pines Shopping Centre	Kinetic Melbourne	SmartBus route, operates all night on Friday & Saturday nights as part of the Night Network
922		Westfield Southland via North Brighton St Kilda Light Rail station	Kinetic Melbourne	
923		Westfield Southland via Brighton Beach station St Kilda Light Rail station	Kinetic Melbourne	
925		Pakenham station via Cardinia Road station Officer South	Ventura Bus Lines	Extended to Officer South on 23 March 2025
926		Westfield Fountain Gate via Lakeside Village Shopping Centre and Beaconsfield Pakenham	Ventura Bus Lines	
927		Pakenham station via Meadowvale Village Pakenham North	Ventura Bus Lines	
928		Pakenham station via Cardinia Road station Berwick station	Ventura Bus Lines	Extended from Cardinia Road station to Berwick station via Rix Road on 1 August 2025
929		Pakenham station via Army Road Pakenham North	Ventura Bus Lines	
941		Sunshine station via Keilor Downs Watergardens station	Transit Systems Victoria	Operates all night on Friday & Saturday nights as part of the Night Network
943		Watergardens station via Caroline Springs Melton	Transit Systems Victoria	Operates all night on Friday & Saturday nights as part of the Night Network
947		Footscray station Newport	Transit Systems Victoria	Operates all night on Friday & Saturday nights as part of the Night Network
949		Williams Landing via Point Cook Altona Meadows	Transit Systems Victoria	Operates all night on Friday & Saturday nights as part of the Night Network
951		Brunswick station via Brunswick West & Pascoe Vale Glenroy station	Ventura Bus Lines	Operates all night on Friday & Saturday nights as part of the Night Network
953		Broadmeadows station via Meadow Heights & Roxburgh Park Craigieburn station	Ventura Bus Lines	Operates all night on Friday & Saturday nights as part of the Night Network
959		City via Airport West & Niddrie Broadmeadows station	Ventura Bus Lines	Operates all night on Friday & Saturday nights as part of the Night Network
965		Lilydale station via Woori Yallock & Healesville Lilydale station	McKenzie's Tourist Services	Operates all night on Friday & Saturday nights as part of the Night Network
967		Glen Waverley station via Knox City Croydon station	Ventura Bus Lines	Returns via Kilsyth & Boronia, operates all night on Friday & Saturday nights as part of the Night Network
978		Clayton station via Mulgrave Dandenong station	Ventura Bus Lines	Operates all night on Friday & Saturday nights as part of the Night Network
979		Clayton station via Keysborough Dandenong station	Ventura Bus Lines	Operates all night on Friday & Saturday nights as part of the Night Network
981		Dandenong station via Berwick & Narre Warren South Cranbourne station	Ventura Bus Lines	Operates all night on Friday & Saturday nights as part of the Night Network
982		Dandenong station via Endeavour Hills & Hampton Park Cranbourne station	Ventura Bus Lines	Operates all night on Friday & Saturday nights as part of the Night Network

== List of other operational bus routes ==
=== Airports ===
Routes to airports
Destinations	Operator(s)	Notes
City (Southern Cross station) Melbourne Airport; Express Service	SkyBus	
City (Southern Cross station) via Werribee RSL Avalon Airport	SkyBus	
Frankston Melbourne Airport	SkyBus	Peninsula Express via 12 dedicated intermediate stops, including St Kilda and Brighton
Box Hill Melbourne Airport	SkyBus	Eastern Express via 3 dedicated intermediate stops, including Watsonia and Doncaster
Sunshine Melbourne Airport	SkyBus	Sunshine Express

== List of former routes ==
Former bus routes
Route	Destinations	Operator(s)	Notes
201	City via Kew Junction Westfield Doncaster	Transdev Melbourne	Ceased 27 July 2014, replaced by route 304
202	Box Hill station via Balwyn Kew East	Transdev Melbourne	Ceased 27 July 2014, incorporated into route 302
202	Melbourne University via Victoria Park Yarra Bend Park	Kinetic Melbourne	Commenced 20 September 2021, limited stops service, replaced by route 241 in 2026
203	City via Eastern Freeway Bulleen	Transdev Melbourne	Ceased 27 July 2014, incorporated into route 200
205	Melbourne University via Kew Junction Westfield Doncaster	Transdev Melbourne	Ceased 27 July 2014, incorporated into route 200
219	Sunshine South via Footscray, City Gardenvale	Transdev Melbourne	Ceased 17 November 2019, replaced by routes 216, 429, 603, and 604
238	City Port Melbourne	Transdev Melbourne	Ceased 27 July 2014, replaced by routes 234 and 236
249	City La Trobe University, Bundoora	National Bus Company	Route scrapped
253	Garden City (Port Melbourne) via City North Carlton	Transdev Melbourne	Ceased 27 July 2014, replaced by routes 234 and 236
283	Westfield Doncaster Bulleen	National Bus Company	Incorporated into routes 280/282 on 24 November 2008
286	Box Hill station via Blackburn The Pines Shopping Centre	Transdev Melbourne	Ceased 27 July 2014, partly replaced by route 271
289	Box Hill station Donvale	National Bus Company	Incorporated into routes 280/282, 281 & 305 on 24 November 2008
291	Box Hill station via Westfield Doncaster Heidelberg	National Bus Company	Incorporated into route 903 on 20 April 2009
301	City via Templestowe The Pines Shopping Centre	National Bus Company	Replaced by route 905 (as part of Doncaster Area Rapid Transit) on 4 October 2010
306	City via Doncaster East, Canopus Drive Ringwood North	National Bus Company	Incorporated into route 303 on 4 October 2010
307	City via Donvale Mitcham	National Bus Company	Replaced by route 907 (as part of Doncaster Area Rapid Transit) on 4 October 2010
313	City Doncaster Park & Ride	Transdev Melbourne	Ceased 27 July 2014
315	City Box Hill station	Transdev Melbourne	Ceased 27 July 2014
316	City Deep Creek	National Bus Company	Ceased on 4 October 2010
340	City via Thornbury La Trobe University, Bundoora	Transdev Melbourne	Ceased 27 July 2014, replaced by route 350
365	Ringwood via Tunstall Square Westfield Doncaster	National Bus Company	Incorporated into routes 271, 280, and 282 on 24 November 2008
366	Ringwood via Croydon Hills Croydon	Transdev Melbourne	Ceased 27 July 2014, replaced by route 380
367	Ringwood via Ringwood East Croydon	Transdev Melbourne	Ceased 27 July 2014, replaced by route 380
380	Ringwood Croydon	Kinetic Melbourne	Loop service replacing routes 366 and 367, ceased 9 November 2024, split into routes 668 and 669
401	North Melbourne station via Royal Melbourne Hospital University of Melbourne	Transit Systems Victoria	Ceased 1 February 2026, due to Metro Tunnel opening, replaced by route 241
403	Footscray University of Melbourne	Transit Systems Victoria	Ceased 1 February 2026, due to Metro Tunnel opening
413	Laverton via Hoppers Crossing Pacific Werribee	CDC Melbourne	Scrapped 28 April 2013 due to Williams Landing station opening, partly replaced by routes 493, 494, and 496
416	Laverton Hoppers Crossing	CDC Melbourne	Scrapped 28 April 2013 due to Williams Landing station opening, partly replaced by routes 493, 495, and 496
422	St Albans Delahey	CDC Melbourne	Scrapped 27 July 2014, replaced by routes 424 and 425
429	Yarraville Altona East	Sita Buslines	Incorporated into routes 431 and 432 on 30 June 2008
430	Yarraville Geelong Road, Yarraville	Sita Buslines	Circular route, replaced by routes 431 and 432 on 30 June 2008
433	Newport Geelong Road, Brooklyn	Sita Buslines	Incorporated into route 471
438	Werribee Manor Lakes	Westrans	Replaced by routes 447, 448 & 449 on 19 April 2010
440	Werribee via Wyndham Vale, Pacific Werribee Hoppers Crossing	Westrans	Circular route, replaced by routes 446, 448 & 449 on 19 April 2010
442	Hoppers Crossing via Pacific Werribee, The Grange Tarneit	CDC Melbourne	Ceased 21 June 2015, replaced by route 167
447	Werribee via Ballan Road Manor Lakes	CDC Melbourne	Ceased 21 June 2015, replaced by route 166
448	Pacific Werribee via Greaves Street North Manor Lakes	CDC Melbourne	Ceased 21 June 2015, replaced by routes 166 and 191
449	Werribee via Black Forest Road Manor Lakes	CDC Melbourne	Ceased 21 June 2015, replaced by route 192
451	Sunshine Brimbank Central Shopping Centre	Sita Buslines	Scrapped 27 July 2014, replaced by routes 420 & 423
454	Sunshine Sunshine West	Sita Buslines	Scrapped 27 July 2014, replaced by routes 427 & 428
461	Watergardens station via Hume Drive Caroline Springs	CDC Melbourne	Ceased 4 October 2026, replaced by extended route 463 and new route 464.
475	Moonee Ponds Junction via Niddrie Keilor East	Kastoria Bus Lines	Ceased 11 July 2020, replaced by routes 469 and 476
493	Williams Landing station via Point Cook Town Centre East Werribee	CDC Melbourne	Commenced 28 April 2013, ceased 21 June 2015
500	Broadmeadows via Melbourne Airport Sunbury	Tullamarine Bus Lines	Scrapped 27 July 2014
501	Moonee Ponds Junction via Strathmore Niddrie	Kastoria Bus Lines	Ceased 11 July 2020, replaced by route 469
520	Doreen via Yarrambat Greensborough	Dysons	Ceased 24 July 2016, replaced by routes 381 (Doreen section) and 385 (Greensborough section)
547	Kew La Trobe University, Bundoora	Ivanhoe Bus Company	Section incorporated into route 548
560	Greensborough via Bundoora, Keon Park station Broadmeadows	East West Bus Company	Incorporated into route 902 on 5 April 2010
562	Whittlesea via South Morang station, Mill Park, Bundoora Northland Shopping Centre	Dysons	Ceased 24 July 2016, replaced by route 382
565	Greensborough Greensborough North East	Dysons	Incorporated into route 563
565	Kinglake via Humevale Whittlesea	Dysons	Ceased 24 July 2016, replaced by route 384
568	Northland Shopping Centre via North Watsonia Greensborough	Dysons	Incorporated into route 566
571	Epping South Morang	East West Bus Company	TrainLink service. Initially operated from South Morang to Campbellfield (Hume Highway). Extended to Roxburgh Park station in October 2007, replacing route 571A. Truncated to Epping and partly replaced by extension of SmartBus 901 in September 2010. Ceased 22 April 2012 with the opening of the South Morang rail extension
571A	Roxburgh Park Epping	East West Bus Company	Incorporated into route 571 in October 2007 with the opening of Roxburgh Park station
572	University Hill via Mill Park Stables Shopping Centre, South Morang station, Mernda Doreen	Dysons	Ceased 24 July 2016, replaced by routes 386 and 387
573	University Hill Mill Park Lakes/Palisades	Dysons	Ceased 24 July 2016, replaced by route 383
575	Epping North Thomastown	Dysons	Ceased 24 July 2016, replaced by routes 356, 357, and 358
581	Eltham Research	Panorama Coaches	Shortworking of routes 578 & 579
615	Box Hill station Balwyn North	Quince's Scenicruisers	Incorporated into route 284
627	Elsternwick Brighton East	Driver Bus Lines	Ceased 27 September 2010, split and simplified into: routes 625 (Elsternwick – Chadstone via Oakleigh) and 626 (Middle Brighton station – Chadstone via Carnegie)
634	Middle Brighton Lilydale	Quince's Scenicruisers	Split up between: route 703 (Middle Brighton – Monash University section), route 631 (Monash University – Waverley Gardens Shopping Centre section), route 691 (Waverley Gardens – Boronia section), route 737 (Boronia – Croydon section), route 664 (Croydon – Chirnside Park/Lilydale section)
665	Ringwood Dandenong	Invicta Bus Services	Incorporated into route 901 on 24 March 2008
673	Lilydale station via Lilydale Nursing Home Lillydale Lake	Ventura Bus Lines	Ceased 29 January 2022
676	Lilydale via Lilydale East	Ventura Bus Lines	Circular route, ceased 2 October 2021 and replaced by FlexiRide services
686	Healesville via Badger Creek & Healesville Sanctuary	McKenzie's Tourist Services	Loop service, ceased 24 November 2023, replaced by route 685
687	Healesville via Chum Creek & Mount Lebanon	McKenzie's Tourist Services	Loop service, ceased 24 November 2023 due to low patronage
700	Box Hill station Mordialloc	Ventura Bus Lines	SmartBus route, incorporated into route 903 on 20 April 2009, Mordialloc – Chelsea extension reverted to route 706
731	Camberwell Balwyn North	Quince's Scenicruisers	Incorporated into route 285
768	Box Hill station Deakin University	Ventura Bus Lines	Operated on university days only, ceased October 2023
769	Karingal Hub Shopping Centre Frankston	Peninsula Bus Lines	Sunday service only, incorporated into routes 770, 771, and 777
786	Rye St Andrews Beach	Ventura Bus Lines	Abolished 5 July 2026
794	Cranbourne Pearcedale	Cranbourne Transit	Trial service by the City of Casey, route scrapped 4 February 2007
797	Cranbourne Town Service via Cranbourne station	Cranbourne Transit	Loop service in Cranbourne, limited services, ceased 13 November 2016
801	Dandenong Keysborough	Grenda's Bus Services	Scrapped
815	Dandenong Noble Park	Ventura Bus Lines	Ceased 27 November 2021, replaced with sections of routes 813 and 816
821	Westfield Southland Clayton	Ventura Bus Lines	Ceased 3 December 2023, removed due to overlap with route 631
826	Hampton via Westfield Southland, Westfield Fountain Gate Pakenham	Grenda's Bus Services	Incorporated into route 828 between Hampton & Berwick, replaced by Route 926 between Westfield Fountain Gate & Pakenham
830	Dandenong Frankston	Grenda's Bus Services	Incorporated into routes 832, 833 & 901 on 24 March 2008
831	Dandenong Frankston	Grenda's Bus Services	Incorporated into routes 832, 833 & 901 on 24 March 2008
849	Dandenong via Gleneagles Dr Mossgiel Park	Ventura Bus Lines	Ceased 31 May 2020, replaced by routes 843 and 845
886	Rosebud Chisholm TAFE – Rosebud Campus	Ventura Bus Lines	Ceased 18 February 2022, replaced by FlexiRide services
888	Nunawading via Edithvale Chelsea	Grenda's Bus Services	SmartBus route, incorporated into route 902 on 5 April 2010, Edithvale section replaced by route 858
889	Nunawading via Chelsea Heights Chelsea	Grenda's Bus Services	SmartBus route, incorporated into route 902 on 5 April 2010, Chelsea Heights section replaced by route 858
896	Cranbourne station Cranbourne East	Cranbourne Transit	TrainLink service, ceased 13 November 2016

== List of routes by bus operator ==
Routes by bus company
Image	Operator	Routes	Notes
	Cranbourne Transit	789, 790, 791, 792, 795, 796, 798, 799, 881, 890, 891, 892, 893, 894, 895, 897, 898	Formerly known as FA Phillips Bus Service. Owned by Pulitano Group.
	CDC Melbourne	150, 151, 153, 160, 161, 166, 167, 170, 180, 181, 182, 190, 191, 192, 400, 406, 407, 408, 409, 410, 411, 412, 414, 415, 417, 418, 419, 421, 423, 424, 425, 439, 441, 443, 461, 465, 467, 468, 477, 478, 479, 482, 484, 490, 494, 495, 496, 497, 498, 501, 511, 524, 528, 529, 530, 531, 532, 533, 534, 536, 537, 538, 540, 541, 542, 543, 544, 601, 605, 606, 612, 623, 624, 625, 626, 630, 900	Subsidiary of ComfortDelGro Australia
	Kinetic Melbourne	200, 207, 215, 216, 219, 220, 223, 232, 234, 235, 236, 237, 246, 250, 251, 270, 271, 273, 279, 280, 281, 282, 284, 285, 293, 295, 301, 302, 303, 304, 305, 309, 318, 343, 350, 356, 357, 358, 364, 370, 381, 382, 383, 384, 385, 386, 387, 388, 389, 426, 503, 504, 505, 506, 508, 509, 510, 512, 513, 517, 518, 525, 546, 552, 553, 554, 555, 556, 557, 558, 559, 561, 564, 566, 567, 569, 570, 577, 578, 579, 580, 582, 600, 603, 604, 609, 668, 669, 901, 902, 903, 905, 906, 907, 908, 922, 923	
	Martyrs Bus Service	683	Owned by Dineen Group
	McKenzie's Tourist Services	684, 685	Owned by Dineen Group
	SkyBus	Melbourne Airport – City, Avalon Airport - City, Melbourne Airport – Frankston, Melbourne Airport – Box Hill, Melbourne Airport – Sunshine	Owned by Kinetic Group
Bus at Sunbury station	Sunbury Bus Service	475, 481, 483, 485, 486, 487, 488, 489	Owned by Donric Group
	Transit Systems Victoria	241, 400, 402, 404, 420, 422, 427, 428, 431, 432, 453, 455, 456, 457, 458, 459, 471, 472	Owned by Transit Systems. Formerly known as Sita Buslines.
	Ventura Bus Lines	201, 526, 527, 548, 549, 550, 551, 631, 663, 664, 670, 671, 672, 673, 675, 676, 677, 679, 680, 681, 682, 688, 689, 691, 693, 690, 694, 695, 696, 697, 699, 701, 703, 704, 705, 706, 708, 709, 732, 733, 734, 735, 736, 737, 738, 740, 742, 745, 753, 754, 755, 757, 758, 765, 766, 767, 770, 771, 772, 773, 774, 775, 776, 777, 778, 779, 780, 781, 782, 783, 784, 785, 786, 787, 788, 800, 802, 804, 811, 812, 813, 814, 816, 821, 822, 823, 824, 825, 828, 831, 832, 833, 834, 835, 836, 837, 838, 839, 841, 842, 843, 844, 845, 846, 847, 848, 849, 850, 857, 858, 861, 862, 863, 885, 886, 887, 888, 889, 899, 900, 925, 926, 927, 928, 929, 966, 968	
