= Night Network (Melbourne) =

Public transport system in Melbourne, Australia

Overview
- Owner: Public Transport Victoria
- Locale: Melbourne
- Number of lines: Melbourne suburban railway lines, 6 tram lines, 21 bus routes, 4 regional coaches
- Website: ptv.vic.gov.au/getting-around/night-network/

Operation
- Began operation: 1 January 2016
- Operators: Night Train: Metro; Night Tram: Yarra Trams; Night Bus: Dysons, McKenzie's, Ventura and Kinetic Melbourne; Night Coach: V/Line

Night Network is Melbourne's weekend overnight public transport system, which commenced operation on 1 January 2016 for a 12-month trial, which was later extended by six-months, and made permanent in April 2017. It comprises all of Melbourne's regular electric railway lines, six tram lines, 21 night bus services, and five regional coach services. The night bus services replaced the previous NightRider services, with 10 operating radial from the CBD and the remaining 11 operating from suburban railway stations. It operates every Friday and Saturday night, as well as on selected public holidays.

== History ==
In January 2014, in the lead up to the 2014 Victorian State election, the Australian Labor Party promised to commence a trial of all night public transport on weekends, dubbed Homesafe, if elected. Following the Australian Labor Party's victory, cost overruns were announced in August 2015, with the plan to cost $83.6 million, not the $50 million estimated during the election, due to increased security costs. The network was unveiled on 30 October 2015, along with its new name, Night Network, with the Minister for Public Transport Jacinta Allan claiming 70% of Melbourne's dwellings would be covered by Night Network.

Night Network commenced operation on 1 January 2016 on a 12-month trial basis. In its first weekend of operation 9,862 myki touch ons were recorded, representing a three-fold increase in patronage compared to the former NightRider bus system. However, this may understate patronage as it fails to account for fare evaders, those travelling in the free tram zone, and those with periodical tickets who may not have touched on. The trial was later extended until June 2017, and made permanent in April 2017.

== Night Network services ==
=== Night Train ===
All of Melbourne's train services operated by Metro Trains Melbourne, except the Flemington Racecourse and Stony Point lines, operate as part of Night Network, servicing all metropolitan stations except for City Loop and Metro Tunnel stations (besides Town Hall) and Southern Cross, which close at midnight and 1am respectively. Trains operate hourly on all lines, with some lines operating as shuttles from major interchange stations.

=== Night Tram ===
The following routes operate overnight to half-hour frequencies. The Free Tram Zone remains in operation during Night Network operating times.

- : North Coburg – Flinders Street station (City)
- : Melbourne University – Carnegie
- : Vermont South – Central Pier
- : Waterfront City (Docklands) – Bundoora RMIT
- : St Kilda Beach – East Brunswick
- : Port Melbourne – Box Hill

=== Night Bus ===
Twenty-one night bus services, operated by CDC Melbourne, Dysons, Kinetic Melbourne, Transit Systems Victoria and Ventura Bus Lines, run to a 24-hour weekend service on Fridays and Saturdays, as part of Night Network. Thirteen routes operate on Fridays and Saturdays. Night Bus replaced NightRider bus services, which largely follow railway lines, with PTV claiming most passengers will still have access to all night public transport.

| N° | From | To | Via | Notes |
|---|---|---|---|---|
| 150 | Williams Landing station | Tarneit station | Tarneit | |
| 180 | Werribee station | Tarneit station | Werribee | |
| 190 | Werribee station | Wyndham Vale station | Wyndham Vale | |
| 207 | City (Queen Street) | Doncaster Shopping Centre | Kew and Doncaster Road | |
| 250 | City (Queen Street) | La Trobe University | Westgarth, Ivanhoe | |
| 357 | Thomastown station | Wollert West | Epping | |
| 386 | Mernda station | Bundoora RMIT | South Morang and Mill Park | |
| 406 | Keilor East | Footscray station | Maribyrnong | |
| 410 | Sunshine station | Footscray station | Maidstone | |
| 420 | Sunshine station | Watergardens station | Deer Park | |
| 630 | Elwood | Monash University | Ormond and Huntingdale | |
| 670 | Ringwood station | Lilydale station | Croydon and Chirnside Park | |
| 693 | Scoresby | Oakleigh station | Ferntree Gully Road | Scoresby – Belgrave does not operate during night network |
| 703 | Middle Brighton station | Blackburn station | Bentleigh and Clayton | |
| 788 | Frankston station | Sorrento | Dromana and Rosebud | Portsea – Sorrento does not operate during night network |
| 833 | Frankston station | Carrum station | Carrum Downs | |
| 900 | Oakleigh station | Stud Park Shopping Centre | Wellington Road | Caulfield – Oakleigh does not operate during night network |
| 901 | Ringwood station | Dandenong station | Wantirna and Rowville | Frankston – Dandenong and Ringwood – Melbourne Airport does not operate during night network |
| 905 | City (King Street) | The Pines Shopping Centre | Collingwood, Eastern Freeway and Templestowe | |
| 907 | King Street | Mitcham station | Collingwood, Eastern Freeway and Doncaster Road | |
| 908 | Doncaster Park & Ride | The Pines Shopping Centre | Templestowe Lower | |
| 941 | Sunshine station | Watergardens station | Sunshine North, Taylors Lakes and Keilor Downs | Night network only service |
| 943 | Watergardens station | Melton | Caroline Springs | Night network only service |
| 947 | Footscray station | Newport station | Geelong Road | Night network only service |
| 949 | Williams Landing station | Altona Meadows | Point Cook | One-way operation, Night network only service |
| 951 | Brunswick station | Glenroy station | Brunswick West and Pascoe Vale | Night network only service |
| 953 | Broadmeadows station | Craigieburn | Meadow Heights and Roxburgh Park | Night network only service |
| 959 | City (Queen Street) | Broadmeadows station | Moonee Ponds, Airport West and Gladstone Park | Night network only service |
| 965 | Lilydale station | Lilydale station | Woori Yallock, Healesville and Mount Evelyn | Night network only service |
| 967 | Glen Waverley station | Bayswater station | Burwood Highway | Returns via Bayswater North and Ferntree Gully, Night network only service |
| 978 | Clayton station | Dandenong station | Mulgrave | Night network only service |
| 979 | Clayton station | Dandenong station | Keysborough | Night network only service |
| 981 | Dandenong station | Cranbourne | Berwick and Narre Warren South | Night network only service |
| 982 | Dandenong station | Cranbourne | Endeavour Hills and Hampton Park | Night network only service |
Source: Public Transport Victoria

=== Night Coach ===
V/Line operate Night Coach services to Ballarat, Bendigo, Traralgon, and Geelong, departing Southern Cross station at approximately 2am. The coaches operate in lieu of regional trains, servicing railway stations along said routes. In October 2016, Seymour was added to the network.

== Ticketing ==
Myki tickets are valid for Night Network services, with standard fares applying, while V/Line tickets are charged at off-peak rates. Authorised Officers patrol Night Network, checking for fare evasion.
