= NightRider (bus service) =

Network of bus services in Melbourne, Australia

Overview
- Owner: Public Transport Victoria
- Locale: Melbourne
- Transit type: Bus
- Number of lines: 13
- Website: www.ptv.vic.gov.au/route/nightrider

Operation
- Began operation: May 1993
- Ended operation: 27 December 2015
- Operators: Dysons; McKenzie's Tourist Services; Ventura Bus Lines
- Headway: 30 minutes

The NightRider was a network of bus services in Melbourne, Australia. It operated on weekends and for special events from the Melbourne central business district to the outer suburbs on 13 routes, with over 300 stops between 01:30 (00:00 on the Doncaster route) and 04:30 on Saturdays and 05:30 on Sundays. NightRider ceased operation on 27 December 2015, being replaced by Night Network's Night Bus services which commenced operation in 2016.

== History ==
The NightRider network was launched in May 1993 with nine routes all originating on Swanston Street. They were the first night routes in Melbourne after the Melbourne & Metropolitan Tramways Board withdrew its services in the 1960s.

In November 2008, the NightRider network was overhauled. The logo and branding were replaced, and operators of several routes changed. New routes commenced to Doncaster, Healesville and Cranbourne. Frequencies were increased from 60 to 30 minutes. Due to Metro Trains Melbourne now running until 01:00, the first services were revised to depart at 01:30 instead of 00:30 on most services.

Route numbers were issued by Metlink for the first time (previously some operators did display them on buses) and are all in the 900 series, with the numbers corresponding to the predominant route number allocations at the outer termini. For example, many buses in the Dandenong area were in the 800s, hence the number 980 and 981 was allocated to them.

Originally fares were set at a flat $5 regardless of distance travelled. From March 2007 standard Metcard tickets were adopted for use on the service.

Buses were labelled with a large NightRider logo, and text saying "NightRider – The after midnight bus service".

== Routes ==
Buses ran half hourly from 01:30 (00:00 on Doncaster route 961) to 04:30 on Saturdays and 05:30 on Sundays on the following routes:

Route	From	To	Via	Operator
942	City	St Albans	Footscray, Sunshine & Deer Park	Dysons
943	Deer Park	Melton	Rockbank	Dysons
944	City	Werribee	Spotswood, Newport & Hoppers Crossing	Dysons
954	City	Craigieburn	Moonee Ponds, Essendon & Broadmeadows	Dysons
956	City	Epping	Brunswick, Coburg & Preston	Dysons
958	City	Eltham	Fitzroy, Northcote & Heidelberg	Dysons
961	City	Doncaster	Bulleen & Templestowe	Dysons
965	Lilydale	Healesville	Yarra Glen& Woori Yallock	McKenzie's Tourist Services
966	City	Croydon	Balwyn, Box Hill & Lilydale	Ventura Bus Lines
968	City	Belgrave	South Yarra, Glen Waverley & Westfield Knox	Ventura Bus Lines
970	City	Mornington	St Kilda, Mentone & Frankston	Ventura Bus Lines
980	City	Dandenong	Prahran, Monash University & Springvale	Ventura Bus Lines
981	Dandenong	Cranbourne	Narre Warren, Berwick & Hampton Park	Ventura Bus Lines
