= National Bus Company =

National Bus Company may refer to:

- National Bus Company (Australia), Australian bus company that operated between 1993 and 2013
- National Bus Company (UK), British bus company that operated between 1969 and 1988
