= National Bus Company (Australia) =

Former Australian bus operator

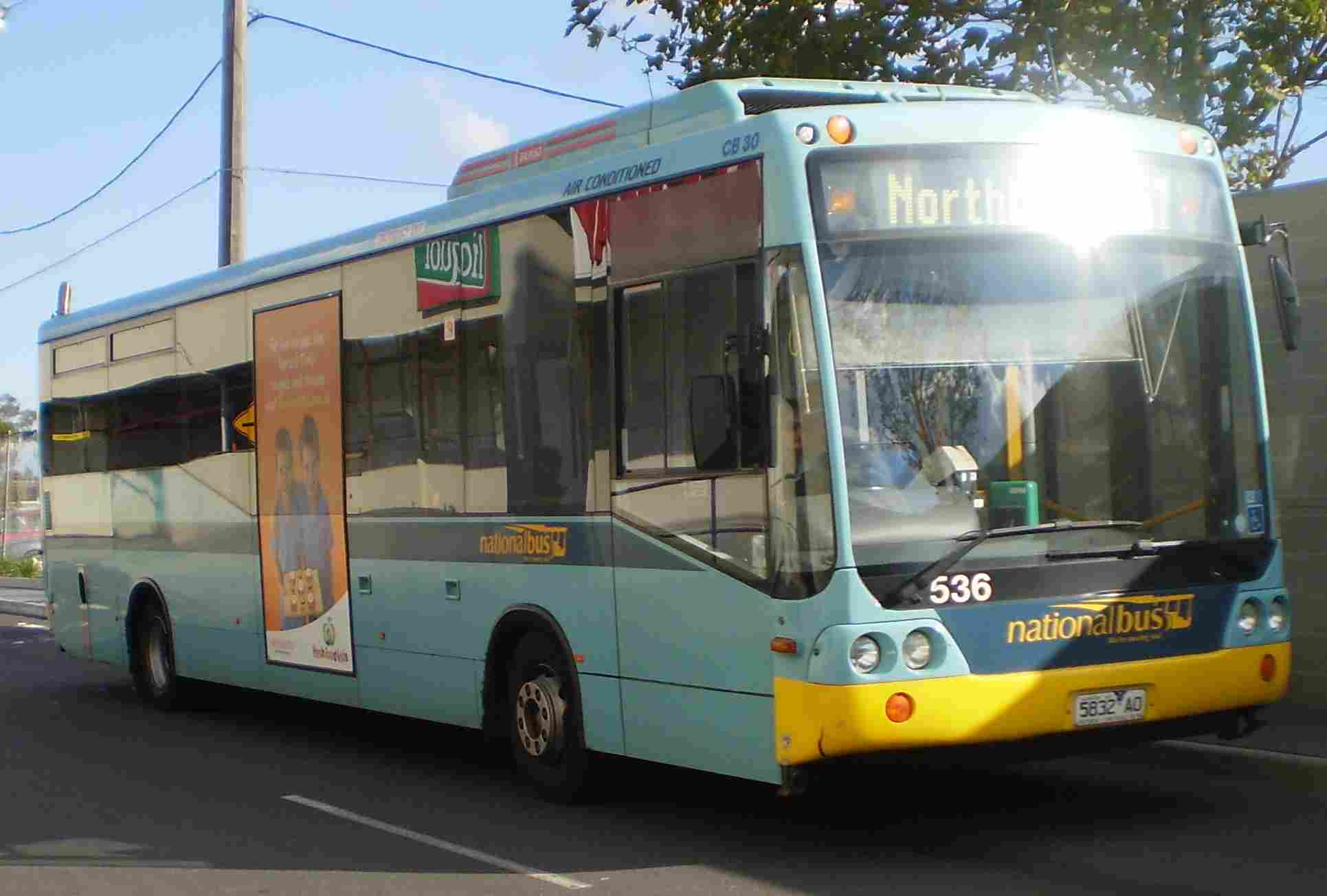
- Custom Coaches bodied MAN 15.220 in the Ventura Bus Lines style livery
- Parent: Ventura Bus Lines
- Commenced operation: 27 December 1993
- Ceased operation: 3 August 2013
- Service area: North, North-East, Eastern Melbourne
- Service type: Bus services
- Routes: 41
- Destinations: Bulleen; Kew Junction; Warrandyte
- Hubs: Deakin University; Doncaster Park & Ride; La Trobe University; Northland Shopping Centre; The Pines Shopping Centre, Templestowe Village Shopping Centre; Westfield Doncaster
- Stations: Box Hill; Canterbury; Croydon; Mitcham; Ringwood
- Depots: Fitzroy North; Doncaster; Croydon
- Website: www.venturabus.com.au

National Bus Company was an Australian bus operator in Melbourne until August 2013. It also formerly operated buses in Brisbane between August 1997 and September 2004.

At the time of cessation, it was a subsidiary of Ventura Bus Lines.

== History ==
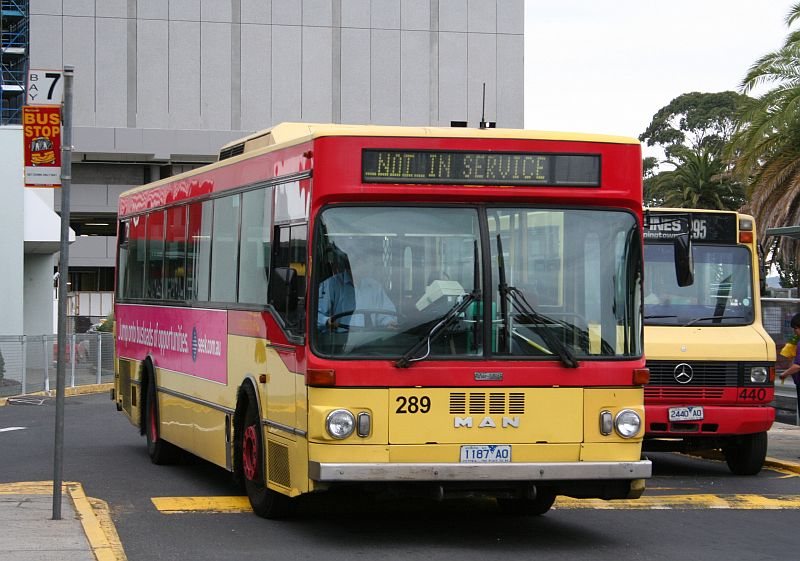
Ansair bodied MAN SL200 and Newnham Custom bodied Mercedes-Benz LO812 at Westfield Doncaster in March 2008

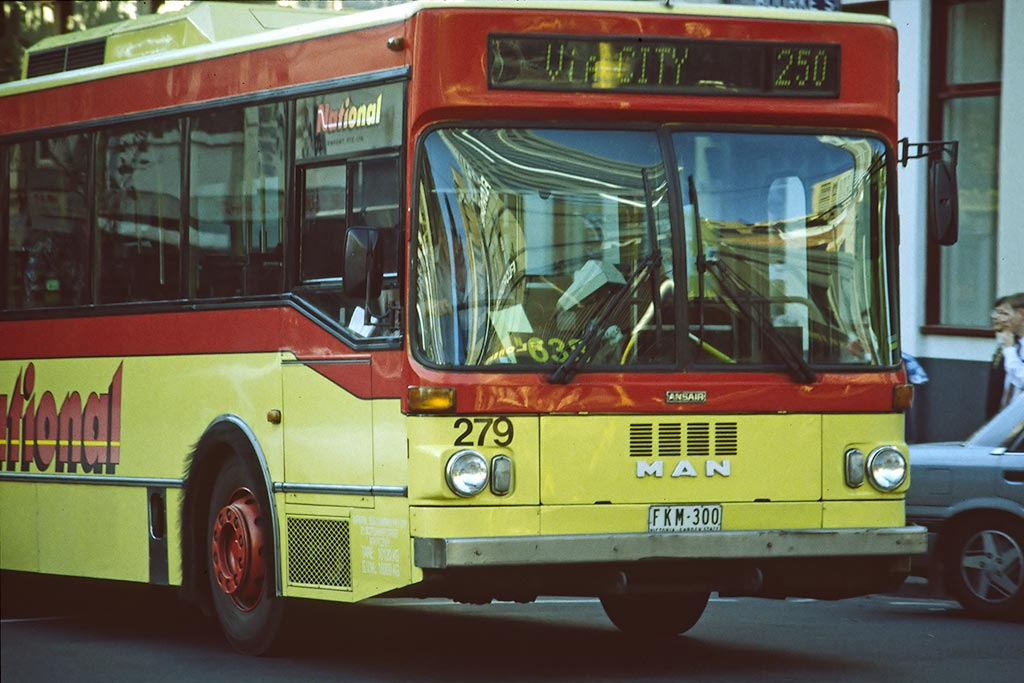
Ansair bodied MAN SL200 in 1997

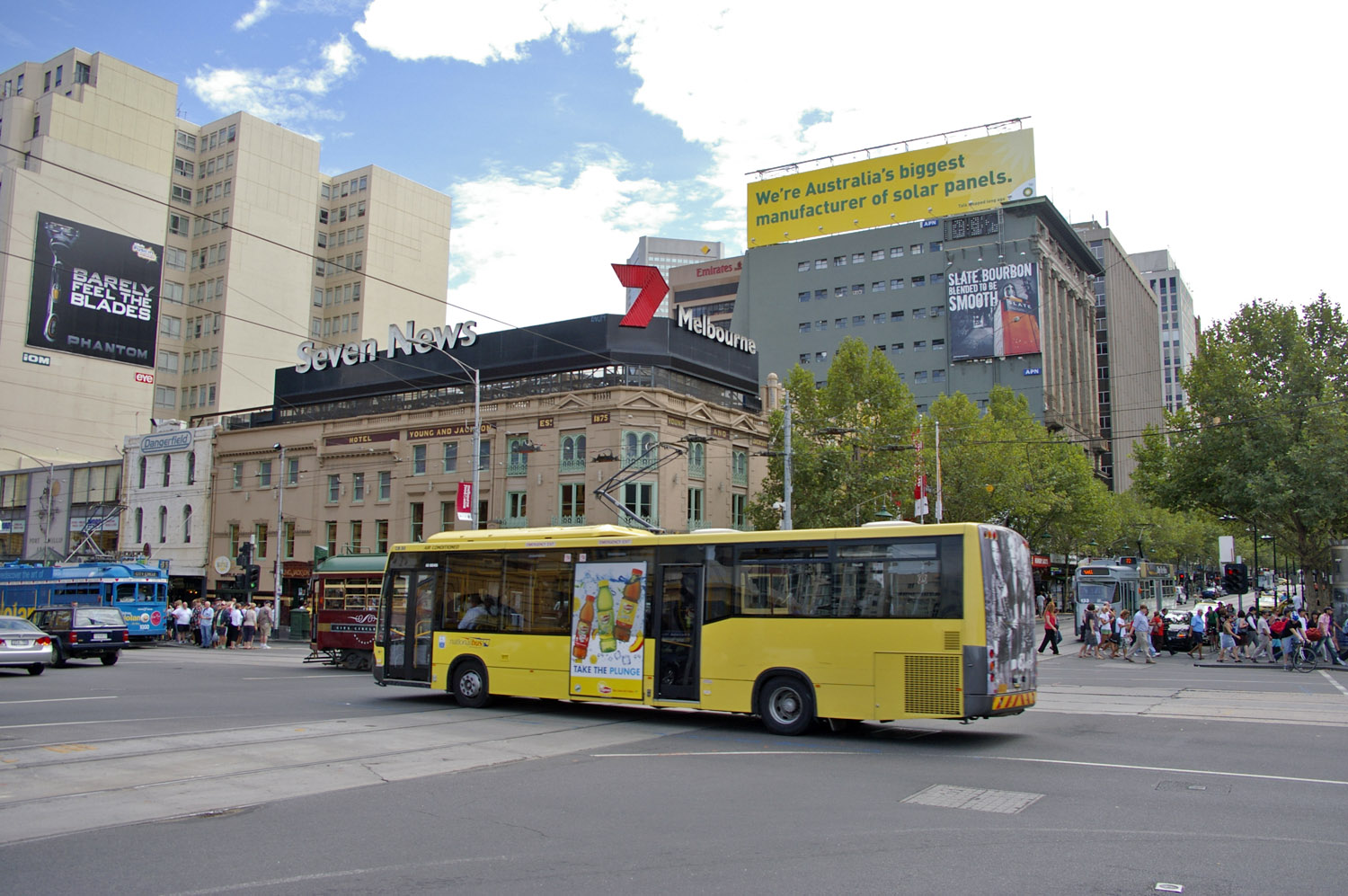
Custom Coaches bodied MAN 15.220 outside Flinders Street station in February 2008

In 1993 the Kennett state government put the state owned Public Transport Corporation services up for privatisation. The tender was won by Jim Bosnjak and sister in law Carol, who together held 57% of the shares in Sydney operator Westbus.

National Bus Company commenced operations on 27 December 1993 with a fleet of 61 Volvo B59 and 170 MAN SL200 former Public Transport Corporation buses and two depots located at Doncaster and Fitzroy North.

National Bus Company placed an order for 157 Newnham Custom bodied Mercedes-Benz LO812 and O405 buses. The LO812s were introduced under National's plan to introduce bus services in local areas previously not serviced by bus routes, along the lines of the Nepean Nipper scheme introduced in 1993 by Westbus in Penrith, the O405s were to replace older buses inherited from the Public Transport Corporation.

In August 1997 National Bus Company purchased the services of Bayside Buslines, Capalaba from Geoff Todd, marking the beginning of its Brisbane operations.

In May 1999 National Bus Company was purchased by National Express. Included in the purchase is its main subsidiary, Bosnjak Holdings, which owned Jim and Carol's 57% shareholding of Westbus. After the purchase, Jim Bosnjak continued to be Chairman of National Bus Company.

In September 2004, National Express sold the Brisbane operations to Connex, and the Melbourne operations to Ventura Bus Lines. At this time the Melbourne operations operated 268 buses along 44 northern and eastern suburbs bus routes. The National Bus Company branding and logo were retained by Ventura for the Melbourne operations, while the Brisbane operations were rebranded Connex Brisbane, now known as Transdev Queensland. The rest of the operation would go on to collapse into voluntary administration and become ComfortDelGro Australia.

In April 2013 Transdev Melbourne won the tender to operate the Melbourne Metropolitan Bus Franchise from August 2013. The franchise operates 30% of Melbourne's services including those of National Bus Company. National Bus Company ceased operating on 3 August 2013. At the time of cessation, National Bus Company operated 276 buses from Doncaster East and Fitzroy North depots.

=== Livery ===
Upon formation in 1993, National Bus Company adopted the same cream and red colours as related company Westbus. It later adopted an all yellow livery used by Westbus. The Melbourne bus fleet began to adopt the two shades of blue of Ventura Bus Lines in 2004.

== See also ==
- Buses in Melbourne
- List of Victorian Bus Companies
- List of bus routes in Melbourne
