= Berwick railway station, Melbourne =

Railway station in Melbourne, Australia

Berwick
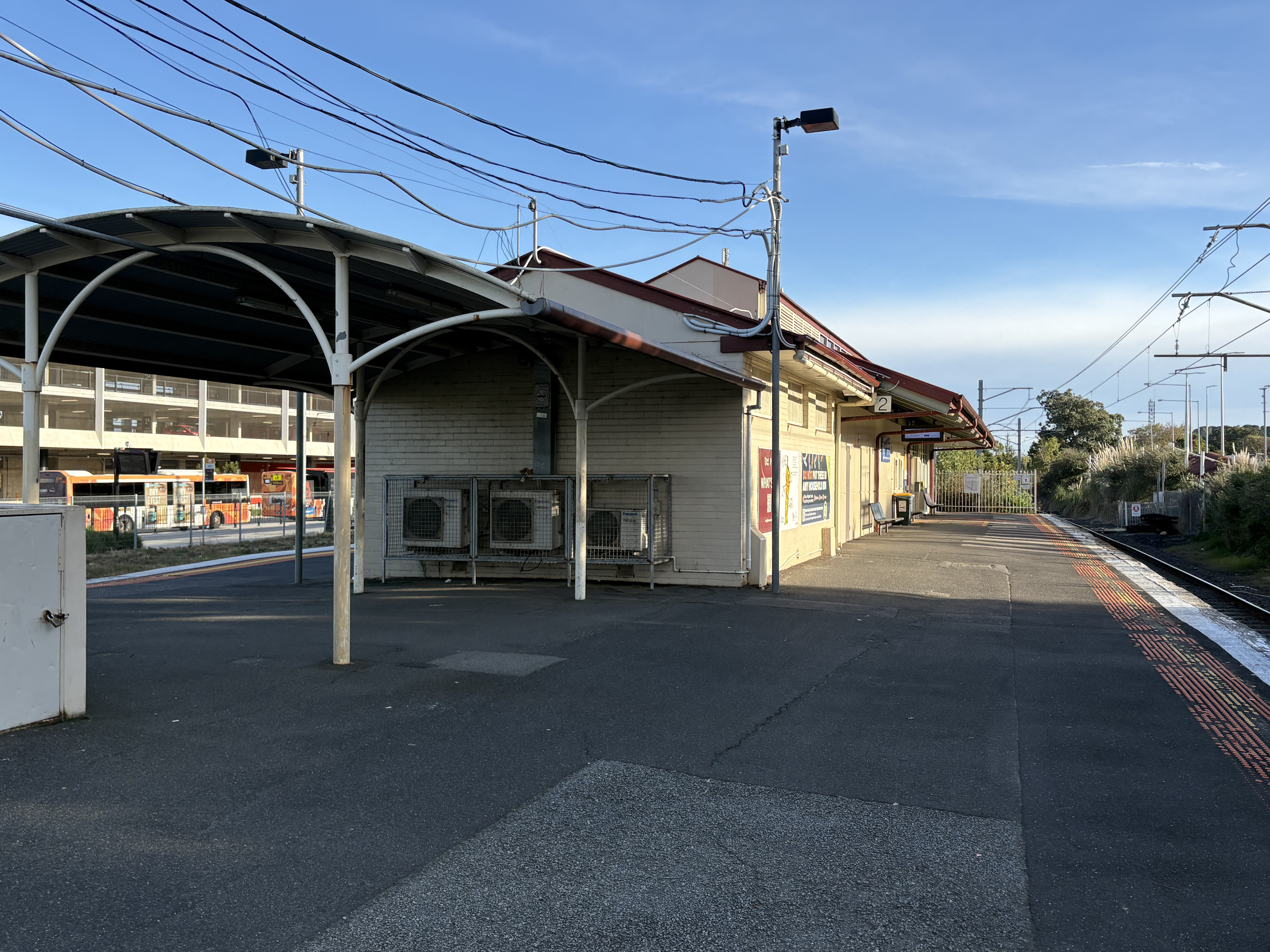
- Westbound view of the island platform and station building, May 2026

General information
- Location: Clyde Road, Berwick, Victoria 3806; City of Casey; Australia
- Coordinates: 38°02′23″S 145°20′42″E
- System: PTV commuter and regional rail station
- Owner: VicTrack
- Operator: Metro Trains
- Lines: Pakenham; Gippsland
- Distance: 44.58 kilometres from Southern Cross
- Platforms: 2 (1 island)
- Tracks: 2
- Train operators: Metro Trains; V/Line
- Connections: Bus

Construction
- Structure type: At-grade
- Parking: 775 spaces
- Cycle facilities: Available
- Accessible: Yes — step free access

Other information
- Status: Operational, premium station
- Station code: BEW
- Fare zone: Myki zone 2
- Website: Public Transport Victoria

History
- Opened: 8 October 1877; 148 years ago
- Electrified: July 1954 (1500 V DC overhead)

Passengers
- 2005–2006: 522,065
- 2006–2007: 600,845 ▲15.09%
- 2007–2008: 682,870 ▲13.65%
- 2008–2009: 750,368 ▲9.88%
- 2009–2010: 776,349 ▲3.46%
- 2010–2011: 848,874 ▲9.34%
- 2011–2012: 890,924 ▲4.95%
- 2012–2013: Not measured
- 2013–2014: 827,436 ▼7.12%
- 2014–2015: 873,844 ▲5.6%
- 2015–2016: 993,438 ▲13.68%
- 2016–2017: 982,755 ▼1.07%
- 2017–2018: 917,879 ▼6.6%
- 2018–2019: 864,810 ▼5.78%
- 2019–2020: 754,550 ▼12.75%
- 2020–2021: 361,200 ▼52.13%
- 2021–2022: 325,600 ▼9.85%
- 2022–2023: 697,250 ▲114.14%
- 2023–2024: 948,200 ▲35.99%
- 2024–2025: 1,008,200 ▲6.33%

Services
Preceding station	Metro Trains	Following station
Narre Warren towards Watergardens or Sunbury via Metro Tunnel	Pakenham line	Beaconsfield towards East Pakenham
Preceding station	V/Line	Following station
Dandenong towards Southern Cross	Gippsland line (Once every Mon-Fri)	Pakenham towards Traralgon
Track layout
Location

Berwick station is a railway station operated by Metro Trains Melbourne and V/Line on the Pakenham and Gippsland lines, part of the Melbourne and Victorian rail networks. It serves the south-eastern suburb of Berwick, in Melbourne, Victoria, Australia. Berwick station is a ground-level premium station, featuring an island platform. It opened on 8 October 1877.

== History ==
Berwick station opened on 8 October 1877, when the railway line from Dandenong was extended to Pakenham. Like the suburb itself, the station was named after Berwick-upon-Tweed, Northumberland, England, the birthplace of Robert Gardiner, who was an early leaseholder in the area.

In 1956, the line between Berwick and Officer was duplicated, with a signal panel also installed at the station in that year. In 1962, duplication between Berwick and Narre Warren was provided.

In 1970, flashing light signals were provided at the former Clyde Road level crossing, which was located nearby in the up direction of the station. On 12 October 1982, at around 11:15am, Hitachi carriage 137M, leading a Dandenong – Pakenham shuttle service, collided with a semi-trailer at the level crossing. The collision derailed 137M, flipping it on its side. Eleven people were injured in the collision. 137M was later withdrawn due to the collision.

In 1986, boom barriers were provided at the former level crossing. During September 1988, the former No. 2 and No. 3 roads were removed. In December of that year, a number of points and signals were abolished.

In 1998, Berwick was upgraded to a premium station.

On 1 December 2018, the signal panel was abolished.

In February 2022, the Clyde Road level crossing was grade separated, as part of the Level Crossing Removal Project. The level crossing was removed by building a road underpass beneath the railway line. The grade separation works also included upgrading the bus interchange at the station. On 21 February of that year, Clyde Road reopened to vehicular traffic.

== Platforms and services ==
Berwick has one island platform with two faces. It is serviced by Metro Trains' Pakenham line services, as well as selected V/Line Traralgon services.

=== Metropolitan ===
Berwick platform arrangement
Platform	Line	Destination	Via	Service Pattern	Source
1	Pakenham line	Sunbury, Watergardens, West Footscray	Town Hall	Limited express	
2	Pakenham line	East Pakenham		All stations	

=== Regional ===
Berwick platform arrangement
Platform	Line	Destination	Via	Notes
1	Gippsland line	Southern Cross	Flinders Street	One morning peak service.
2	Gippsland line	Traralgon, Bairnsdale		One evening peak service.

== Transport links ==
Ventura Bus Lines operates thirteen routes via Berwick station, under contract to Public Transport Victoria:

- 828 : to Hampton station
- 831 : to Kingsmere Estate (Berwick)
- 834 : to Westfield Fountain Gate (via Berwick North)
- 835 : to Westfield Fountain Gate (via Narre Warren)
- 836 : to Eden Rise Shopping Centre
- 837 : to Beaconsfield East
- 838 : Emerald – Westfield Fountain Gate
- 839 : to Berwick North
- 846 : to Eden Rise Shopping Centre
- 847 : to The Avenue Village Shopping Centre (Cranbourne North)
- 888 : to Clyde
- 889 : to Clyde North
- 899 : to The Avenue Village Shopping Centre (Cranbourne North)
- 928 : to Pakenham station (via Cardinia Road station)
