= Bus Queensland =

Australian bus and coach operator

- Parent: Pulitano Group
- Founded: April 2009
- Headquarters: Wilsonton
- Service area: Toowoomba
- Routes: 9
- Hubs: Toowoomba CBD; Toowoomba Hospital; University of Southern Queensland
- Depots: 1
- Fleet: 80 (October 2021)
- Website: www.busqld.com.au

Bus Queensland is a privately owned bus operator in Queensland and a subsidiary of the Pulitano Group, established in 2003. The company operates urban, school and charter services in South East Queensland, including Ipswich, Toowoomba, Park Ridge and the Lockyer Valley.

The company was formed in April 2009 following the acquisition of Garden City Sunbus and Kynoch Coaches. It formerly operated long-distance coach services across regional Queensland until those contracts were transferred to other operators in December 2021.

== History ==
=== Formation ===
Bus Queensland was established in April 2009 when the Pulitano Group purchased the operations of Kynoch Coaches and Garden City Sunbus.

Kynoch Coaches was a family-owned operator based in Stephen Street, Toowoomba, providing urban, school and long-distance services prior to its acquisition.

Garden City Sunbus was formed in September 2003 as a division of Sunbus after Hagan’s City Bus relinquished its operating licence following unsuccessful negotiations with Queensland Transport regarding subsidy increases.

=== Long-distance operations ===
Bus Queensland operated a network of long-distance coach services from Toowoomba to Cunnamulla, Lightning Ridge and Rockhampton. In January 2015, further contracts commenced for services from Brisbane to Charleville and Mount Isa and from Townsville to Mount Isa.

On 10 December 2021, Bus Queensland’s remaining long-distance service contracts were transferred to other operators, including Greyhound Australia, Murrays, and Trans North Bus & Coach.

== Fleet ==
As at October 2021, the fleet consisted of 80 buses and coaches.
