= Pulitano Group =

Australian bus and coach operator

- Parent: Pulitano family
- Founded: 2003
- Service area: Brisbane; Laidley; Melbourne; Snowy Mountains; Toowoomba
- Service type: Bus & coach operator
- Depots: Cranbourne; Ipswich; Laidley; Mansfield; Park Ridge; Toowoomba
- Fleet: 406 (May 2013)
- Website: www.busqld.com.au www.cranbournetransit.com.au www.mmbl.com.au

The Pulitano Group is an Australian operator of buses and coaches in Queensland and Victoria.

== History ==
The Pulitano Group was formed in 2003 when the various bus interests of the Pulitano family bus enterprise (Established in 1972) were combined.

In Victoria the Pulitanos operated Australian Coach Travel, Cranbourne Transit, Mansfield-Mount Buller Bus Lines, Northern Bus Lines and US Bus Lines, and in Queensland Park Ridge Transit and Westside Bus Company. In July 2008 Northern Bus Lines was sold to Dysons and in December 2009 US Bus Lines was sold to Ventura Bus Lines.

In 2009 Kynoch Coaches and Sunbus Toowoomba were purchased and merged to form Bus Queensland Toowoomba. It has since purchased Laidley Bus Service. All of Pulitano Group's Queensland operations operate under the Bus Queensland brand.

== Fleet ==
As at May 2013 it operated 284 buses in Queensland and 122 in Victoria.

== See also ==
- List of Victorian Bus Companies
- List of Melbourne bus routes
- Buses in Melbourne
