= Pacific Werribee =

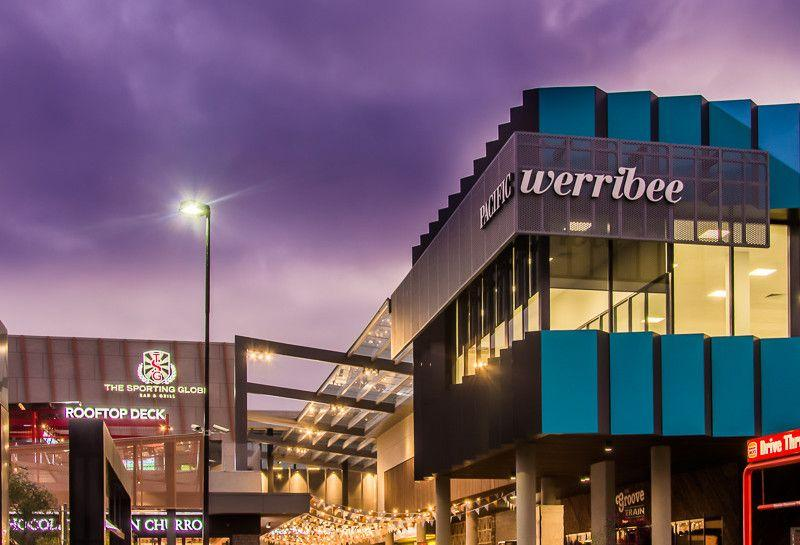
- Location: Hoppers Crossing
- Coordinates: 37°52′31″S 144°40′47″E
- Address: Cnr Derrimut Rd & Heaths Rd, Hoppers Crossing
- Opened: 1985; 41 years ago
- Owner: Queensland Investment Corporation
- Num. of stores: 322 (as of January 2019)
- Num. of anchor tenants: 7
- Floor area: 115,000 square metres (1,240,000 sq ft) as of July 2016
- Floors: 2 Retail; 3 Car Park
- Parking: 4600
- Website: pacificwerribee.com.au

Pacific Werribee (formerly known as Werribee Plaza) is a major regional shopping centre located in the suburb of Hoppers Crossing, approximately 29 kilometres (18 mi) south-west of the Melbourne Central Business District (CBD) in Victoria, Australia.

On 3 February 2014, it was announced that Werribee Plaza would be rebranded as Pacific Werribee as part of a A$370 million redevelopment. The revamped shopping centre includes a two-level Myer Department Store, Gold Class Cinemas, a new Target store, a new Fresh Food Precinct and a relocated Library and Bingo centre. The redevelopment of the shopping centre was completed in June 2017.

According to the Melbourne 2030 Metropolitan Strategy, Pacific Werribee is located in one of twenty-six recognised Principal Activity Centres.

== History ==
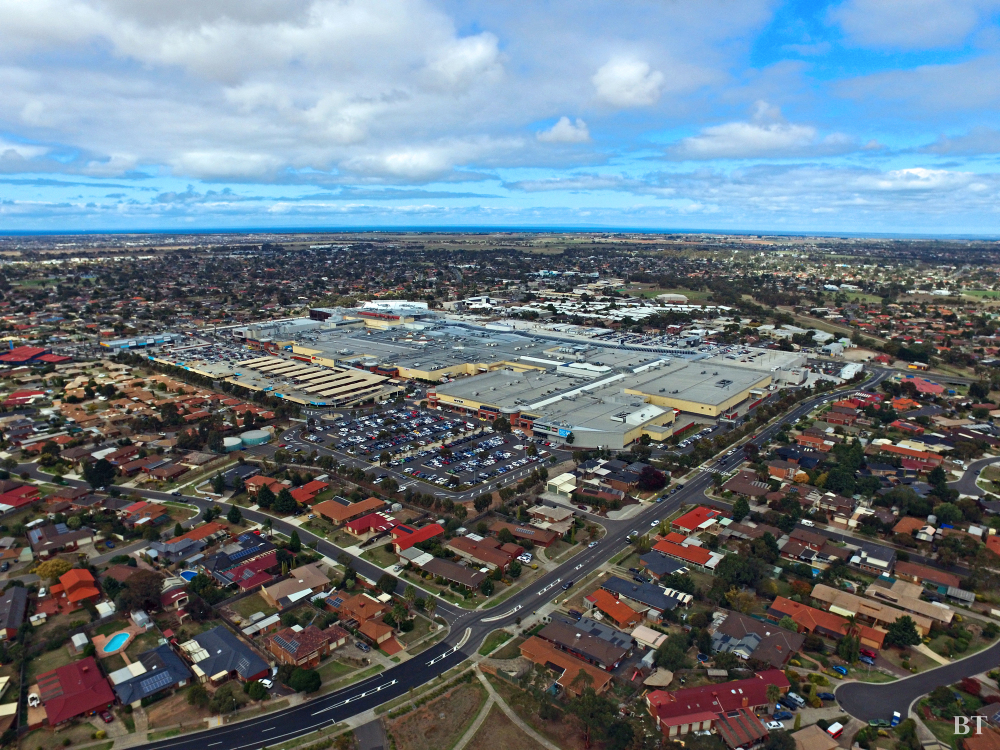
Aerial view of Pacific Werribee Shopping Centre in April 2017

Werribee Plaza first opened in 1985. The centre has had a total of 7 stages of construction over time, with the 7th stage commencing in late 2013. The complex was originally in two separate buildings up until the second stage. The largest building included fresh food supermarkets and minor stores, while the other was covered by a single floored Myer Store.

Originally the centre included a 3 levelled entertainment district including La Porchetta located on the Heaths Road Carpark, an Arcade and a Village Cinemas. In late 2014, the district was demolished to create the 2 levelled Plaza Tavern, Myer Department Store, Urban Diner, a new Village Cinemas, an Underground Car Parking System for the new Village Cinemas, a Bingo Centre, Library and other huge additions.

Through the centre's redevelopment, Werribee Plaza/Pacific Werribee has been recategorised twice. Before redevelopment Pacific Werribee was originally a regional centre. From mid 2015, it was later announced that through construction the centre had been recategorised 'major regional' due to the centre's area growth. On 28 August, it was announced Pacific Werribee's redevelopment was complete. Due to an addition of area growth and anchor tenants it was officially marked Pacific Werribee a super regional retail complex, but still according to the website, it claims the categorisation did not change.

== Redevelopment ==
Pacific Werribee has now undergone several stages of renovations and redevelopments since its opening.

=== Stage 2 ===
Stage 2 consisted mainly of the construction of a totally separate building on the west side of the site that would later be connected to the existing centre. With this, Pacific Werribee saw the addition of a Woolworths supermarket, Big W, Best & Less and Harris Scarfe, and the installation of glass panelling to create an open space feel. This stage costed roughly A$40.8 million.

=== Stage 4 ===
Stage four saw the creation of the relocated Kmart store, construction of the food court in the existing building located east end of the centre and the installation of glass panelling above, the re-creation of 4 entrances to suit new centre facade and re-tiling of entire existing building. Stage 4's developments were worth about A$25 million.

=== Stages 5 and 6 ===
Stages 5 and 6 were an important part of the expansion and included the creation of a new area to link the existing and new buildings together to create a unified centre. These 2 stages combined cost about A$13 million.

=== Stage 7 ===
On 3 February 2014, Pacific Shopping Centres announced that the Werribee Plaza will be rebranded to Pacific Werribee as a part of a A$370 million redevelopment. The shopping centre was projected to grow by 35,000 m^{2}, making it the 20th largest in Australia and the 9th largest shopping centre in Victoria.

At the beginning of the redevelopment, the Plaza Corner Library and Bingo Centre was demolished, along with the Plaza Tavern and BWS drive through. MyCar would relocate to make way for the multi-level car park on the Heaths Road side of the shopping centre. The Reject Shop would relocate nearby Coles and Kmart, where Kmart would permanently close their outside gardening centre. The bus interchange relocated and opened in mid 2014 with increased capacity, and stores such as Supercheap Auto and Midas would undergo renovations to make way for updated intersections on Derrimut Road.

In June 2015, the Urban Diner precinct was completed. The revamped food court included new and improved seating, and included a range of restaurants such as The Sporting Globe, Schnitz, Grill'd, Guzman y Gomez and San Churro. The Village Cinemas opened with the inclusion of Gold Class and along with the new two-level Plaza Tavern next door. Woolworths renovated soon after to include an expansion of their freezer aisle and a relocated BWS store. The Pancake Parlour, and the new Library and Bingo Centre would open in August and new parking was made available underground, and around renovated Hungry Jack's and KFC restaurants.

In August 2015, the Target mall was opened to the public. The new look Target was the successor of the store at the Hoppers Crossing Shopping Centre. Along with Target, stores such as Chemist Warehouse, Adairs, Bonds, Sportsco, Famous Footwear, Pumpkin Patch, Ollie's Place, Cotton On Body and Cotton On Kids were re-located to or included in the new mall. The Coffee Club also opened, making it the second store in Wyndham, the other being in Stockland. Point Cook. Approximately 500 new parking spaces were open in the multi-level car park on Heaths Road.

In July 2016, the Myer mall was completed. It included a two-level Myer store, H&M, Uniqlo, Sportsgirl, Seed, a renovated JB Hi-Fi and a Samsung kiosk. Also, some clothing stores from the Fashion Walk precinct moved to the Myer mall such as, Factorie, Cotton On, Just Jeans and Jayjays. Stores such as Autograph, Victoria Station, Suzannegrae and Shoex would replace the relocated stores in the Fashion Walk. Timezone opened on the second floor outside Myer and over 1000 new parking spaces were open upon the completion of the new shopping precinct. Kmart would also undergo renovations the following month, it included a new layout where cash registers moved to the centre of the store, expanded range of goods and increased capacity for fitting rooms. Their status of trading 24 hours a day was retained.

In June 2017, the Fresh Food precinct was completed. Unlike the previous openings in Pacific Werribee, stores opened on various days, rather than all stores opening at once. This included a new Aldi with a new look layout in comparison to other stores nearby, Market Place, Fish Pier, Pacific Asian, Pretty's Prime Cuts and Direct Organics. Some new restaurants such as Dumpling Chef, Sushi Sushi and Billy's Place also opened to the public, and stores such as Toys R Us and Daiso opened in the new area. EB Games Australia and Rebel Sport would undergo renovations to expand their range of products and services, marking the completion of Pacific Werribee's redevelopment.

In October 2019, Pacific Shopping Centres notified Probuild Constructions, who executed the centre's redevelopment, of significant structural defects. They later attempted to sue Probuild for damages, which were estimated to cost upwards of $350 million. However, due to them entering voluntary administration in February 2022, Pacific were forced to undertake works to remedy the defects themselves. This officially began in February 2023, with Target and a number of other retailers temporarily closing until November of that year. In February 2024 the final stage of these works began, with Myer, Village Cinemas, Timezone, JB Hi-Fi, La Porchetta and The Sporting Globe among the retailers temporarily closing to enable the works to be completed. This was completed in December 2024.

== Transport ==
Pacific Werribee has a major bus interchange located on the east side of the centre. This bus interchange has 5 Public Transport Victoria (PTV) routes (161, 166, 167, 170 and 181). These routes are all operated by CDC Melbourne. Prior to the redevelopment the centre had 7 routes running from it, however that was changed due to both the redevelopment itself and the 2015 restructure of the Wyndham Bus Network.

== See also ==
- Hoppers Crossing, Victoria
- Werribee, Victoria
- List of shopping centres in Australia
