= Waverley Gardens Shopping Centre =

Coordinates: 37°56′13″S 145°11′24″E

- Location: Mulgrave, Victoria, Australia
- Opened: 15 March 1977
- Renovated: 1980–81; 2004–06
- Developer: Hanover Holdings (1977); Hersfield Developments (1981)
- Manager: JLL
- Num. of stores: ~110
- Num. of anchor tenants: 6
- Floor area: ~40,000 m^{2} (430,000 sq ft)
- Floors: 1
- Parking: ~2200
- Public transit: Ventura
- Website: www.waverleygardens.com.au

Waverley Gardens is a shopping centre with approximately 110 shops, located 25 km south-east of Melbourne, Australia, in the suburb of Mulgrave. The shopping centre has the Monash Freeway on its north-east border, Police Road on its southern border and Hansworth Street on the western side.

== History ==
In the early 1970s, developer George Herscu purchased 18 hectares of abandoned farm land at the corner of Police and Jacksons Roads in Mulgrave, intending to establish a modern indoor shopping centre alongside a housing estate. The project was formally announced in 1976, with construction of the centre commencing under the banner of Hanover Holdings. About 60 residential lots were developed concurrently, creating Hansworth Street and several courts.

The centre officially opened on 15 March 1977 with about 60 specialty stores, a Safeway "hypermarket" and a Venture department store. Construction of the Stage 2 extension began in 1980 under Hersfield Developments, adding a further 56 shops, 5 kiosks, a fitness centre, a twin-screen Hoyts cinema, professional offices, and Victoria's largest Target store – opening for trading in mid–1981.

In 1989, the receivers of Hersfield Developments sold Waverley Gardens to Growth Equities Mutual. In 2004, a 3-stage redevelopment process began. Refurbishments include the construction of two multi-storey car parks and restoration of a third, the relocation of the bus terminal, the extension of the Shopping Centre on the north-east side, and general improvements to the inside appearance of the shopping locations.

In May 2005, the first major stage of development was completed, with the opening of Coles, as well as many other smaller shops in a corridor towards Target. This included the refurbishment of the entrances, and general appearance of the walkways. Part of this development included the opening of two multi-storey car-parks on the south-western side.

In December 2006, a new-look food court was opened.The second stage of development was officially completed on 8 March 2007, with the opening of Big W. This included a number of smaller shops, and a restored car-park on the north-eastern side. By 2013 the owner Mirvac sold the shopping centre to, apparently, Blackstone who sold it to Elanor in 2018 as part of their passive exit from the retail industry.
