= Moonee Valley Coaches =

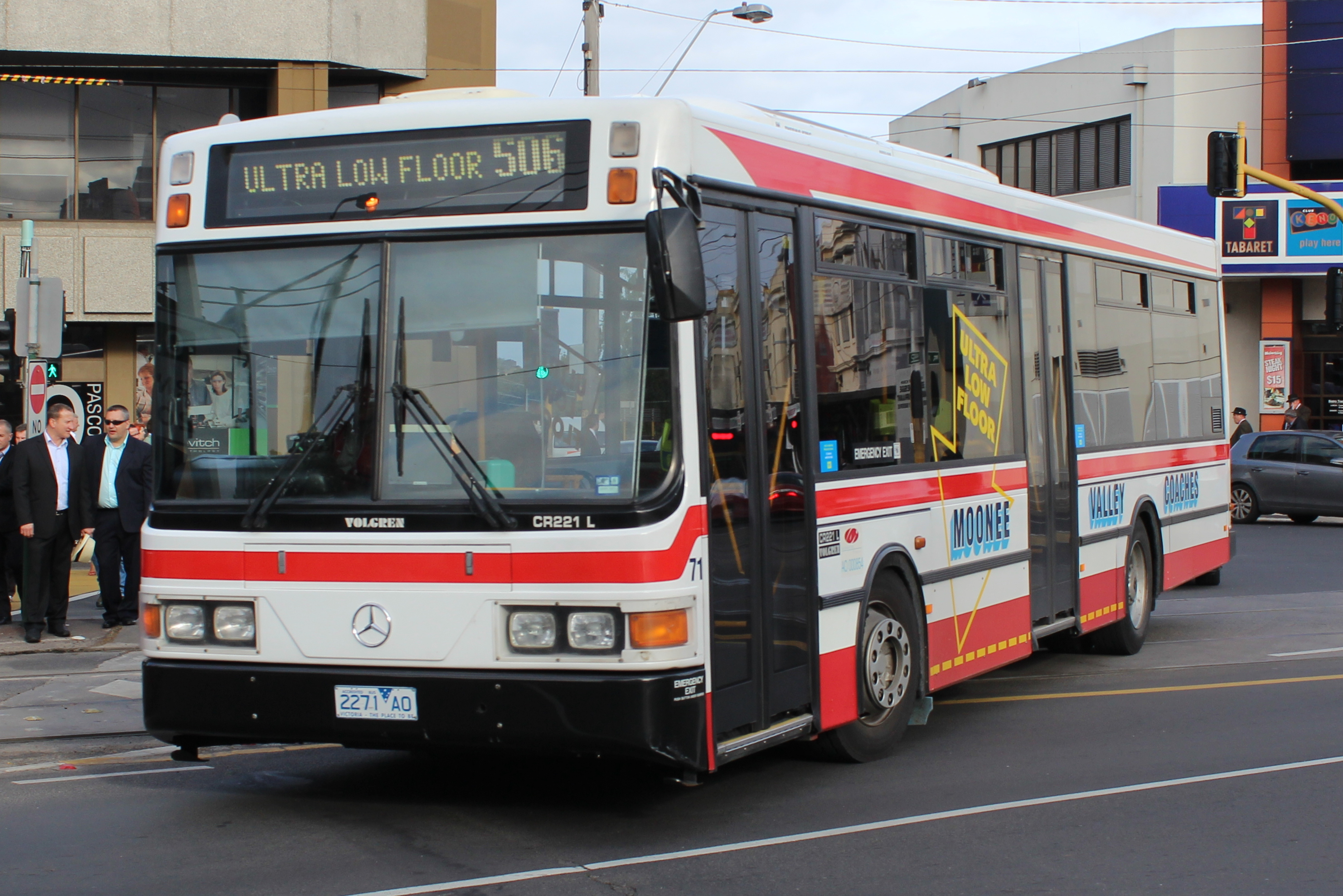
- Volgren bodied Mercedes-Benz O405NH at Moonee Ponds Junction in October 2012
- Parent: Higginson family
- Commenced operation: 1964
- Headquarters: Tullamarine
- Service area: North Melbourne
- Service type: Bus & coach operator
- Fleet: 37 (February 2024)
- Website: www.mooneevalleybus.com.au

Moonee Valley Coaches is a school and charter bus and coach charter operator in Melbourne, Australia. The company was also a route service operator up until March 2024 it operated two route services under contract to Public Transport Victoria which were transferred to Dysons and then to Kinetic Melbourne on the 1st of July 2025.

== History ==
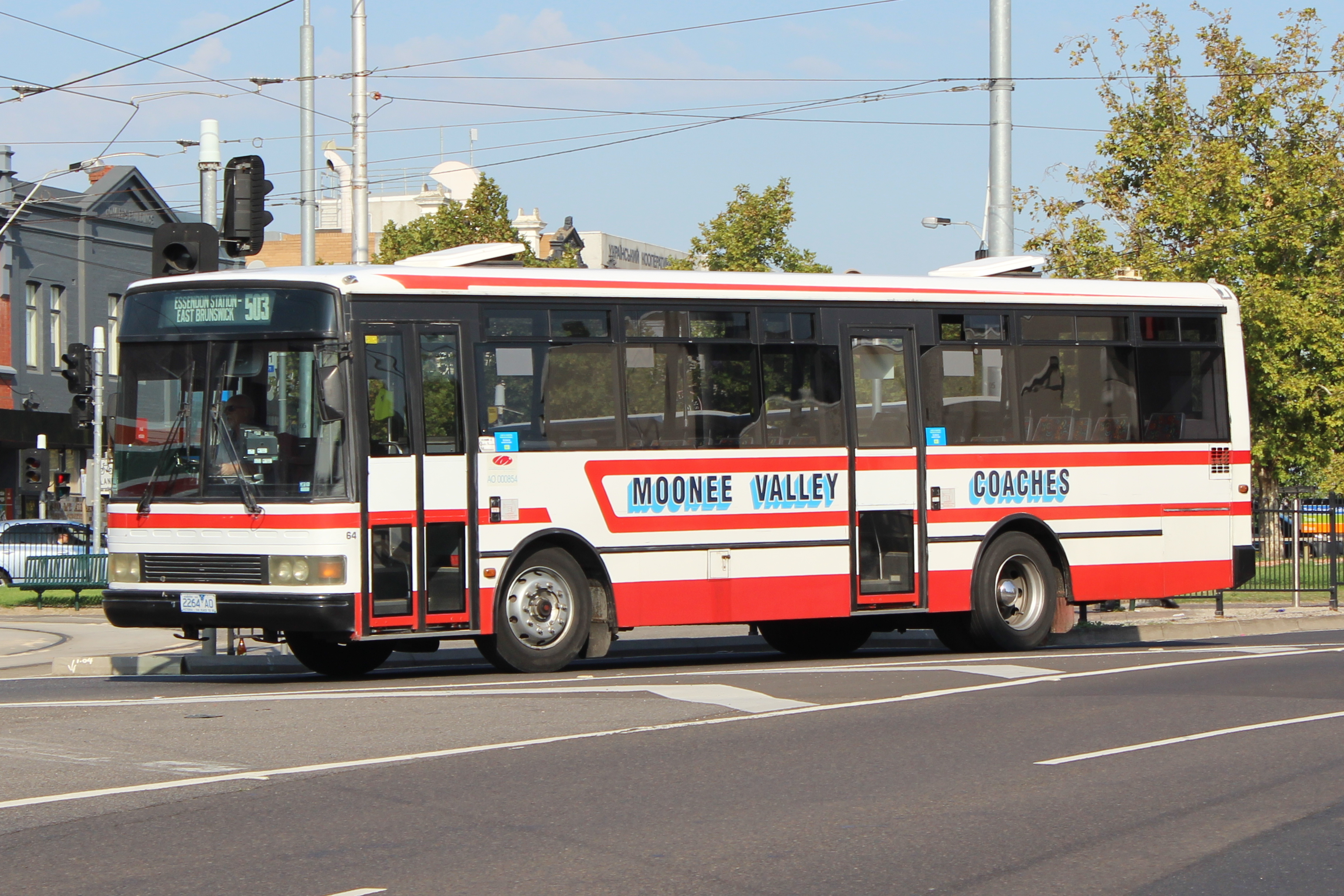
Pressed Metal Corporation Australia bodied Metrotec Delta 16.210 in Essendon in April 2013

In 1964 Ray Higginson bought a bus serving Dawson Street, Brunswick. By 1966, the business was named Moonee Valley Bus Lines, and in 1969, a partnership with Joe Bellafiori was formed.

Charter services commenced in 1968, expanding to Australia wide touring and camping tours in 1970 when the first new dedicated charter coach was bought. The early 1970s saw more expansion with the purchase of Nuline Bus Service, Caulfield. In 1985, the partnership was dissolved with Bellafiori taking Nuline Bus Service and Higginson Moonee Valley. In 1987, Cunningham Bus Lines was purchased with route 503 Essendon station to Brunswick East.

In November 2014, a heritage museum was established within the company's Tullamarine depot.

Two route services, 503 Essendon station to Brunswick East and 506 Moonee Ponds Junction to Westgarth. were operated under contract to Public Transport Victoria until sold to Dysons with 11 vehicles on 1 March 2024.

== Fleet ==
As at February 2024, the fleet consisted of 37 buses and coaches. Fleet livery is white with red stripes and blue signwriting while some new route buses carry the Public Transport Victoria orange and white livery.
