= Westfield Doncaster =

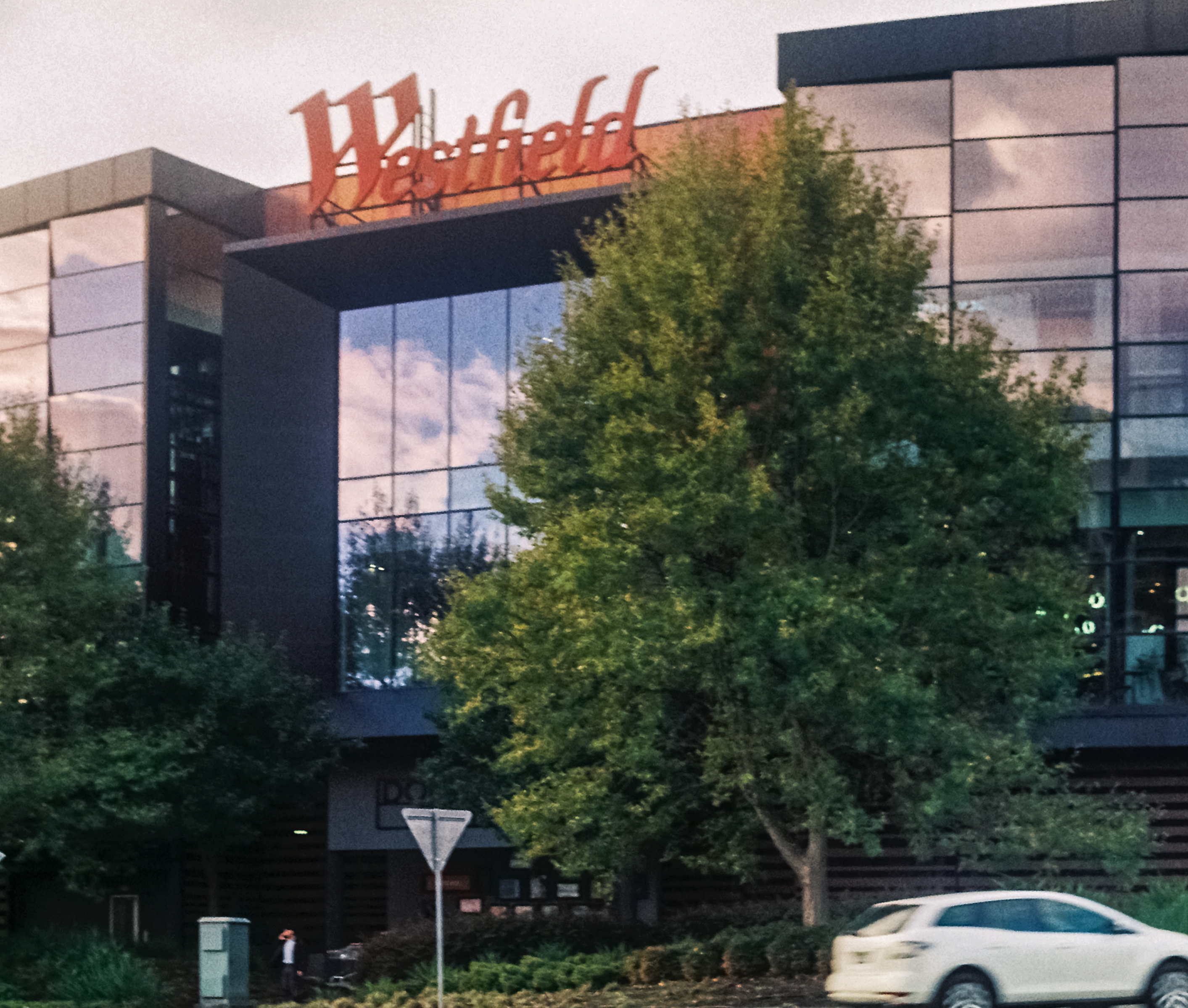
- Westfield Doncaster as seen from the Doncaster Road and Williamsons Road intersection.
- Location: Doncaster, Victoria, Australia
- Coordinates: 37°47′00″S 145°07′30″E
- Opened: 30 September 1969; 57 years ago
- Developer: Westfield Group
- Manager: Scentre Group
- Owner: Scentre Group (50%); IFM Investors (25%); Asia Property Fund (25%)
- Num. of stores: 413
- Num. of anchor tenants: 6 (Myer, David Jones, Woolworths, Coles, Kmart, Big W)
- Floor area: 123,126 square metres (1,325,320 sq ft)
- Floors: 4
- Parking: 5,397
- Public transit: Buses
- Website: westfield.com.au/doncaster

Westfield Doncaster (formerly Doncaster Shoppingtown and colloquially known as “Shoppo”) is a large shopping centre and public transport interchange in the eastern suburb of Doncaster in Melbourne, Victoria, Australia. It was the first shopping centre built by the Westfield Group in Victoria.

Located on the corner of Williamsons Road and Doncaster Road in Doncaster Hill, it forms a central component of strategic planning to develop housing and employment centres in the area by Manningham City Council. It is located 12 kilometres east of the CBD and is one of the biggest shopping centres in Victoria. Today it is one of the largest shopping centres in Australia with a gross leasable floor area of 123,126 square metres. It is 50% owned by Scentre Group, 25% by IFM Investors, and 25% by Asia Property Fund.

== History ==
The site of the present-day buildings was formerly occupied by orchards and a small shop owned by the Serpell family, well-known early European settlers in the area. In the 1930s it became known as 'White's Corner Store' after its operator changed hands. In the late 1960s, they sold the site to the Westfield Corporation who began construction of the new shopping centre.

When Westfield Doncaster officially opened on 30 September 1969, it was Westfield's first venture in Victoria. The original $12-million complex consisted of the four-storey Myer department store at the north end, two levels of shops running along the west side to the, then white, eight-storey office tower. On the east side the two layers of shops merged into one layer, then finished at a Coles New World supermarket.

=== First redevelopment ===
In 1979, the centre was extended south with two single-storey rows of shops; Kmart, Coles and Village Twin Cinemas.

=== Second redevelopment ===
A major redevelopment completed in 1992 saw the centre expand further. A second level of shops was added to the south end including Franklins and a fresh food court above Coles and Kmart.

=== Third redevelopment ===
The centre was further redeveloped in 1995.

=== Fourth redevelopment ===
Construction of Westfield Doncaster in its early stages in 2007

The fourth group of changes began in 2007 and involved significant changes to the complex. The process commenced with planning approval in May 2004, preliminary works taking place at the centre from September to December 2006, which provided a platform for the main construction works that commenced on 15 January 2007. Doncaster Hill developers met several times with City Council over the next twelve months to discuss creating more sustainable buildings for the community but these plans did not progress.

The refurbishment included renovations to anchor tenants Coles and Woolworths supermarkets, and the addition of a greengrocer. Other changes included renovations to the existing Myer department store and additions of new anchor tenants Big W, Target new David Jones and a Borders(now closed). New shops were added into the greatly expanded retail space such as JB Hi-Fi, Dick Smith (now closed), a larger 9 screen Village Cinemas, a gym which replaced the Doncaster Library, a new food court known as the Drum located on the corner of Williamsons and Doncaster Roads and new restaurants on the rooftop level. A new bus interchange and over 1500 extra parking spaces were added in a new 6 level parking lot with an LED system indicating free spaces. A new red "wave wall" piece of public art was constructed on the corner of Williamsons Road and Doncaster Road and the Myer Building and the Office Tower were repainted. A number of new and upgraded building and carpark entrances were also included as part of the works. The number of retail shops doubled to 400, which made it one of the largest shopping centres in Australia. It was finished on 16 October 2008.

Kmart shut down on January 7, 2007 and was replaced by two new discount department stores – Big W and Target during construction. Coles and Woolworths both closed in January 2007 and both supermarkets re-opened on Thursday 10 April 2008. The Village Twin Cinemas on Williamsons Road were demolished in September 2006 to make way for a multi-level car park with new cinemas to open above. The Westfield Shoppingtown Library was also demolished and moved temporarily to the Municipal Offices which has since become its permanent location.

Westfield Doncaster also introduced a new service called Westfield Butler to assist those unable to physically shop at the centre and perform other tasks for customers, including planning events and functions. Another new service was 'Westfield Gizmo' that offered customers a technology installation, upgrade or maintenance service. Staff are titled "gizmotechs", and can arrange both home visits or to assist shoppers choosing technology in the centre at a fixed price. Both of these services no longer exist.

In February 2008, a temporary bus interchange opened closer to Willamsons Road. This was to make way for changes to the centre entrance and an upgraded bus interchange which opened with upgraded shelters and other facilities.

Comparison table
	Before	After
Number of shops	202	400
Major stores	Myer; Coles; Kmart; Woolworths; Village 2 Cinemas	Myer; David Jones; Woolworths; Coles; Kmart; Big W Village 9 Cinemas; Rebel Sport; JB Hi-Fi; TK Maxx; Baby Bunting
Car park spaces	3,480	5,000
Retail space (gross lettable area)	51,000 m^{2}	120,000 m^{2}

=== Fifth redevelopment ===
In July 2016, Westfield submitted a $500 million expansion masterplan, aimed at competing against other shopping centres such as Eastland Shopping Centre to the City of Manningham and to the Minister for Planning (see First Andrews Ministry) for approval to expand by nearly a third with substantial car parking, and build a 14-story tower taller than the existing office tower that may stand out over the skyline. The plan would add 43,000 sqm of retail floor space and 18,000 sqm of office floor space (north of the existing building), add 2,793 more car parking spaces (to make a total of 7,575 spaces), building a 14-storey "gateway tower" on a 2-storey podium, reconfigure the bus interchange and move the main vehicle entrance on Williamsons Road further north. This was approved on 20 May 2019 by the state government, with the Minister for Planning (see Second Andrews Ministry) Richard Wynne claiming 2,000 jobs will be created during construction, and 2,900 full and part time positions will be created upon completion.

Kmart returned to the centre in mid 2021, replacing Target which closed permanently on 20 March 2021.

== Complex ==
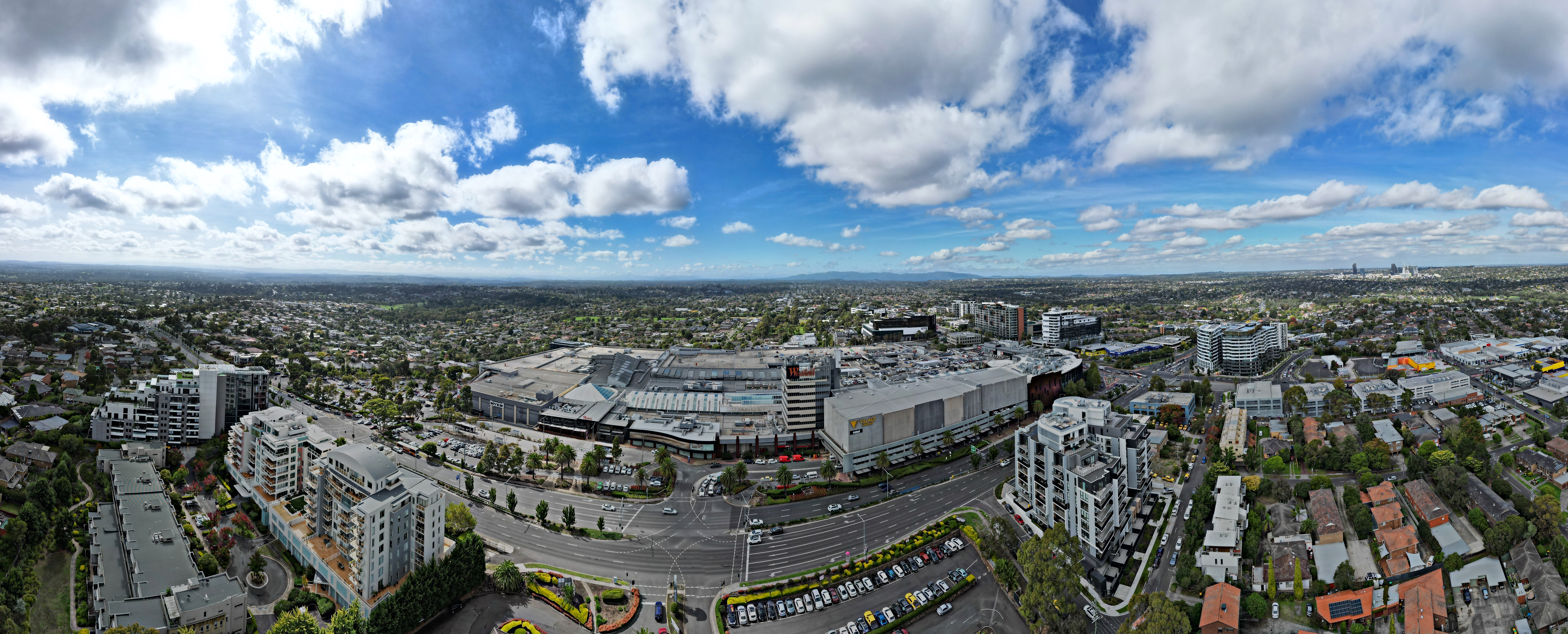
Aerial panorama of Westfield Doncaster and its surrounds on Doncaster Hill. April 2023. Mount Dandenong sits on the horizon.

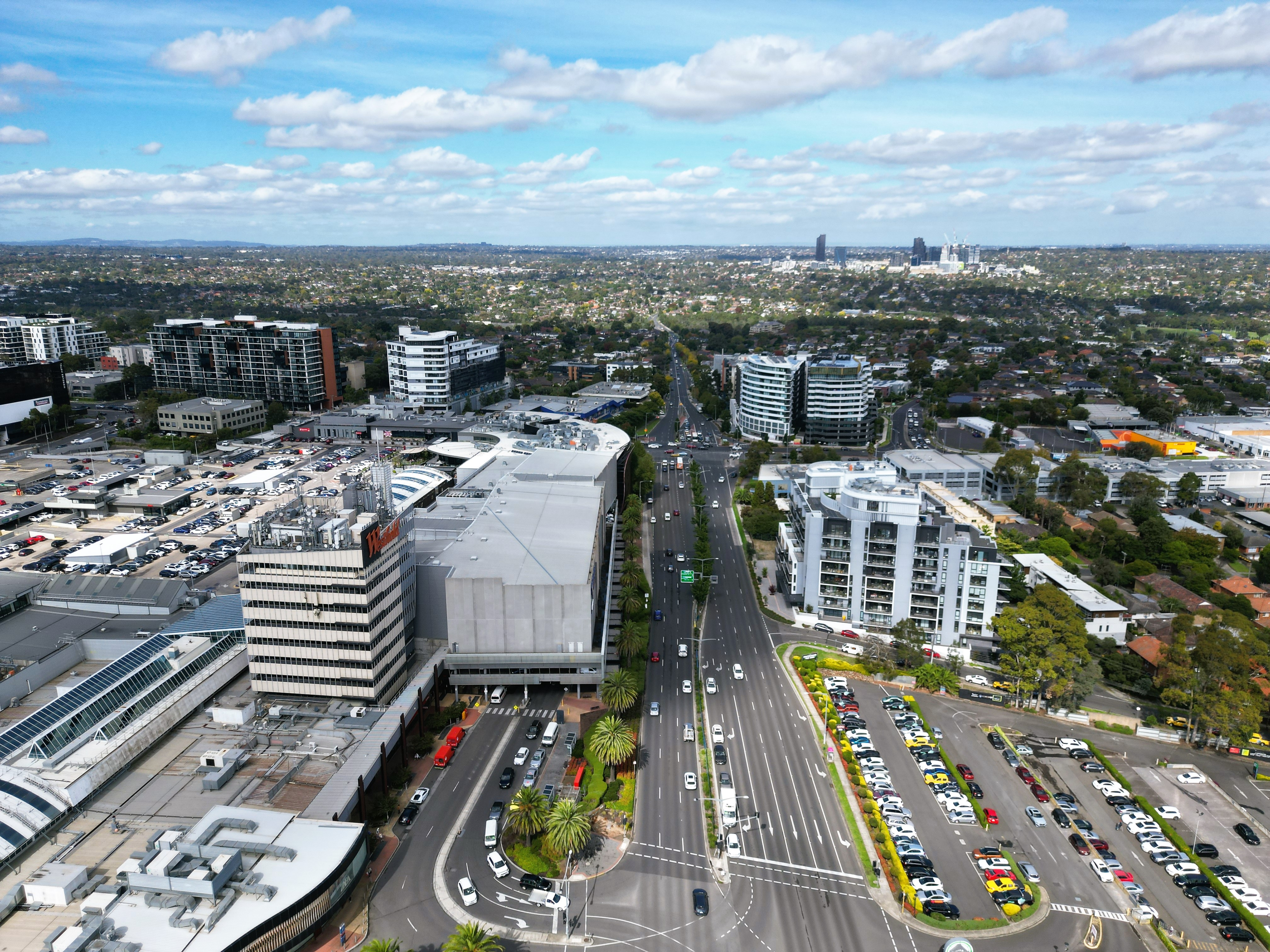
Aerial perspective of Westfield Doncaster from Williamsons Road looking south towards Box Hill. April 2023.

The new Westfield Doncaster now features more than 200 new retailers for a total around 400, a Village Cinemas complex and dining areas that take advantage of the site's elevated views towards the city skyline. The works required the closure of around 100 stores during 2007 and early 2008, with Myer the only major store remaining open throughout the project, except for a short period when the store itself was refurbished.

=== Doncaster Dining ===
In November 2020, a new rooftop dining precinct, Doncaster Dining, was opened during Victoria's second COVID-19 lockdown. At a cost of $30 million, the existing second floor (in the southern section of the shopping centre, near Doncaster Road) and a section of the car park near Village Cinemas was renovated to include 12 new shops and remake 2 existing shops. The stores include TGI Fridays, an American grill; Dohtonbori, named in reference to Dōtonbori with its second Australian restaurant; Lanzhou Noodle House; and Little Bangkok Thai amongst others.

== Public transport ==
The shopping centre is serviced by a number of bus routes. These routes utilise the major bus interchange on the Williamsons Road side of the shopping centre, serving as a major hub for transport activity in the Doncaster region. The SmartBus route 907, which provides a frequent, direct route to the city, doesn't enter the interchange, using stops next to the centre on Doncaster Road instead.

Throughout the 1970s the Doncaster line was mooted to run down the middle of the Eastern Freeway, with a station at Westfield Doncaster. By 1984 land for the line once it left the freeway had been sold, and by 1991 an independent report investigating construction of the line recommended against it due to the high cost of underground construction. Various plans have also been made for extension of tram route 48 north from Balwyn North to Doncaster. A 2008 report released by pt4me2 (a local group pushing for rail transit in Manningham) suggests a $5 billion budget for the public transport to make all train services run every 10 minutes and introduce a Doncaster rail line, branching off from Clifton Hill.

== See also ==
- List of shopping centres in Australia
- Proposed Melbourne rail extensions
