= McKenzie's Tourist Services =

Bus operator in Melbourne, Australia

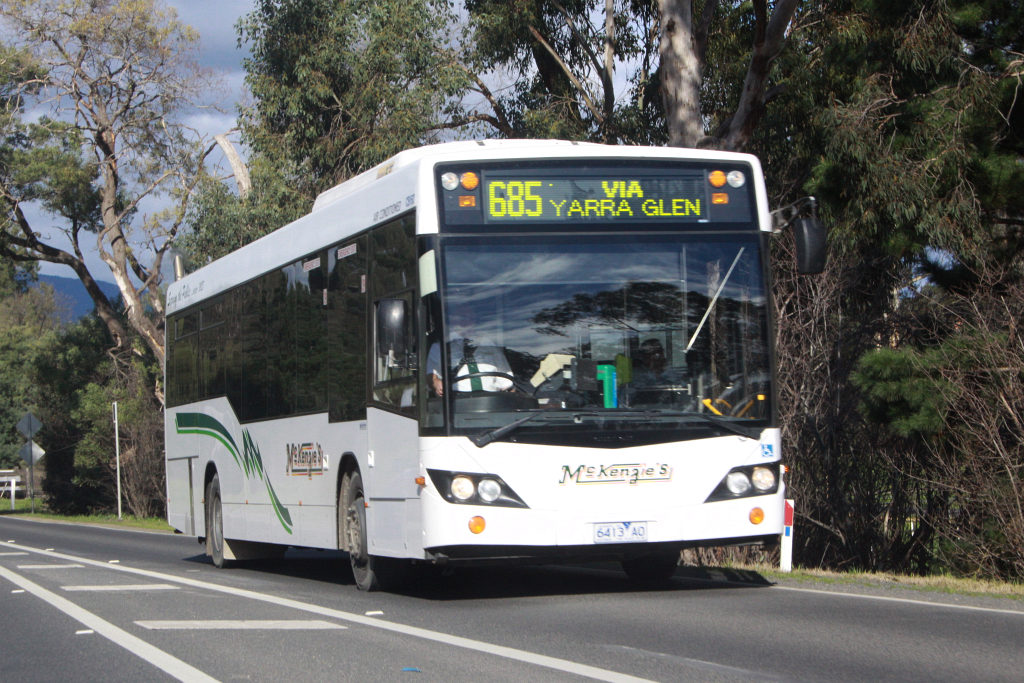
- Custom Coaches bodied MAN 18.280 in Healesville in July 2010
- Parent: Dineen Group
- Commenced operation: 1927
- Headquarters: Healesville
- Service area: Eastern Melbourne
- Service type: Bus & coach operator
- Routes: 5
- Fleet: 57 (November 2022)
- Chief executive: Bill Dineen
- Website: www.mckenzies.com.au

McKenzie's Tourist Services is a bus operator in Melbourne, Australia. It operates Two routes under contract to Public Transport Victoria. It is a subsidiary of the Dineen Group.

== History ==
In 1927, Lorry McKenzie commenced operating a service in Healesville after purchasing a Packard car when on a trip to Sydney. McKenzie had this car elongated and began transporting people. He then purchased some smaller buses and continued to operate his service. In September 2006, McKenzie's Tourist Services was sold to the Dineen Group.

== Fleet ==
As at October 2026, the fleet consisted of 61 buses and coaches.
