= The Pines Shopping Centre =

Coordinates: 37°45′43″S 145°10′7″E

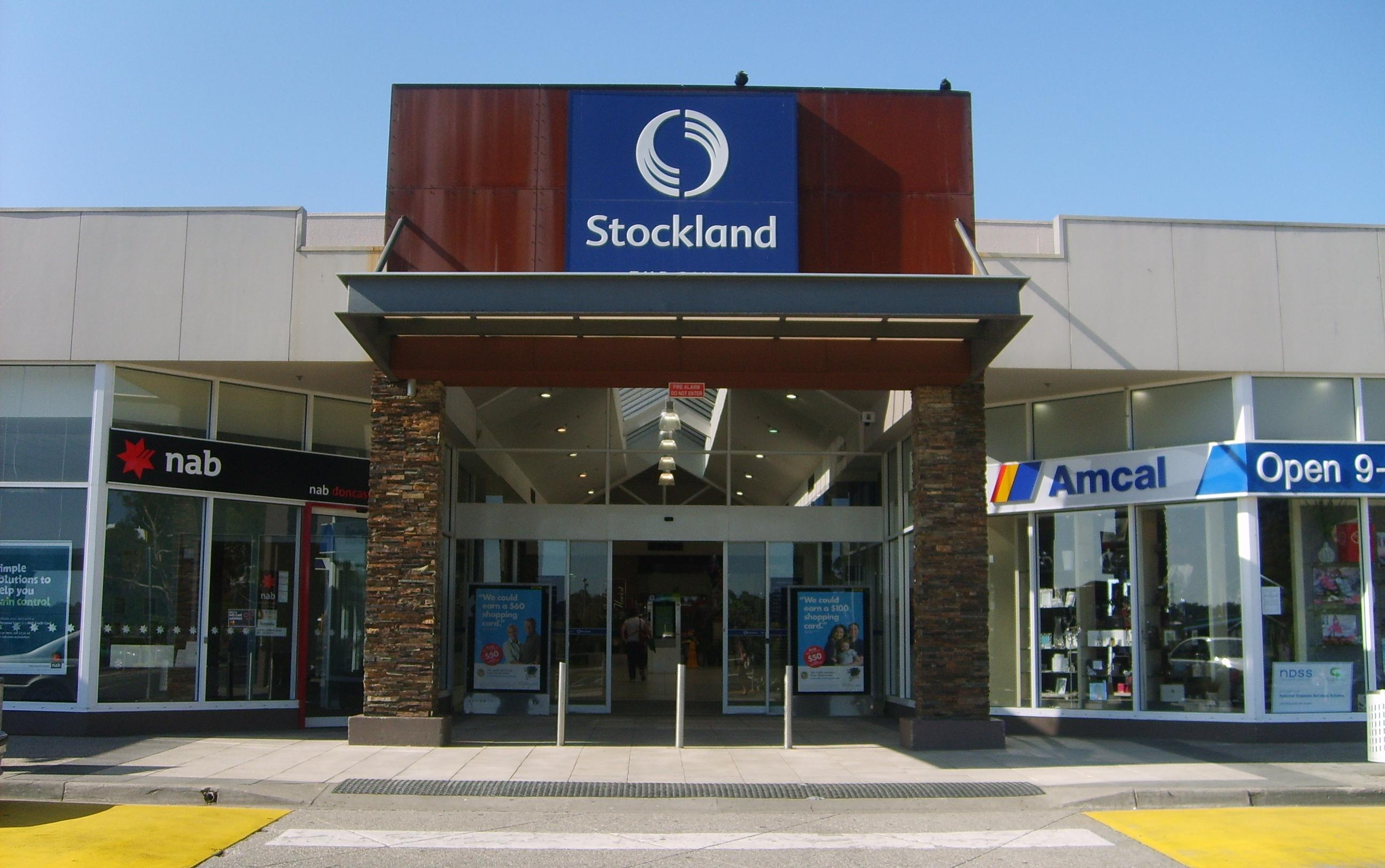
- Main Entrance
- Location: Doncaster East, Victoria, Australia
- Opened: 27 October 1986; 40 years ago
- Previous names: Stockland The Pines
- Developer: Lustig & Moar
- Manager: Haben Property Fund
- Owner: 54% JY Group, 46% Haben Property Fund
- Num. of stores: 101
- Num. of anchor tenants: 4
- Floor area: 25,260 m^{2} (271,900 sq ft)
- Floors: 1
- Parking: 1,400 (170 undercover)
- Website: www.thepinescentre.com.au

The Pines Shopping Centre, formerly Stockland The Pines, is a sub regional shopping centre located in the north-eastern suburb of Doncaster East in Melbourne, Australia. The centre is approximately 19 km east of the Melbourne CBD and is situated on the corner of Blackburn and Reynolds Roads. It was opened on 27 October 1986 by state opposition leader Jeff Kennett. Amenities at The Pines Shopping Centre include a library, community centre, medical centre, several banks, over 100 speciality stores and undercover parking.

== History ==
The Pines Shopping Centre was developed by Lustig & Moar. It was opened by leader of the opposition Jeff Kennett on 27 October 1986.

In 2000 the shopping centre which consisted of a Target, Woolworths and 45 speciality stores with a GLA of 15,000 sqm underwent a minor cosmetic refurbishment. In 2004 the Westfield Group commenced a multi-million dollar expansion of the centre to include Coles, Aldi, 55 new speciality stores and additional car parking at the northern end of the property. In October 2004 the centre was sold to Stockland and rebranded Stockland The Pines. In 2007 a multi-purpose community facility known as The Pines Learning and Activity Centre was opened at the back of the centre.

In late 2016, the shopping centre underwent a new refurbishment with Aldi expanding its floor space and a refresh of the speciality stores on offer. Kmart opened a new store in November 2016, replacing the existing Target store as part of Wesfarmers' strategy to consolidate the underperforming brand nationwide.

In January 2021, the centre was sold by Stockland to JY Group (54%) & Haben Property Fund (46%) and renamed back to The Pines Shopping Centre.
