= SmartBus =

Network of bus services in Melbourne, Australia

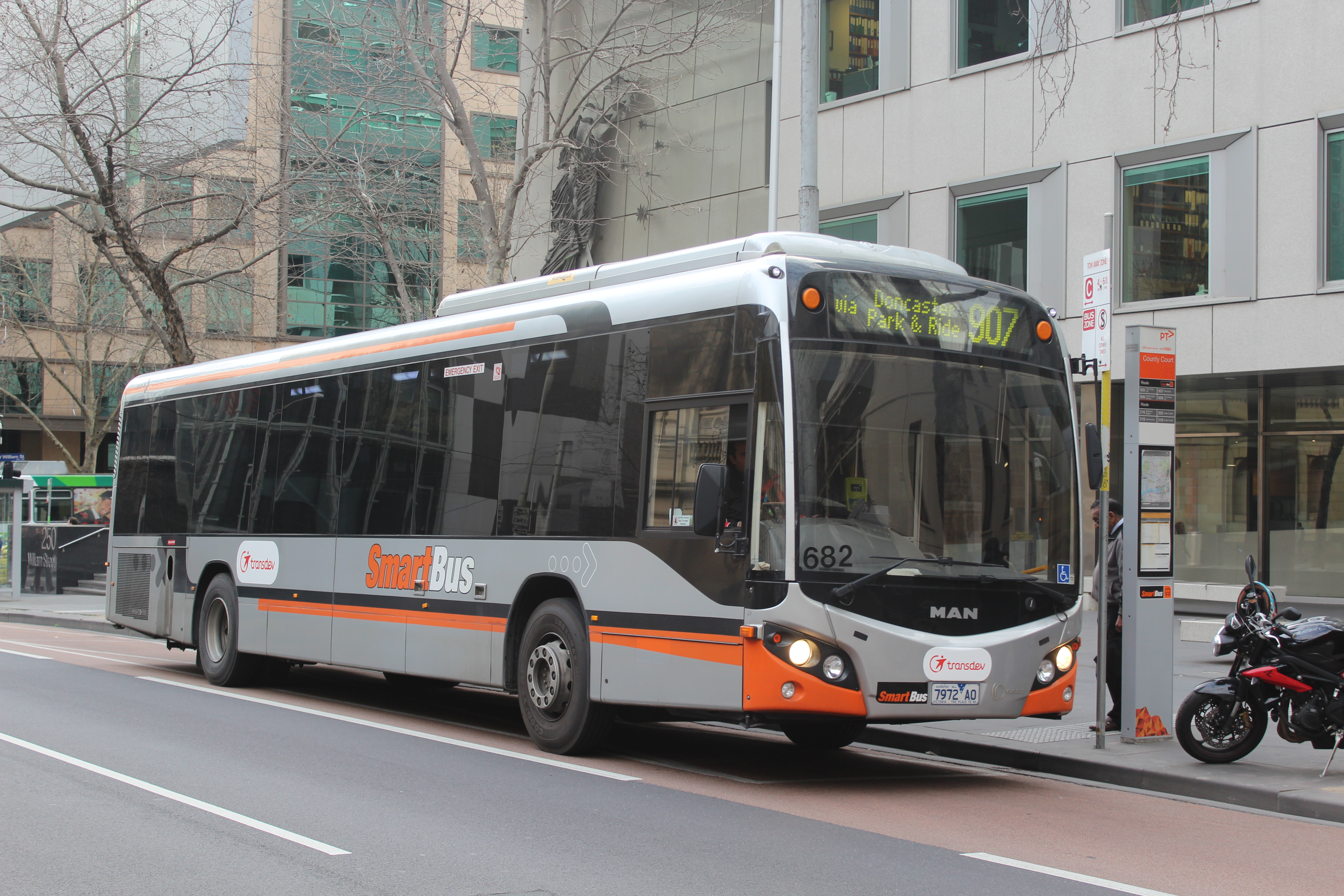
- Transdev Melbourne Custom Coaches bodied MAN 18.310 on Lonsdale Street in August 2013

Overview
- Locale: Melbourne
- Transit type: Bus
- Number of lines: 9 (including 3 Orbital and 4 DART)
- Website: SmartBus at PTV

Operation
- Operators: CDC Melbourne; Kinetic Melbourne; Ventura Bus Lines

SmartBus is a network of bus services in the city of Melbourne, Australia. Overseen by Transport Victoria, the network comprises nine key cross-town and orbital bus routes around Melbourne. Key aspects of the service include more frequent services, extended hours of operation to include late evening and Sunday services, improved timetable information at bus stops, roadspace priority along certain routes and priority at particular traffic lights. Buses on SmartBus routes are shared among three operators, with route 900 being operated by both Ventura Bus Lines and CDC Melbourne.

Originally proposed in the late 1990s, SmartBus services were introduced predominantly in the 2000s. It reached its current extent of nine routes in 2010.

== History ==
=== Context ===
Unlike trains and trams, which were historically government-operated – via the Victorian Railways and Melbourne & Metropolitan Tramways Board (MMTB) respectively – buses in Melbourne were mostly operated by smaller, private companies. Private operators generally competed with each other rather than car travel, with little co-ordination or network planning.

By the 1960s, new suburbs were also far from established railway and tramway lines. Train and tram routes generally ran frequently, until midnight, seven days per week; comparatively, bus services ran short hours, infrequently, and indirectly. Not even government-run routes were always as frequent as trams or trains.

The Victorian Government began more heavily co-ordinating bus services from 1971, when all routes were given 3-digit numbers for the first time. This was followed by new powers under the Transport Act 1983: the newly established Metropolitan Transit Authority (also known as 'The Met') was legislated to manage bus services and better integrate them with train and tram routes.

=== MetPlan 1988 ===
The first significant signs of what eventually became SmartBus are evident in The Met's first integrated transport plan: MetPlan 1988.

MetPlan saw bus services as "important" in "serving those journeys that cannot be made on fixed rail routes" and to "feed" heavy and light rail. To achieve this role, however, bus services would need some substantial upgrades. For example, instead of finishing early at 6-7pm, it suggested that all bus routes run until 8pm on weekdays, and at a minimum half-hourly frequency. It also suggested that bus service kilometres should increase at least 33% to provide "acceptable" service to new areas.

More critically, however, the MetPlan was the first to envisage what would eventually become SmartBus: it proposed a series of cross-suburban bus routes, linking major 'neighbourhood' centres with train stations, shopping centres and other activity centres. These would be called MetLink, not to be connected to the later Metlink Melbourne (2000s).

The Plan proposed MetLink bus services on the following routes:

MetLink proposed bus services (1988) and SmartBus (2006)
From	Via	To	SmartBus (2006)
Werribee	Laverton, Albion, St Albans and Airport West	Broadmeadows	902 (Green Orbital): Airport West to Broadmeadows; Green Orbital: Airport West to Werribee (not introduced)
Werribee	Laverton, Sunshine, and Highpoint Shopping Centre	Moonee Ponds	Blue Orbital: Highpoint to Moonee Ponds (not introduced)
St Albans		Preston	
Broadmeadows	via Camp Road, Campbellfield, Keon Park, and Bundoora	Greensborough future: Ringwood	902 (Green Orbital)
Pascoe Vale	via Bell Street, Coburg, Preston, and Heidelberg	Doncaster	903 (Red Orbital)
Doncaster	via Box Hill, Oakleigh, Chadstone Shopping Centre and Southland Shopping Centre	Sandringham	903 (Red Orbital): Doncaster to Oakleigh/Chadstone
Doncaster	via Nunawading, Tally Ho, Glen Waverley and Springvale	Edithvale	902 (Green Orbital)
Ringwood	via Knox City, Stud Road and Dandenong	Frankston	901 (Yellow Orbital)
Lilydale	via Dorset Road, Upper Ferntree Gully and Rowville	Dandenong	
Wantirna		Upper Ferntree Gully	
Frankston	via Cranbourne	Berwick	
Frankston	via Mornington, Baxter and Moorooduc Road	Portsea	
Frankston	via Baxter	Balnarring	

Services would operate from early morning until at least midnight (weekdays), unlike other buses ending at 8pm. Frequencies would be at least every 30 minutes or better. On weekends, services would operate from 7am-8pm, with buses every 30 minutes on Saturdays and hourly on Sundays; most other bus routes would have limited weekend service. Some services would operate all-night.

Vehicles would offer seating and air conditioning to provide a "standard of service and comfort [...] comparable to trains".. Some routes would have had limited stops or express services in peak hours or use bus lanes. There would have been a distinct MetLink livery.

MetLink bus services were planned to be introduced by 1992. The early 1990s recession effectively prevented the plan from being implemented. Even had it not been for the recession, the Plan already noted in 1988 that there was "no real increase" in resources available, limiting scope for upgrade.

Still, many of MetLink's basic ideas - routes, service standards and special features - are evident in the design and implementation of the later 2000s SmartBus network.

=== 1990s ===
SmartBus was originally a policy initiative of the Kennett government in the late 1990s, focused on infrastructure and technology upgrades to the existing bus network rather than service improvement. However, no lasting progress was made prior to the 1999 Victorian state election, at which the Kennett Government was removed from office.

== SmartBus Program (2000s) ==
=== 2000–2004: Trial ===
Having won the 1999 state election, new premier Steve Bracks committed to a transport upgrade program: Linking Victoria.

A SmartBus trial was included in the program by at least 2001. Services along Springvale (888/9) and Blackburn (703) Roads would be upgraded in a trial, including both infrastructure upgrades - basic forms of traffic priority signalling, 'queue jump' bus lanes, and real-time passenger information screens, for example - as well as service upgrades: more frequent services, and new or improved weekend and evening services. Other features included services timed to co-ordinate with trains; a "route management system" to minimise delays, combined with the traffic priority measures; significantly improved bus stops; and new low-floor buses.

The pilot program was implemented on 5 August 2002.

Route 703 - Middle Brighton to Blackburn (operated by Ventura Bus Lines) - saw an increase in service by over 20%, with services operating every 15 minutes for most of weekdays, and longer evening services. Routes 888/889 - Nunawading to Chelsea (operated by Grenda's Bus Services) - saw improvements in service by up to 50%, with Sunday services added for the first time.

The pilot sought to determine whether increased services and better reliability would increase patronage. By 2003, on the project's first anniversary, patronage on affected routes had increased by 25%.

=== 2004–2007: New Routes ===
In late 2004, the State Government unveiled its new Linking Melbourne strategic transport plan. Among other priorities, significant investment in SmartBus was foreshadowed. The Plan identified a 19.4% increase in patronage on route 703 and 30.4% on routes 888/9 since SmartBus upgrades occurred, citing this as a justification for further expansion.

As a result, the State Government officially committed itself to introducing two new SmartBus services: Warrigal Road and Wellington Road. The Plan also proposed the introduction of a Ringwood to Frankston SmartBus and an extension of Route 700 as the Red Orbital to Altona as priority projects, while ultimately foreseeing the completion of four orbital SmartBus routes around Melbourne and the upgrading of bus services in other 'Principal Public Transport Network (PPTN)' corridors to SmartBus standard.

Bus services were already provided on Warrigal Road in the form of route 700 - Mordialloc to Box Hill. The service, however, was constrained by an indirect routing around the former Mont Albert and Surrey Hills stations, and south around Riversdale Road. Services also only ran every 70 minutes on Sundays.

Under the Linking Melbourne plan, route 700 was re-launched as a SmartBus on 14 June 2005. The route was realigned via Riversdale Road and Station Street to Box Hill rather than the previous route, which was transferred to a new local route 766 (Box Hill–Burwood). Services were upgraded to operate every 15 minutes until 9pm on weekdays; and every 30 minutes from 9pm-12am (weekdays), 6am-12am (Saturdays), and 6am-9:30pm (Sundays). More frequent services operated during peak hours.

The State Government also committed to introducing a limited express SmartBus service on Wellington Road in October 2004, which would run between Caulfield station and Rowville via Chadstone Shopping Centre. This necessitated partial road widening on Wellington Road leading to delays in its introduction, and was introduced in conjunction with EastLink.

The new route was introduced on 16 October 2006, as Route 900 (Caulfield to Stud Park (Rowville)). The service had the typical 15-minute weekday daytime service and 30 minute service at other times. This route was the first SmartBus service to be operated by two operators - Grenda's Bus Service and Eastrans (now Ventura and CDC Melbourne).

=== 2007–2010: Going Orbital ===
The State Government released a further transport plan in late 2006: Meeting Our Transport Challenges. This identified expansion of the SmartBus network as a key priority.

Notably, the development of SmartBus would now be split into four stages:

1. Completion of initial phases:
  1. Introduction of the route 900 on Wellington Road (completed 16 October 2006);
  2. Introduction of Yellow Orbital SmartBuses on Stud Road (then-incomplete).
2. Creation of three of four orbital routes:
  1. Red Orbital: Route 700 extension – Box Hill to Altona – work commencing 2006;
  2. Green Orbital (Stage 2): Route 888/889 extension – Nunawading to Airport West – work commencing 2007–08;
  3. Yellow Orbital (Stage 2): Ringwood to Melbourne Airport – work commencing 2008–09.
3. Completion of Green and Blue Orbitals:
  1. Green Orbital (Stage 3): Route 888/889 extension – Airport West to Werribee – work commencing 2010–11.
  2. Blue Orbital: Sandringham to Williamstown – work commencing 2010–11.
4. Completion of SmartBus network.
  1. Work commencing 2011–12.

It is unclear exactly how far the SmartBus network would eventually have extended by Stage 4. Many corridors part of the Principal Public Transport Network were located outside the proposed orbital SmartBuses.

SmartBuses were finally introduced to Stud Road on 24 March 2008, with new Yellow Orbital Route 901 operating between Frankston and Ringwood. This service replaced previous routes 665 (Dandenong – Ringwood) and 830/831 (Dandenong – Frankston).

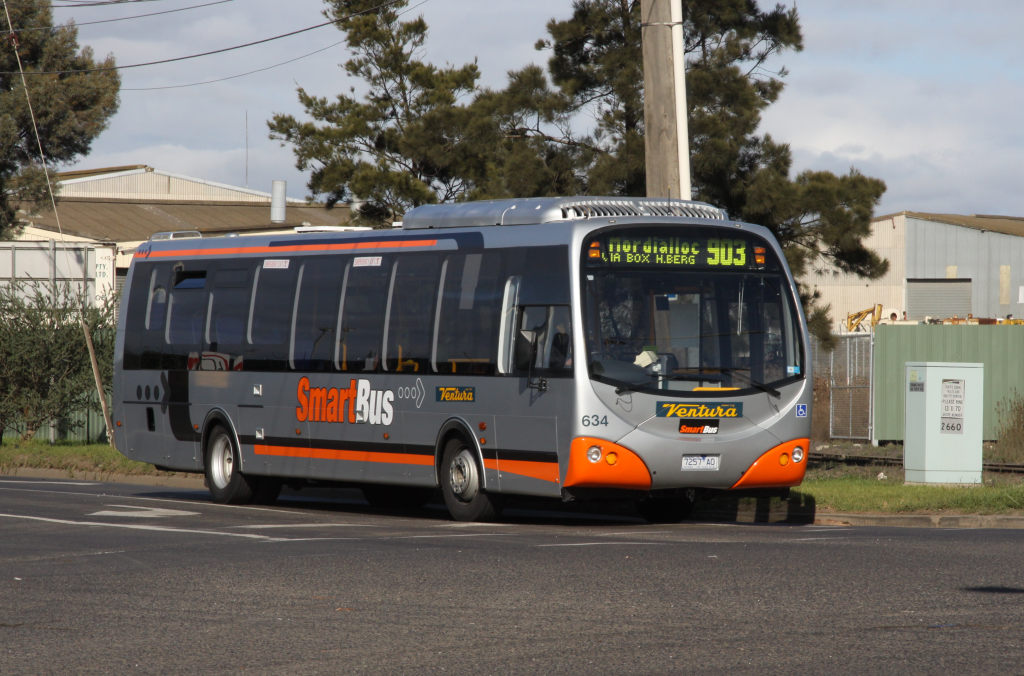
Ventura Bus Lines DesignLine bodied MAN 16.240 on route 903 in August 2009

On 20 April 2009, route 700 was extended to Altona via Heidelberg, Coburg and Essendon, becoming Red Orbital 903 (Altona – Mordialloc). The service replaced route 291 (Box Hill – Heidelberg) around Doncaster, but did not replace routes in other areas, creating significant overlaps.

On 5 April 2010, the Green Orbital began operation as Route 902 (Chelsea – Airport West). This route incorporated several sections of new or existing route, including:

- Grenda's Smartbus route 888/889 (Chelsea – Nunawading);
- a new alignment to Greensborough via Doncaster and Eltham;
- East West Bus Company route 560 (Greensborough – Broadmeadows);
- and a new alignment to Airport West via Westmeadows.

The Green Orbital connected nine railway stations, three tram routes and over 60 local bus routes, spanning 76 kilometres (47 mi). The completion of the route led to numerous local route changes, such as the implementing of a new local route 858 around Edithvale, an extension to route 735, and alterations to routes around Templestowe.

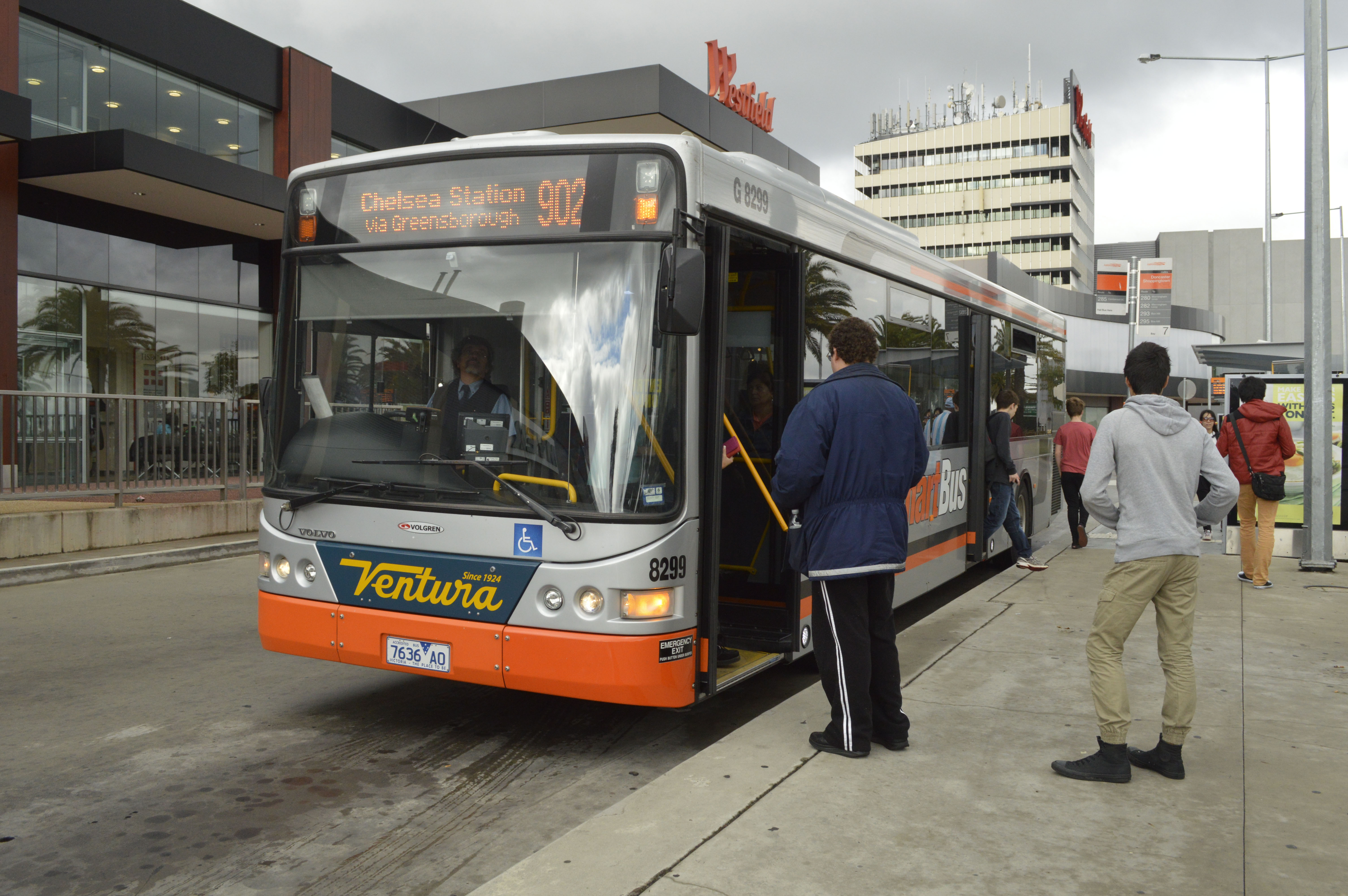
A Ventura Volvo B7RLE Smartbus operating a Route 902 to Chelsea at Westfield Doncaster

The proposed Green Orbital Phase 3 Airport West – Sydenham – Werribee extension was dumped from the Victorian Transport Plan in 2008, and downgraded to "potential" by 2009. Despite being shown on official maps as late as 2010, the extension was never completed.

On 26 September 2010, the Yellow Orbital was the last to be completed in Phase 2 when Route 901 was extended to Melbourne Airport. The extension included an extensive new alignment through Blackburn, The Pines Shopping Centre and Greensborough; and absorbed most of route 571 (South Morang – Roxburgh Park). The route connects with nine railway stations and over 100 bus routes, and at 115 kilometres long, Route 901 has a journey time of four and a half hours, making it Melbourne's second longest bus route after the Route 684 service between Ringwood and Eildon.

== Doncaster Area Rapid Transit ==
=== History ===
Though proposed since the 1880s, a Doncaster railway line has never been built, leaving the area reliant on buses for public transport.

=== Project ===
The Victorian Government's 2006 Meeting Our Transport Challenges report specifically discussed bus services in Doncaster. It noted that Doncaster's buses did not offer a service comparable to radial trains or trams despite a lack of alternate options in the area.

As a result, MOTC recommended the upgrading of bus services to Doncaster to a rail-like service. This eventually morphed into the Doncaster Area Rapid Transit (DART) program. This was officially announced when $360 million was allocated to improving Eastern Freeway bus services in December 2008, followed by a further $112 million in the 2009-10 state budget.

The DART project would see upgrades to the following routes:

- 301: The Pines – City (via Templestowe & Thompsons Road)
- 304: Warrandyte – City (via Blackburn Road & Eastern Freeway)
- 307: Mitcham – City (via Doncaster Road)
- 308/319: The Pines – City (via King St)

These routes would be heavily upgraded to the SmartBus standards. They would operate over longer hours (5am-12am weekdays, 6am-12am Saturdays, 7am-9pm Sundays); every 10 minutes during peak hours; and more frequently all throughout the week, going from 200 to 540 services each weekday. They would also receive other SmartBus technology and infrastructure upgrades, such as some real-time information and bus priority lanes. Finally, a new city terminus would be introduced at Lonsdale Street.

=== Implementation (2010) ===
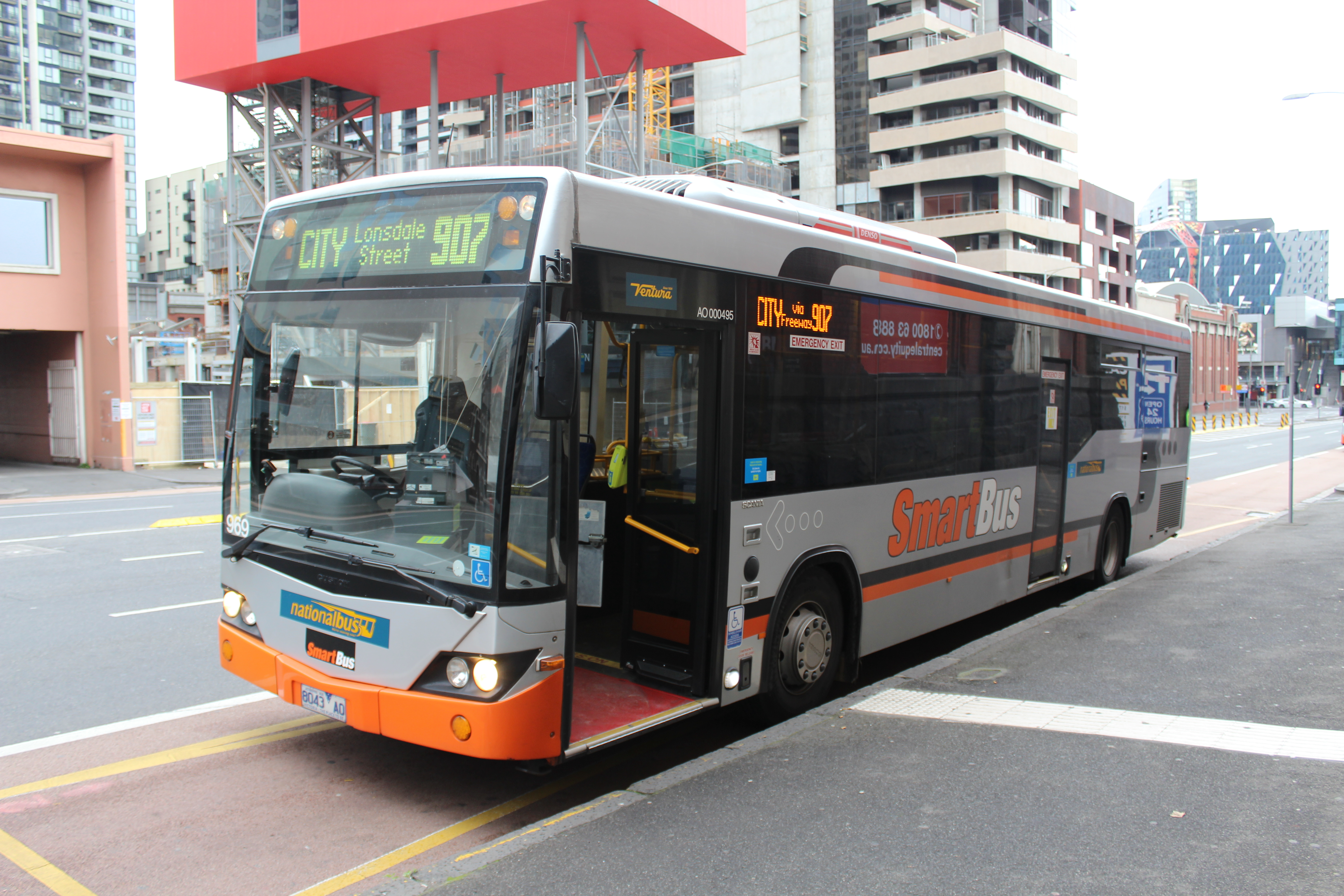
Ventura Bus Lines Scania K230UB (8043AO) operating route 907, Lonsdale St, 2013.

The new DART routes began operation on 4 October 2010. These were routes 905 (The Pines – City via Templestowe), 906 (Warrandyte/Ringwood – City), 907 (Mitcham – City), and 908 (The Pines – City via King St). This expanded the SmartBus network to 8 routes (and partial route 703), and are the most recent SmartBus routes launched as of 2026.

Significant changes occurred simultaneously to local routes. Route 303 and 306 merged into new 303 (City – Ringwood North); Route 305 was rerouted and terminated at The Pines in the off-peak; Route 313 was truncated at Doncaster Park & Ride; Route 316 was deleted; and Route 364 was deleted between Doncaster & Warrandyte.

=== Aftermath ===
By 2017, the DART routes had experienced significant patronage growth. Overall, patronage had grown 51% on weekdays, 79% on Saturdays and 72% on Sundays. On Route 907 in particular (Mitcham – City), weekend patronage had grown 150% on Saturdays and 194% on Sundays. Over 4.5 million trips were taken on DART routes in 2018/19.

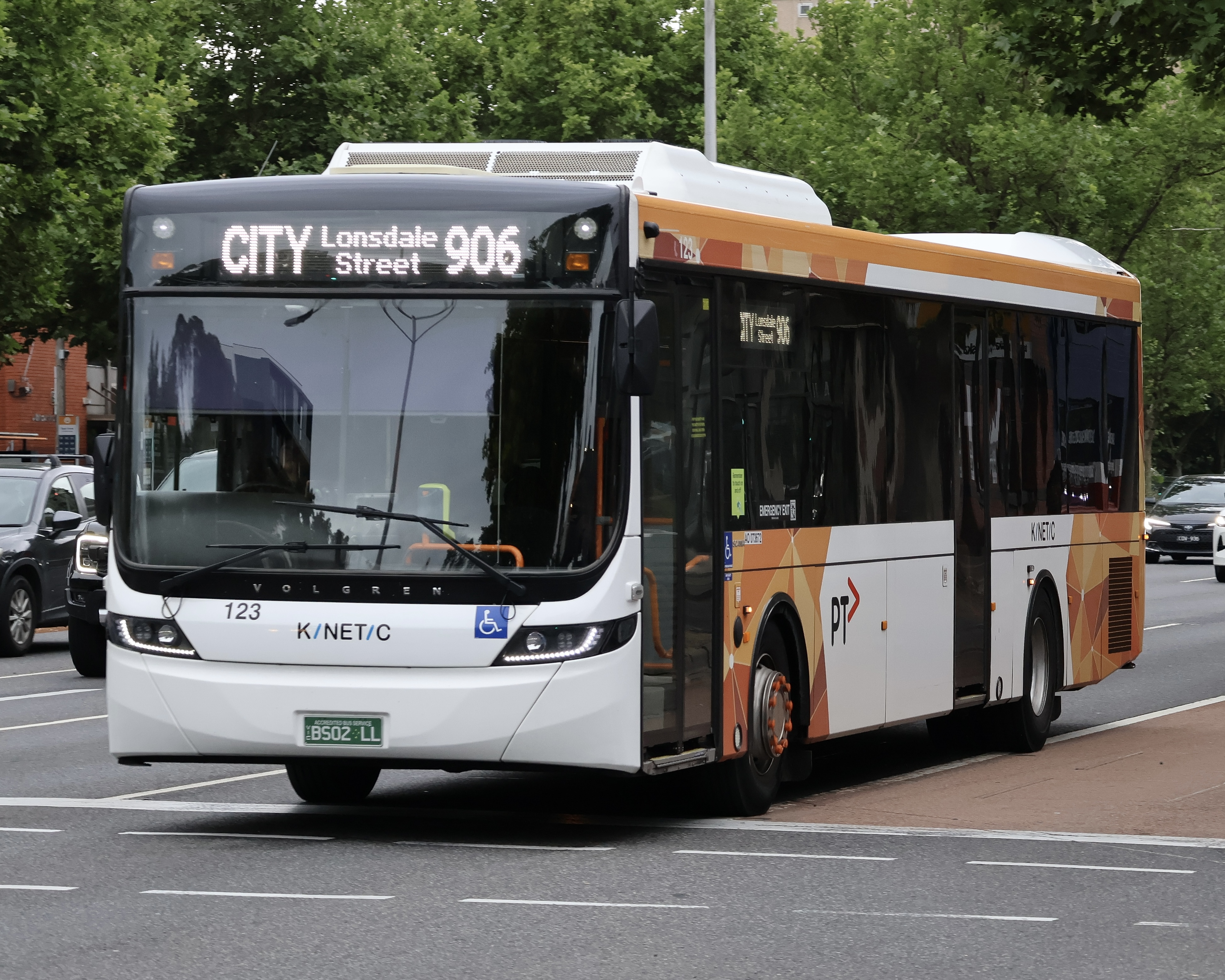
Kinetic Melbourne bus 123 operating Route 906 to the city (Lonsdale St) in Hoddle St, 2025

In 2015, new operator Transdev Melbourne began terminating route 908 services at Doncaster Park & Ride during the off-peak and weekends, leading to reductions in patronage.

The same year, a route alteration saw services use more of Victoria Parade to use new bus lanes, rather than Albert Street.

== Since 2010 ==
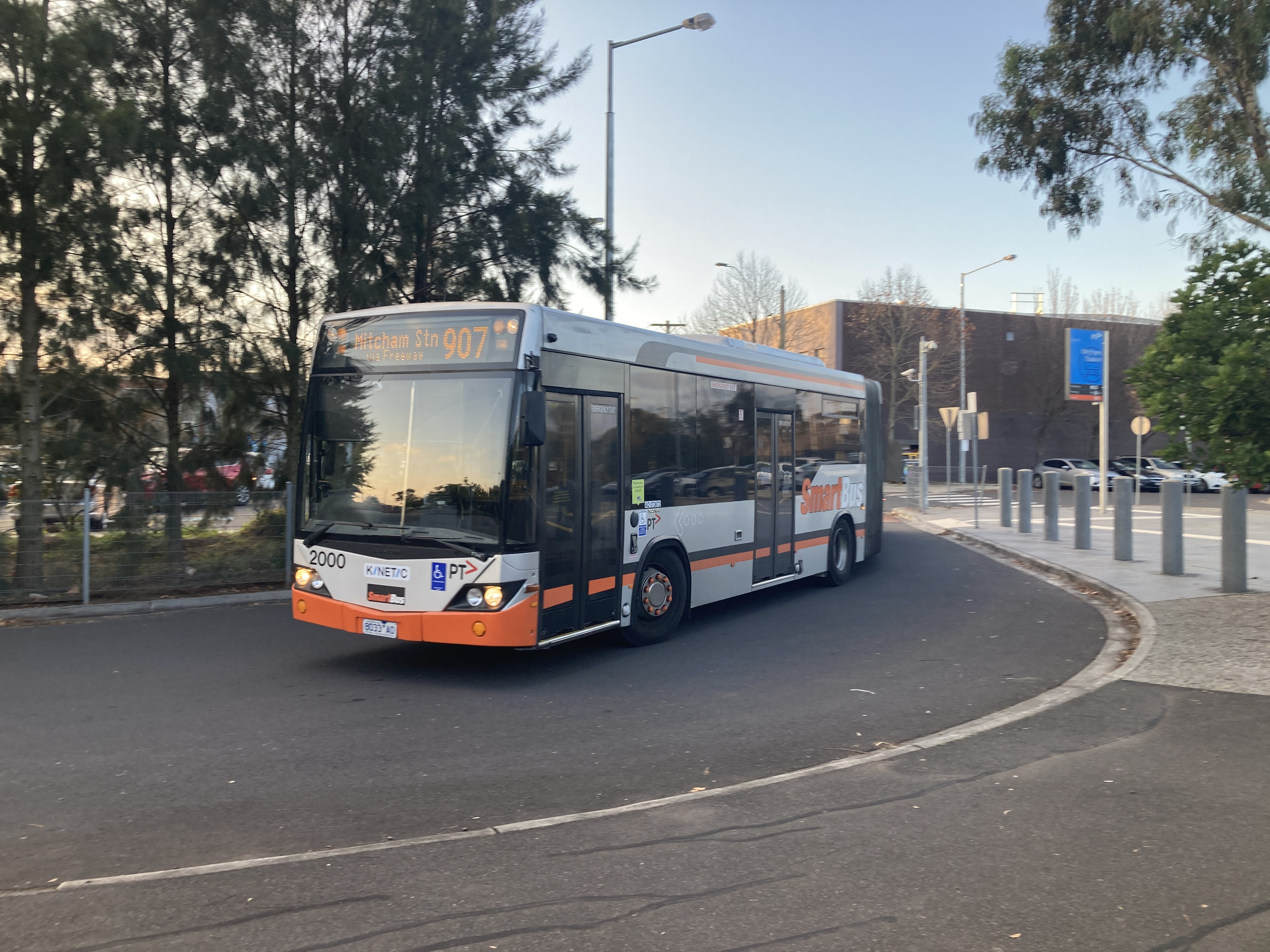
Kinetic Melbourne Custom Coaches bodied Scania K310UA on route 907 in July 2024. This is one of the only two articulated buses to bear the SmartBus livery

Between 2012 and 2013, all of the nine routes were operated by Ventura Bus Lines (with 900 to 902 jointly operated with other operators). Transdev Melbourne was awarded the Melbourne Metropolitan Bus Franchise, which included the three orbital and four DART routes, and took over the routes from Ventura in August 2013.

In late 2014, Transdev proposed to split the three orbital routes into seven routes, as part of a planned network change in 2015. In April 2015, the proposed network change, including the splitting of the orbial routes, was rejected by the newly elected Andrews Labor government.

In 2014, The Age revealed leaked plans to drastically expand the SmartBus network by 2021. Routes would run every 10 minutes during daytime hours, and there would be at least 35 SmartBuses by 2021 and 49 by 2031.

Advocate Daniel Bowen provided more detail on the plans. Public Transport Victoria expected the following routes to be SmartBuses by 2030:

Leaked SmartBus Plans (2014)
Year	Routes
2021	Existing SmartBuses: 703, 900, 901, 902, 903, 905, 906, 907, 908; Upgrade of existing routes: 207, 215, 216, 238, 246, 251, 400, 406, 446, 468, 472, 478, 506, 510, 548, 561, 624, 630, 691, 732, 737, 791, 822, 828, 841; New SmartBuses: SM6, SM7, SM11, SM16, SM18, SM24, SM25, SM052, SM-902e
2031	2021 plus: Upgrade of existing routes: 562, 788, 926; New SmartBuses: SM15, SM19, SM054, SM130

The upgrades did not occur.

In January 2022, Kinetic Melbourne succeeded Transdev as new franchise operator of the Melbourne Metropolitan Bus Franchise and took over the three orbital and four DART routes.

== Network ==
=== 703: Middle Brighton to Blackburn ===
703

Overview
- Operator: Ventura Bus Lines
- Garage: Oakleigh South Depot
- Began service: February 1961 / 5 August 2002 (SmartBus)
- Night-time: Friday/Saturday

Route
- Start: Middle Brighton
- Via: Bentleigh station Centre Road; Clayton station Monash University; Syndal station Blackburn Road some services via Forest Hill Chase
- End: Blackburn
- Length: 25.9 km
- Other routes: Night Network: 703☽ Middle Brighton to Blackburn via Clayton does not deviate via Forest Hill Chase

Service
- Frequency: 10-15 minutes (weekday daytime); 60 minutes (weekday evenings)
- Weekend frequency: 30 minutes (daytime); 60 minutes (early weekend mornings)
- Journey time: 81-86 minutes
- Annual patronage: 2.6 million (2023)
- Timetable

Route 703 operates from Middle Brighton to Blackburn, via Forest Hill Chase Shopping Centre, Monash University, Clayton station & Bentleigh station.

It is operated by Ventura Bus Lines.

The official SmartBus section is only north of Clayton, although PIDs are installed at Bentleigh. Service levels are not as high as on other SmartBus routes, especially along Centre Rd segment.

=== 900: Caulfield to Stud Park (Rowville) ===
900

Overview
- Operator: Ventura Bus Lines; CDC Melbourne
- Garage: Oakleigh Depot (CDC); Knoxfield Depot (Ventura)
- Began service: 16 October 2006
- Night-time: Friday/Saturday

Route
- Start: Caulfield
- Via: Chadstone Shopping Centre; Oakleigh station Huntingdale station Monash University; Waverley Park
- End: Stud Park Shopping Centre (Rowville)
- Length: 25.9 km
- Stops: Limited stops
- Other routes: Night Network: 900☽ Oakleigh to Stud Park (Rowville) does not operate to Caulfield via Chadstone

Service
- Frequency: 10 minutes (weekday peak); 15 minutes (weekday daytime); 30 minutes (weekday early morning and evenings)
- Weekend frequency: 30 minutes (daytime); 60 minutes (early weekend mornings)
- Journey time: 51-53 minutes
- Annual patronage: 1.92 million (2017)
- Timetable

Route 900 operates from Caulfield station to Stud Park Shopping Centre (Rowville), via Waverley Park, Monash University & Chadstone Shopping Centre.

It is operated by CDC Melbourne and Ventura Bus Lines.

The route is a limited stops service.

=== 901: Frankston to Melbourne Airport ===
901

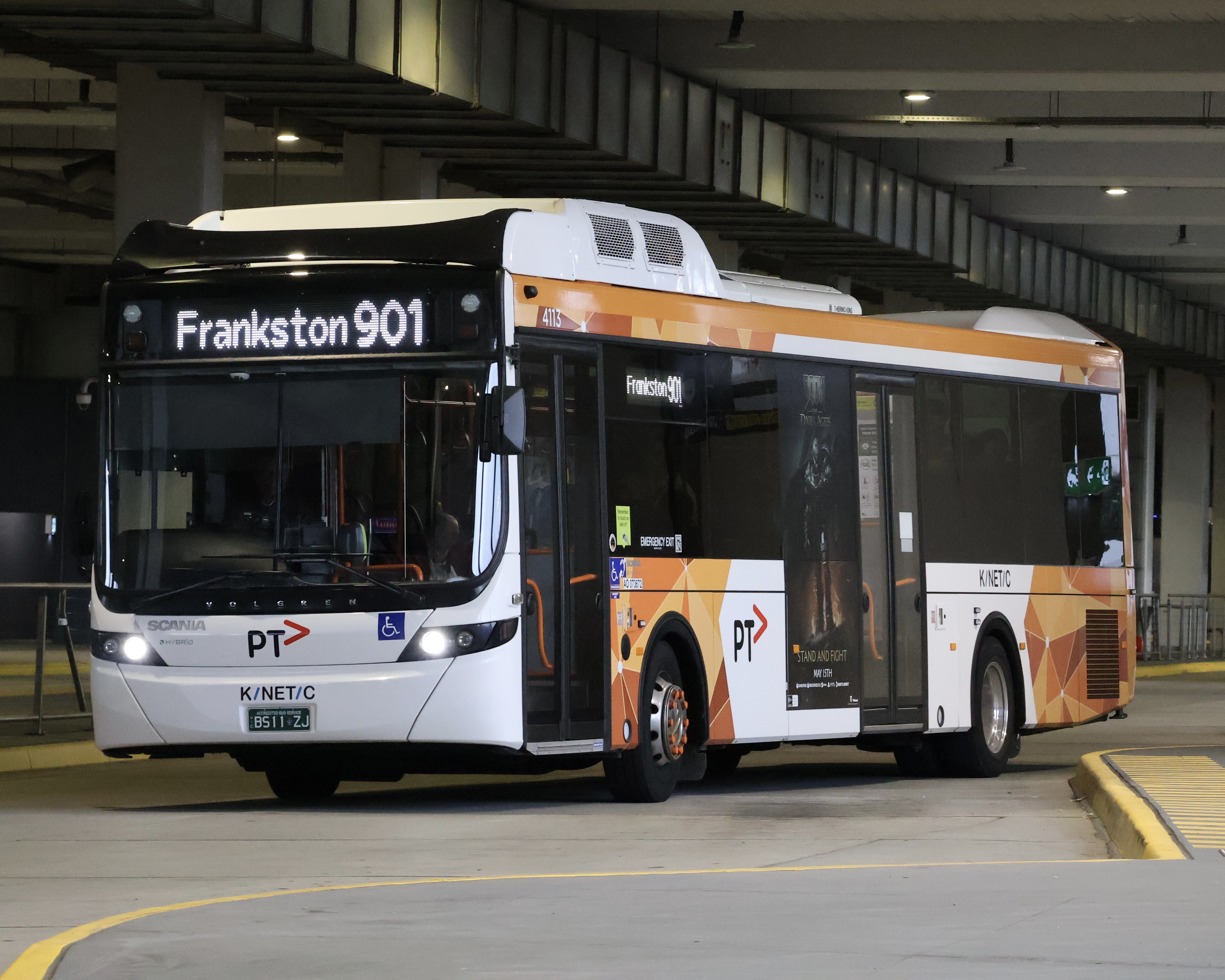
- Kinetic Melbourne Volgren Optimus bodied Scania K320HB at Melbourne Airport in December 2025

Overview
- Operator: Kinetic Melbourne
- Garage: Doncaster, Thomastown and Keysborough Depots
- Began service: 24 March 2008
- Night-time: Friday/Saturday (partial)

Route
- Start: Frankston
- Via: Dandenong station Westfield Knox; Ringwood station Blackburn station The Pines Shopping Centre; Greensborough station South Morang station Roxburgh Park station Broadmeadows station
- End: Melbourne Airport
- Length: 115 kilometres
- Other routes: Night Network: 901☽ Dandenong to Ringwood

Service
- Frequency: 15 minutes (weekday daytime); 30 minutes (weekday early morning and evenings)
- Weekend frequency: 30 minutes (daytime); 60 minutes (early weekend mornings)
- Journey time: 4-5 hours
- Annual patronage: 3.34 million (2018-19)
- Timetable

Route 901 runs from Frankston station to Melbourne Airport, with major destinations including Dandenong station, Ringwood station, Greensborough station, Epping station, Roxburgh Park station & Broadmeadows station. It is operated by Kinetic Melbourne, and forms the Yellow Orbital.

Route 901 originally commenced on 24 March 2008, merging route 665 (Ringwood - Dandenong) with route 830/831 (Dandenong - Frankston). Commencing at Frankston Station on Young St, it travels over the Frankston line near Kananook station to reach Frankston–Dandenong Road, which it follows to Dandenong South via Carrum Downs, crossing the Dandenong Creek and Cranbourne/Pakenham line at Dandenong station.

North of Dandenong, it follows Stud Road to Stud Park Shopping Centre in Rowville, connecting to route 900, and Westfield Knox (Wantirna South). It then links to Ringwood station via Wantirna Road.

On 26 September 2010, the route was extended to Melbourne Airport from Ringwood. Operating west via the Maroondah Highway to Blackburn station, it travels north along Blackburn Road to The Pines SC, west along Reynolds Road to Templestowe, and north-west to Greensborough station via Para Road. From Greensborough, the route turned north-east via Diamond Creek Road, Plenty and Gorge Road to South Morang station.

Between South Morang and Roxburgh Park, route 901 replaced former route 571, operating via Epping station, Pacific Epping and Somerton. Finally, route 901 operates via Pascoe Vale Road to Broadmeadows Station via Coolaroo, and Westmeadows to its terminus at Melbourne Airport.

Initially operated by East West Bus Company, Ventura Bus Lines and Grenda's Bus Services, Transdev Melbourne took over operations in 2013, themselves followed by Kinetic Melbourne in January 2022.

=== 902: Chelsea to Airport West ===
902

Overview
- Operator: Kinetic Melbourne
- Garage: Doncaster, Thomastown and Keysborough Depots
- Began service: 5 April 2010

Route
- Start: Chelsea station
- Via: Springvale station Glen Waverley station Nunawading station Westfield Doncaster; Eltham station Greensborough station Keon Park station Campbellfield; Broadmeadows station Gladstone Park
- End: Airport West
- Length: 76 kilometres

Service
- Frequency: 15 minutes (weekday daytime); 30 minutes (weekday early morning and evenings)
- Weekend frequency: 30 minutes
- Journey time: 3 hours
- Annual patronage: 3.7 million (2017)
- Timetable

Route 902 operates from Chelsea station to Airport West, via Springvale, Glen Waverley station, Nunawading station, Westfield Doncaster, Eltham station, Greensborough Plaza, Campbellfield, Broadmeadows station & Gladstone Park.

It is operated by Kinetic Melbourne.

It forms the Green Orbital.

=== 903: Mordialloc to Altona ===
903

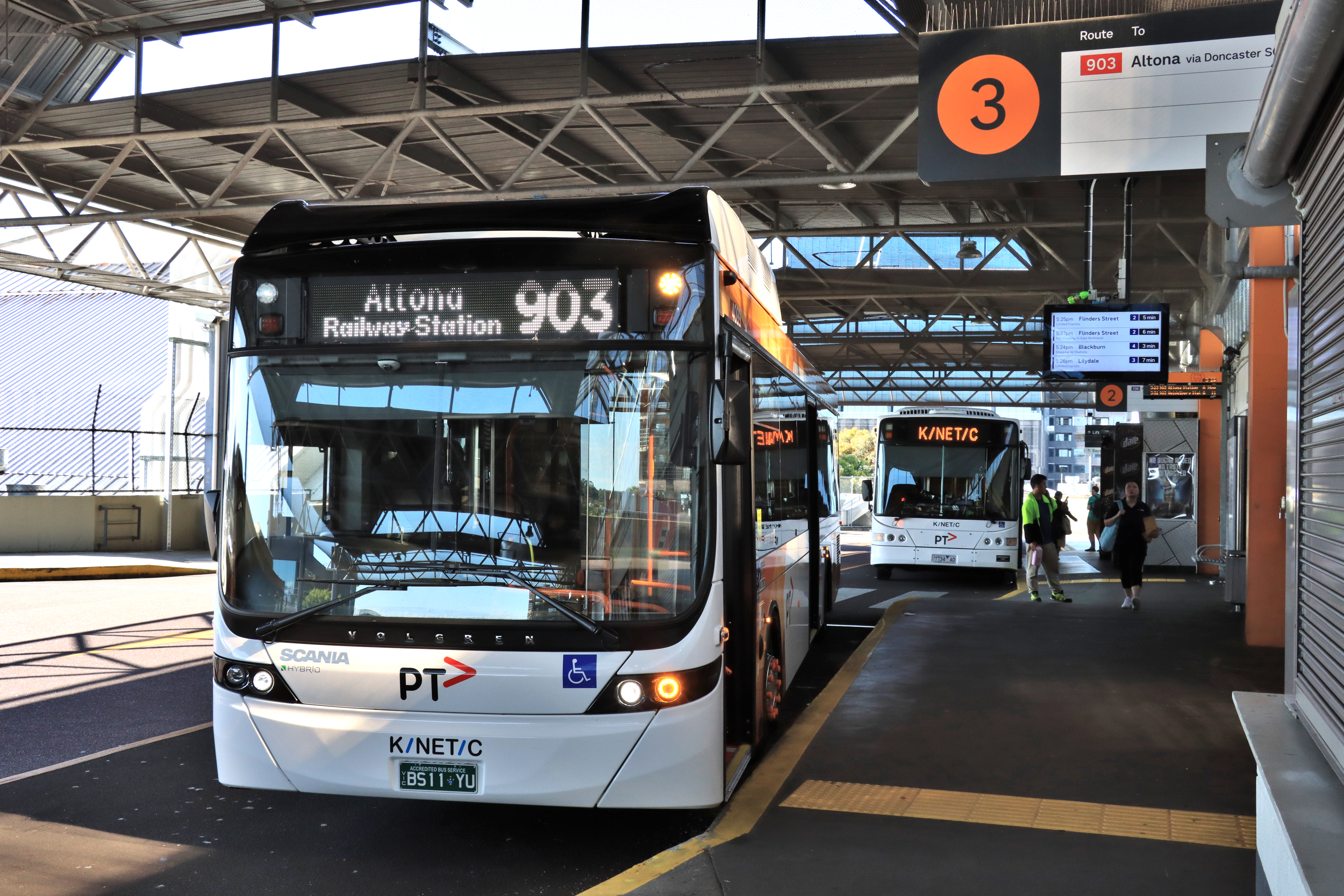
- Kinetic hybrid bus #4099 operating a route 903 service to Altona waiting to depart Bay 3 at Box Hill Bus Station

Overview
- Operator: Kinetic Melbourne
- Garage: Doncaster, Heatherton, Preston and Sunshine West Depots
- Began service: 20 April 2009

Route
- Start: Mordialloc station
- Via: Mentone station Oakleigh station Chadstone Shopping Centre; Deakin University; Box Hill station Westfield Doncaster; Heidelberg station Northland Shopping Centre; Preston station Coburg station Essendon station Sunshine station Altona North
- End: Altona station
- Length: 86 kilometres

Service
- Frequency: 8-10 minutes (weekday peak hours); 15 minutes (weekday daytime); 30 minutes (weekday early morning and evenings)
- Weekend frequency: 10-30 minutes (Saturdays); 30 minutes (Sundays)
- Journey time: 3-4 hours
- Annual patronage: 5.06 million (2017)
- Timetable

Route 903 operates from Altona station to Mordialloc, via Sunshine station, Essendon station, Preston station, Northland Shopping Centre, Heidelberg station, Westfield Doncaster, Box Hill Central, Deakin University (Burwood Campus), Chadstone Shopping Centre & Mentone station.

It is operated by Kinetic Melbourne.

It forms the Red Orbital.

Some services terminate at Box Hill, Heidelberg, Essendon or Sunshine, towards Altona, or either Mentone or Oakleigh towards Mordialloc instead.

When it was first introduced, Route 903 connected to 11 railway stations and 9 tram lines, and was 86 kilometres (53 mi) in length.

=== 905: City (Lonsdale Street) to The Pines via Templestowe ===
905

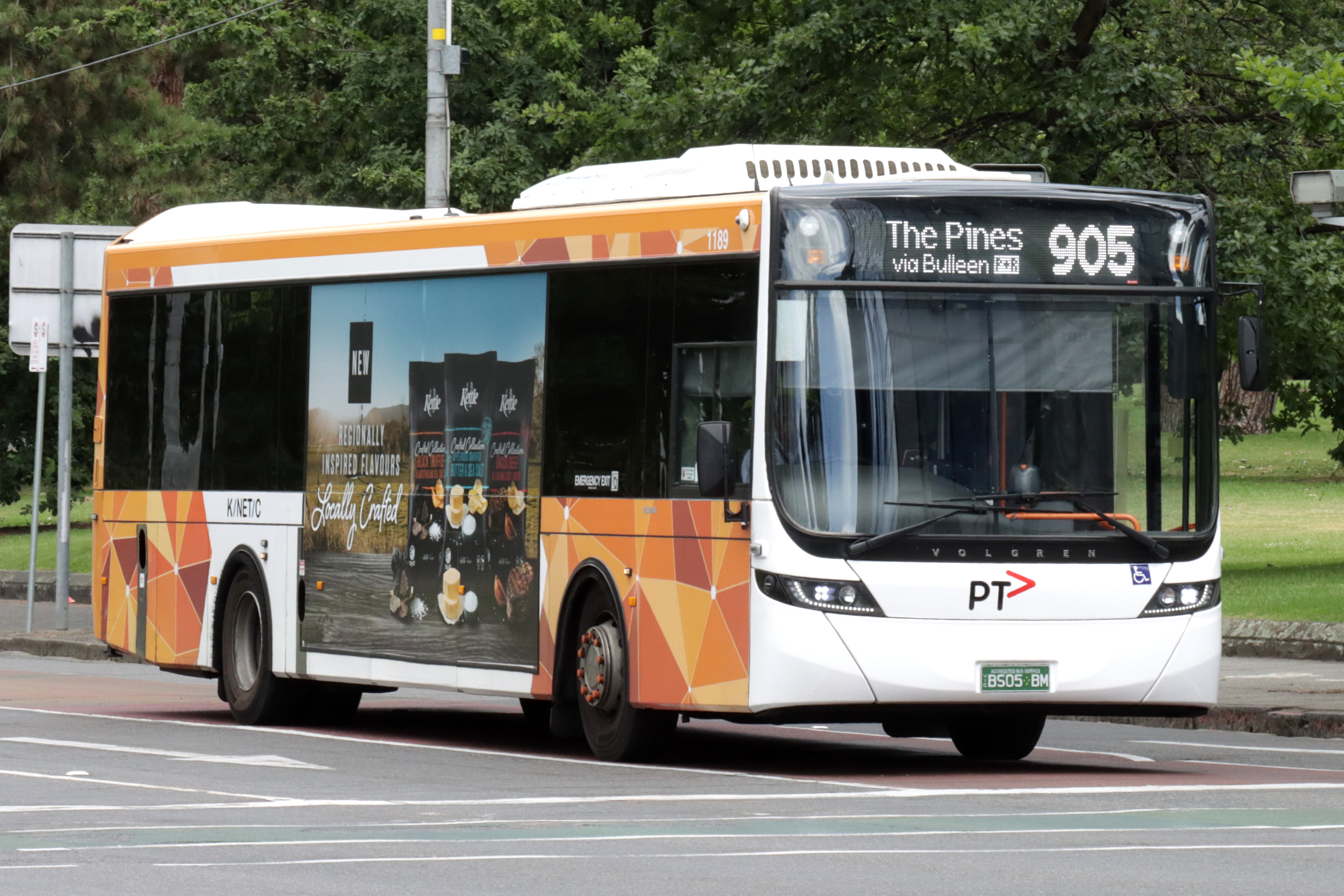
- Kinetic bus -1189 operating Route 905 to The Pines via Bulleen Park & Ride at Victoria Parade & Nicholson Street, Carlton

Overview
- Operator: Kinetic Melbourne
- Garage: Doncaster Depot
- Began service: 4 October 2010
- Predecessors: 301 (City – The Pines SC via Templestowe) ceased 4 October 2010
- Night-time: Friday/Saturday

Route
- Start: City (Lonsdale Street)
- Via: Victoria Parade; Hoddle Street; Eastern Freeway; Bulleen Park & Ride; Templestowe
- End: The Pines Shopping Centre
- Length: 24.4 kilometres
- Other routes: Night Network: 905☽ City – The Pines via Templestowe

Service
- Frequency: 5-10 minutes (weekday peak hours); 15 minutes (weekday daytime); 30 minutes (weekday early morning and evenings)
- Weekend frequency: 15 minutes (weekend daytime); 30 minutes (weekend mornings and evenings); 60 minutes (early weekend mornings)
- Journey time: 45-70 minutes
- Annual patronage: 1.26 million (2019)
- Timetable

Route 905 is a DART service operating from City (Lonsdale Street) to The Pines Shopping Centre, via the Eastern Freeway exiting at Bulleen Road, and Templestowe.

It is operated by Kinetic Melbourne.

=== 906: City (Lonsdale Street) to Warrandyte ===
906

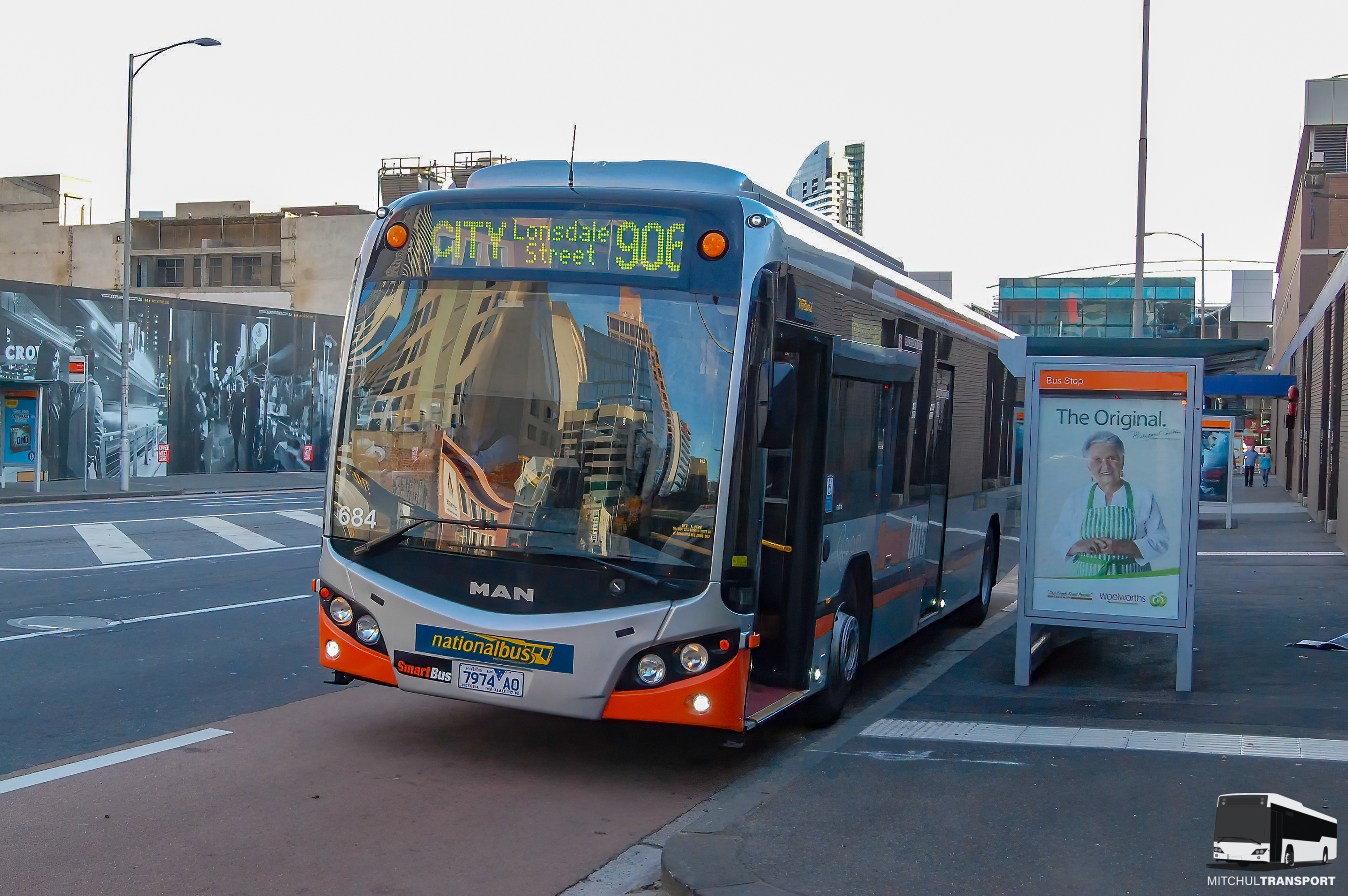
- Ventura Bus Lines Man 18.31 CB80 (7974AO) operating route 906 to Lonsdale Street in the Melbourne CBD, 2011

Overview
- Operator: Kinetic Melbourne
- Garage: Doncaster Depot
- Began service: 4 October 2010
- Predecessors: 304 (City – Warrandyte via Blackburn Road & Freeway) ceased 4 October 2010

Route
- Start: City (Lonsdale Street)
- Via: Victoria Parade; Hoddle Street; Eastern Freeway; Blackburn Road; The Pines Shopping Centre
- End: Warrandyte
- Length: 33.3 kilometres

Service
- Frequency: 5-10 minutes (weekday peak hours); 15 minutes (weekday daytime); 30 minutes (weekday early morning and evenings)
- Weekend frequency: 30 minutes
- Journey time: 45-76 minutes
- Annual patronage: 1.2 million (2018-19)
- Timetable

Route 906 operates from the City (Lonsdale Street) to Warrandyte, via the Eastern Freeway, exiting at Blackburn Road, and The Pines Shopping Centre.

It is operated by Kinetic Melbourne.

=== 907: City (Lonsdale Street) to Mitcham ===
907

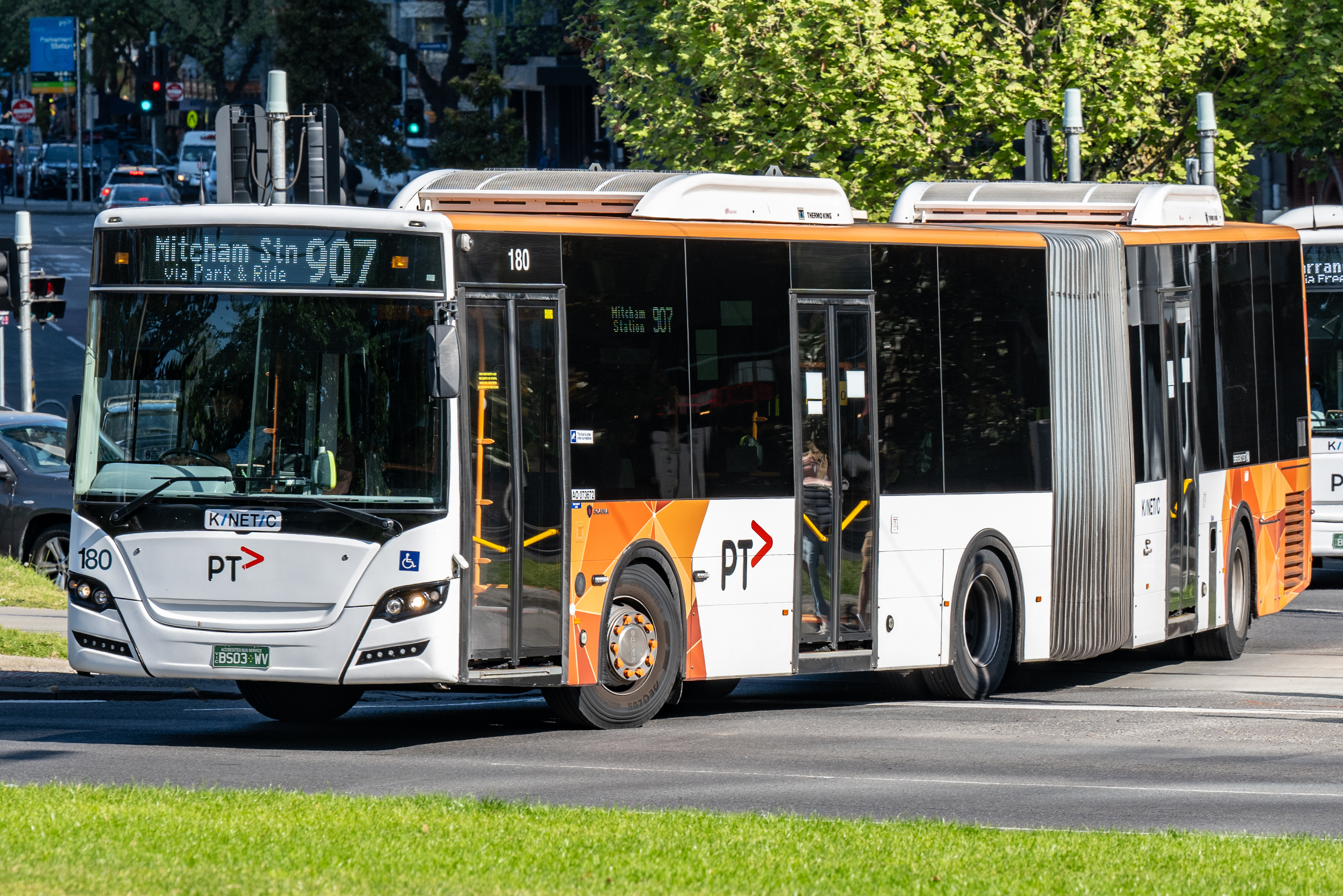
- Kinetic Scania K360UA operating route 907 to Mitcham, at Spring Street & Victoria Parade, 2023

Overview
- Operator: Kinetic Melbourne
- Garage: Doncaster Depot
- Began service: 4 October 2010
- Predecessors: 307 (City – Mitcham via Doncaster Road) ceased 4 October 2010
- Night-time: Friday/Saturday

Route
- Start: City (Lonsdale Street)
- Via: Victoria Parade; Hoddle Street; Eastern Freeway; Doncaster Park & Ride; Doncaster Road
- End: Mitcham station
- Length: 26.2 kilometres
- Other routes: Night Network: 907☽ City – Mitcham via Doncaster

Service
- Frequency: 4-8 minutes (weekday peak hours); 15 minutes (weekday daytime); 30 minutes (weekday early morning and evenings)
- Weekend frequency: 15 minutes (weekend daytime); 30 minutes (weekend mornings and evenings); 60 minutes (early weekend mornings)
- Journey time: 45-70 minutes
- Annual patronage: 1.79 million (2017)
- Timetable

Route 907 operates from the City (Lonsdale Street) to Mitcham, via the Eastern Freeway, exiting at Doncaster Road, Doncaster Park & Ride and Donvale.

It is operated by Kinetic Melbourne.

=== 908: City (Lonsdale Street) to The Pines via High Street ===
908

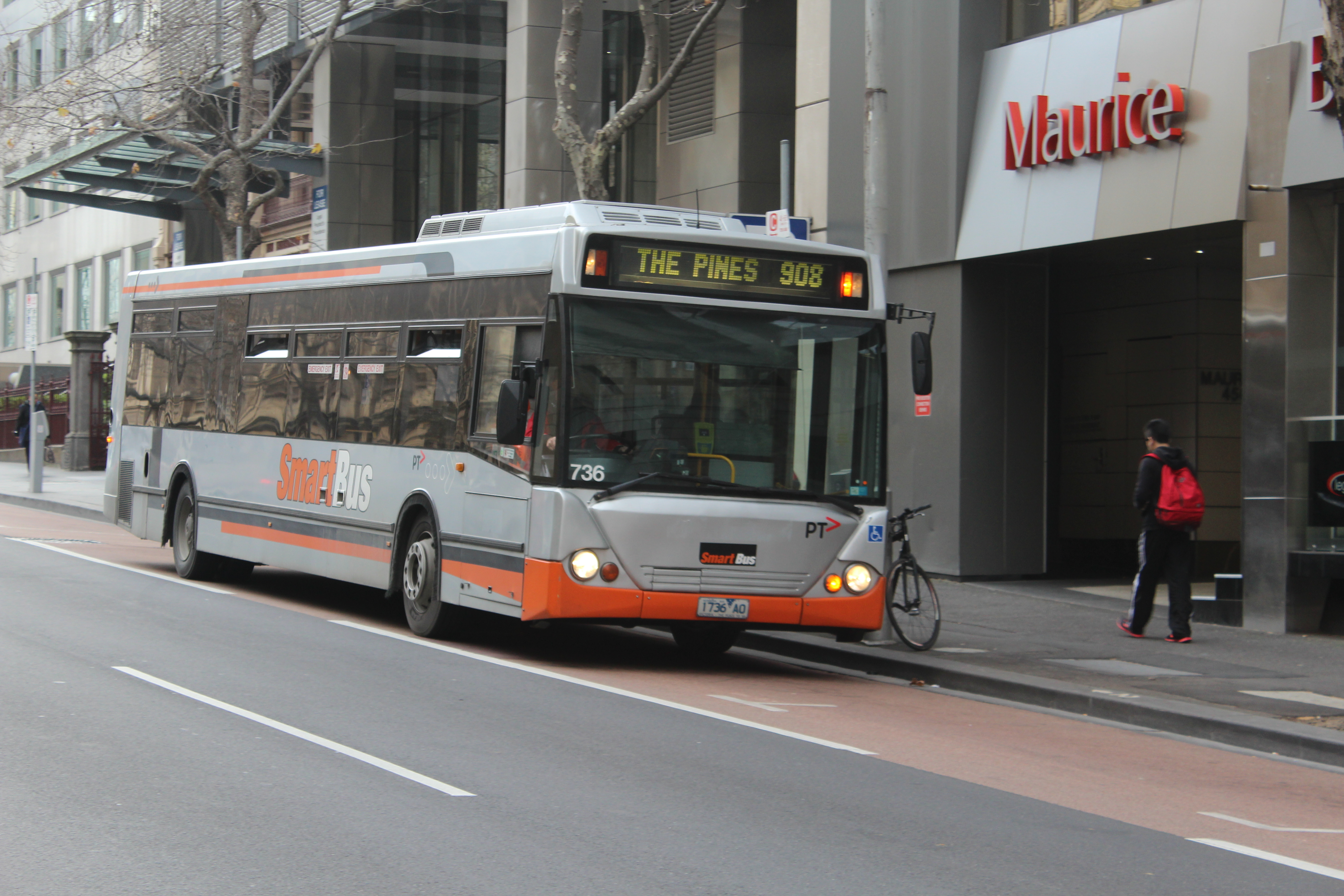
- Transdev Melbourne Mercedes Benz O405NH no. 736 (1736AO) operating route 908 to The Pines, in Lonsdale St (CBD), 2013

Overview
- Operator: Kinetic Melbourne
- Garage: Doncaster Depot
- Began service: 4 October 2010
- Predecessors: 308/319 (City – The Pines via King & High Streets) ceased 4 October 2010
- Night-time: Friday/Saturday (partial)

Route
- Start: City (Lonsdale Street) (weekday peak only); Doncaster Park & Ride (all other times)
- Via: Victoria Parade; Hoddle Street; Eastern Freeway; Doncaster Park & Ride; High Street; King Street
- End: The Pines Shopping Centre
- Length: 24.7 kilometres
- Other routes: Night Network: 908☽ Doncaster Park & Ride – The Pines via King Street

Service
- Frequency: 10 minutes (weekday peak hours); 15 minutes (weekday daytime); 30 minutes (weekday early morning and evenings)
- Weekend frequency: 30 minutes (weekend daytime); 60 minutes (early weekend mornings)
- Journey time: 46-66 minutes (full route); 15-20 minutes (short route)
- Annual patronage: 601,658 (2018-19)
- Timetable

Route 908 operates from the City (Lonsdale Street) to The Pines Shopping Centre, via the Eastern Freeway, exiting at Doncaster Road, Doncaster Park & Ride, and King Street. Off-peak and weekend trips terminate at Doncaster Park & Ride.

It is operated by Kinetic Melbourne.

== Operations ==
=== Services ===
SmartBus routes operate from 5:00am to midnight from Monday to Saturday and from 6:00am to 9:00pm on Sundays, Good Friday and Christmas Day. Most services run the full route however, some services on the three orbital routes and off-peak services route 908 may serve shorter runs. SmartBus services usually serve most stops however, route 900 instead offers a limited express service, only stopping at major stops along the route.

Frequencies on the nine routes are higher than most bus routes on the network, will vary throughout the day and go as follows.

- 30 minute frequencies between 5:00am and 6:30am
- 15 minute frequencies between 6:30am and 9:00pm on routes 703, 901, 902 and 903
- 10 minute frequencies (or higher) between 6:30am and 9:00pm on routes 900, 905, 906, 907 and 908
- 30 minute frequencies from 8:30pm and 12:00am
- 30 minute frequencies on weekends and public holidays
- 60 minute frequencies on Night Network services

=== Operators ===
Route	2002–2005	2005–2008	2008–2010		2010–2013		2013–2022	2022–now
703	Ventura Bus Lines (2002–present)							
900	N/A	Grenda's Bus Services and Eastrans (2006–2012)				Ventura Bus Lines and Eastrans (2012–2014)	Ventura Bus Lines and CDC Melbourne (2014–present)	
901	N/A (Non-Smartbus routes 665 and 830/831)		Grenda's Bus Services and Invicta Bus Services (2008–2009)	Grenda's Bus Services (2009–2010)	Grenda's Bus Services and East West Bus Company (2010–2012)	Ventura Bus Lines and East West Bus Company (2012–2013)	Transdev Melbourne (2013–2022)	Kinetic Melbourne (2022–present)
902	Grenda's Bus Services (2002–2010 as Smartbus 888/889)				Grenda's Bus Services and East West Bus Company (2010–2012)	Ventura Bus Lines and East West Bus Company (2012–2013)	Transdev Melbourne (2013–2022)	Kinetic Melbourne (2022–present)
903	N/A	Ventura Bus Lines (2005–2009 as Smartbus 700)		Ventura Bus Lines (2009–2013)			Transdev Melbourne (2013–2022)	Kinetic Melbourne (2022–present)
905	N/A				Ventura Bus Lines (2010–2013)		Transdev Melbourne (2013–2022)	Kinetic Melbourne (2022–present)
906	N/A				Ventura Bus Lines (2010–2013)		Transdev Melbourne (2013–2022)	Kinetic Melbourne (2022–present)
907	N/A				Ventura Bus Lines (2010–2013)		Transdev Melbourne (2013–2022)	Kinetic Melbourne (2022–present)
908	N/A				Ventura Bus Lines (2010–2013)		Transdev Melbourne (2013–2022)	Kinetic Melbourne (2022–present)

== Infrastructure ==
=== Buses ===
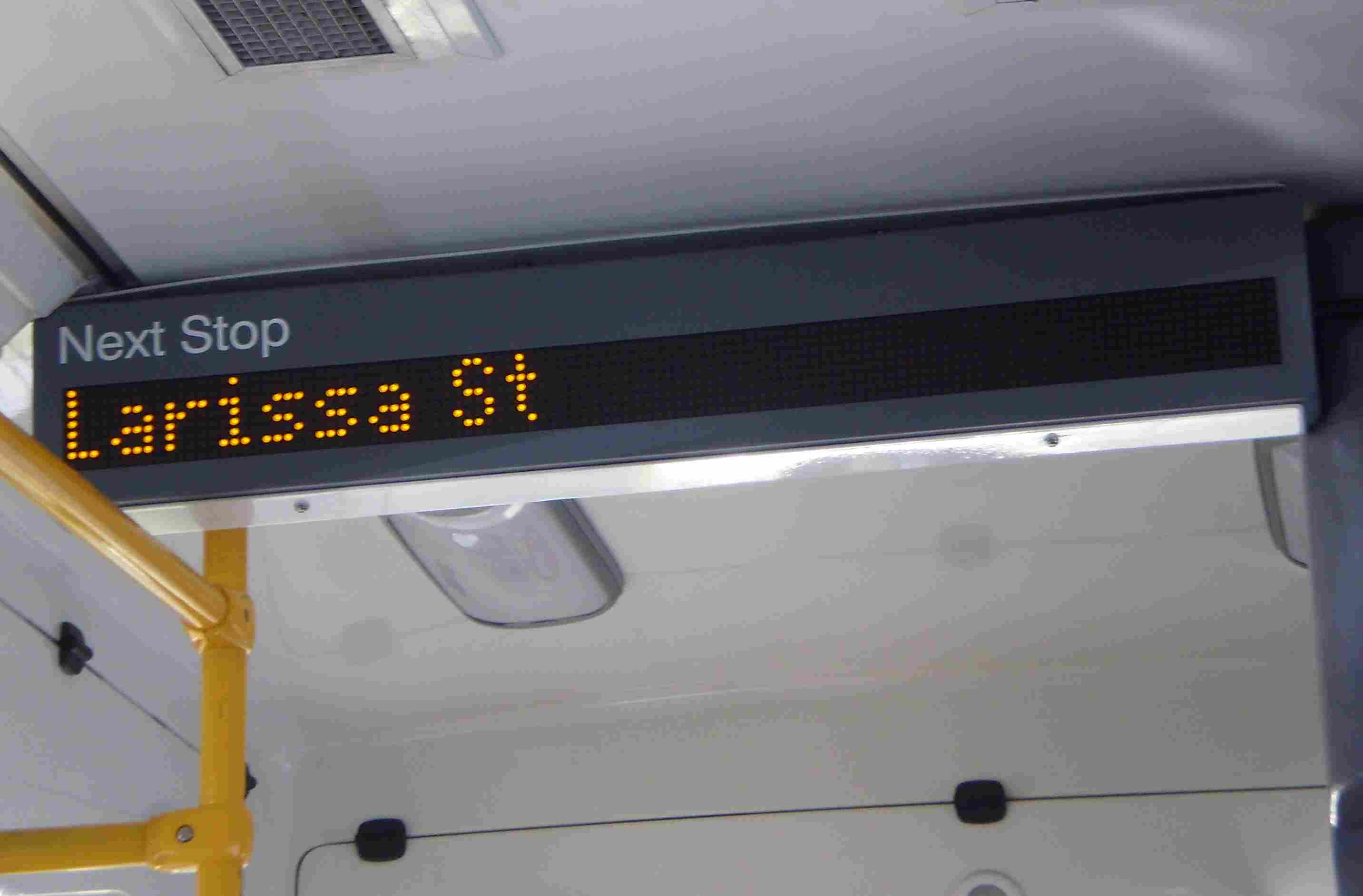
A "next stop" display in a Ventura SmartBus

Originally, SmartBus routes used a dedicated fleet of low-entry buses painted in the grey SmartBus livery. The first batch of SmartBus liveried buses were Mercedes-Benz OC500LEs delivered in 2006 and 2007 by Eastrans and Grenda's for route 900. However, since then, most of these buses have been displaced onto non-SmartBus routes and replaced by Gemilang Coachworks and Volgren bodied and Scania K320UBs painted in the orange PTV livery. Buses dedicated to SmartBus operations, regardless of livery, feature PIDS inside of the bus, which shows the next stop. In 2022, Kinetic Melbourne began running electric buses on 901, 902 and 903.

=== Bus stops ===
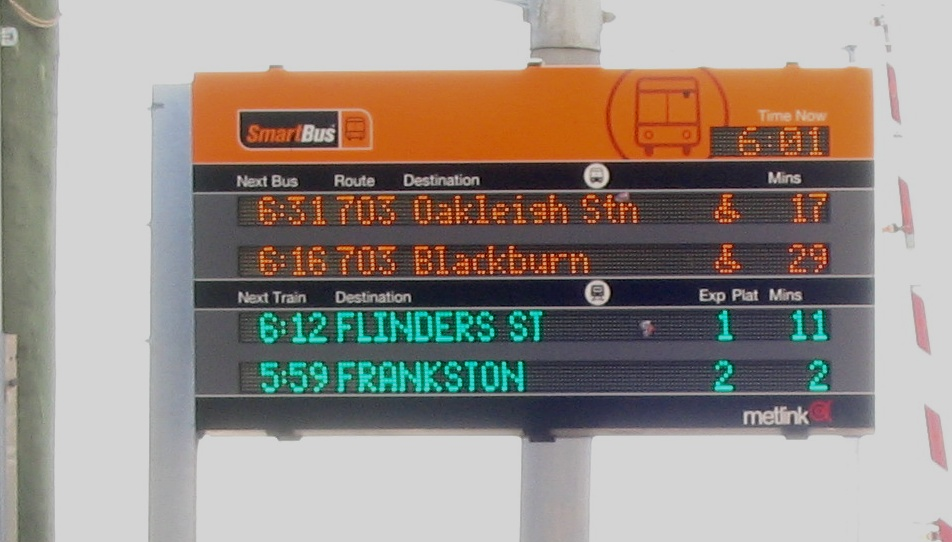
A SmartBus route 703 PID at Bentleigh

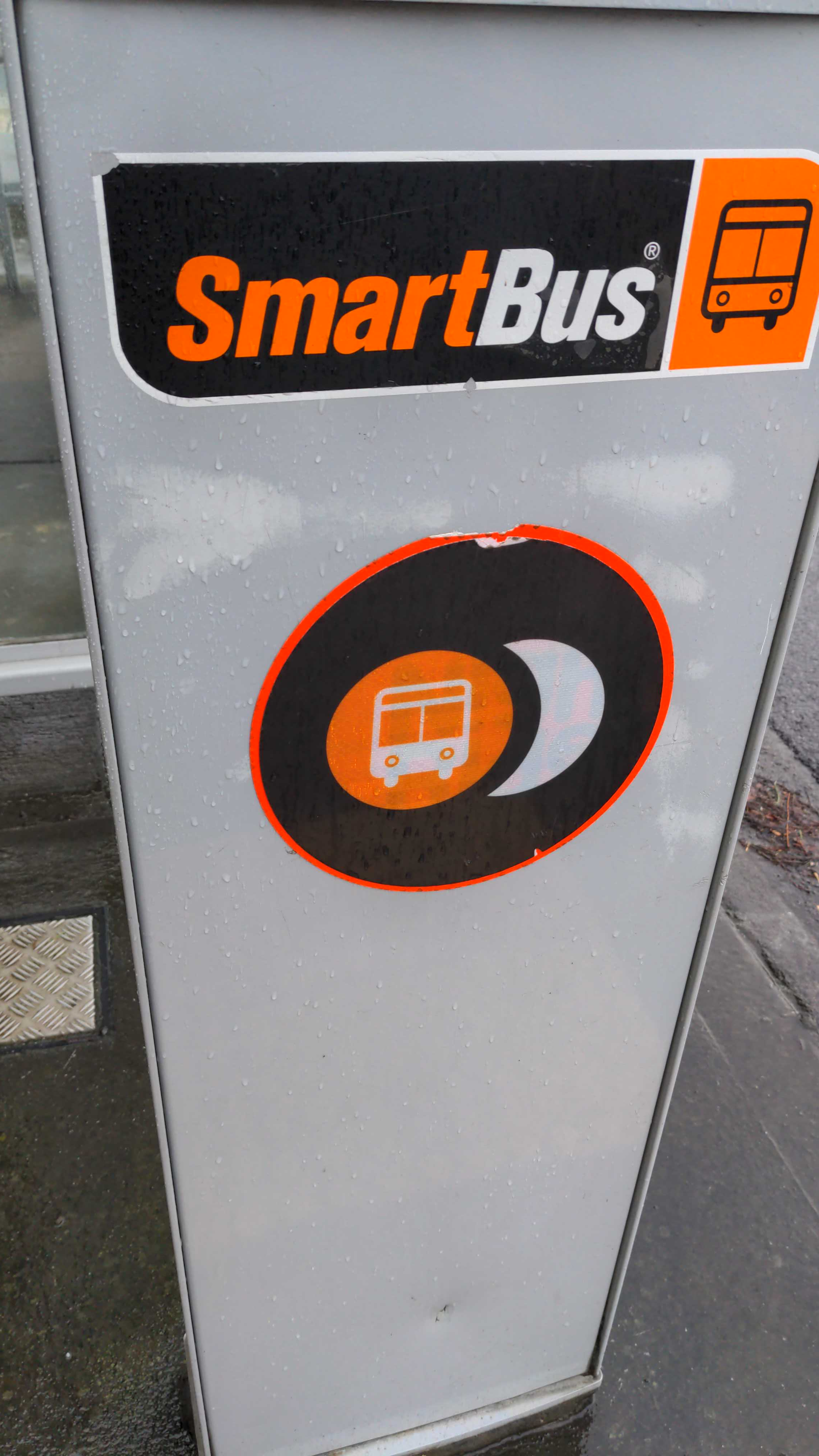
Smartbus totem with a Night Bus logo, Box Hill North

SmartBus bus stops offer a variety of premium features not usually present at non-Smartbus bus stops. All SmartBus bus stops feature totems, with some including real time PIDs embedded into them. Additionally, major bus stops may include shelters, bins, and real time passenger information displays. These displays will show the next departures of each SmartBus route and at railway stations will additionally show the next departures of rail services.

=== Signalling ===
SmartBus corridors use more modern signalling which is not common on non-SmartBus routes. The location of buses is tracked using GPS satellite receivers fitted to the bus, which relay this information to the network control centre. Many traffic lights on SmartBus corridors are fitted with bus signal priority equipment, to allow for buses to change signals ahead to speed up their journey. The information from both systems is also commonly used when operating PIDs, when accounting for delays and earlier arrivals.

== Analysis and criticism ==
SmartBus had been criticised for being not par with world bus rapid transit system standards, such as segregating from car lanes via a separated roadway, working traffic light bus priority and better real-time information screens.

A Blue Orbital (route 904), was proposed in the 2006 Meeting our Transport Challenges publication, which proposed to service the inner city from Sandringham to Williamstown, however this proposed route was cut from the 2008 Victorian Transport Plan, with the route not mentioned in text or maps.

== Proposals ==
In 2010, bus lobby group BusVic proposed a substantial expansion to the SmartBus network. This would have included:

- 220 (Ballarat Road: City – Sunshine);
- 250 (Port Melbourne – City – La Trobe Uni);
- 630 (Elwood – Monash University, extended Elwood – St Kilda – Port Melbourne);
- 693 (Oakleigh – Ferntree Gully);
- 703 (SmartBus upgrade on whole route, particularly Clayton – Brighton)
- 790/791/841 (Frankston – Cranbourne – Fountain Gate);
- 828 (Sandringham – Southland – Keysborough – Dandenong – Berwick).

Route 900 was also proposed to be extended east to Ferntree Gully.

== See also ==
- Metrobus (Sydney)
