= Stud Park Shopping Centre =

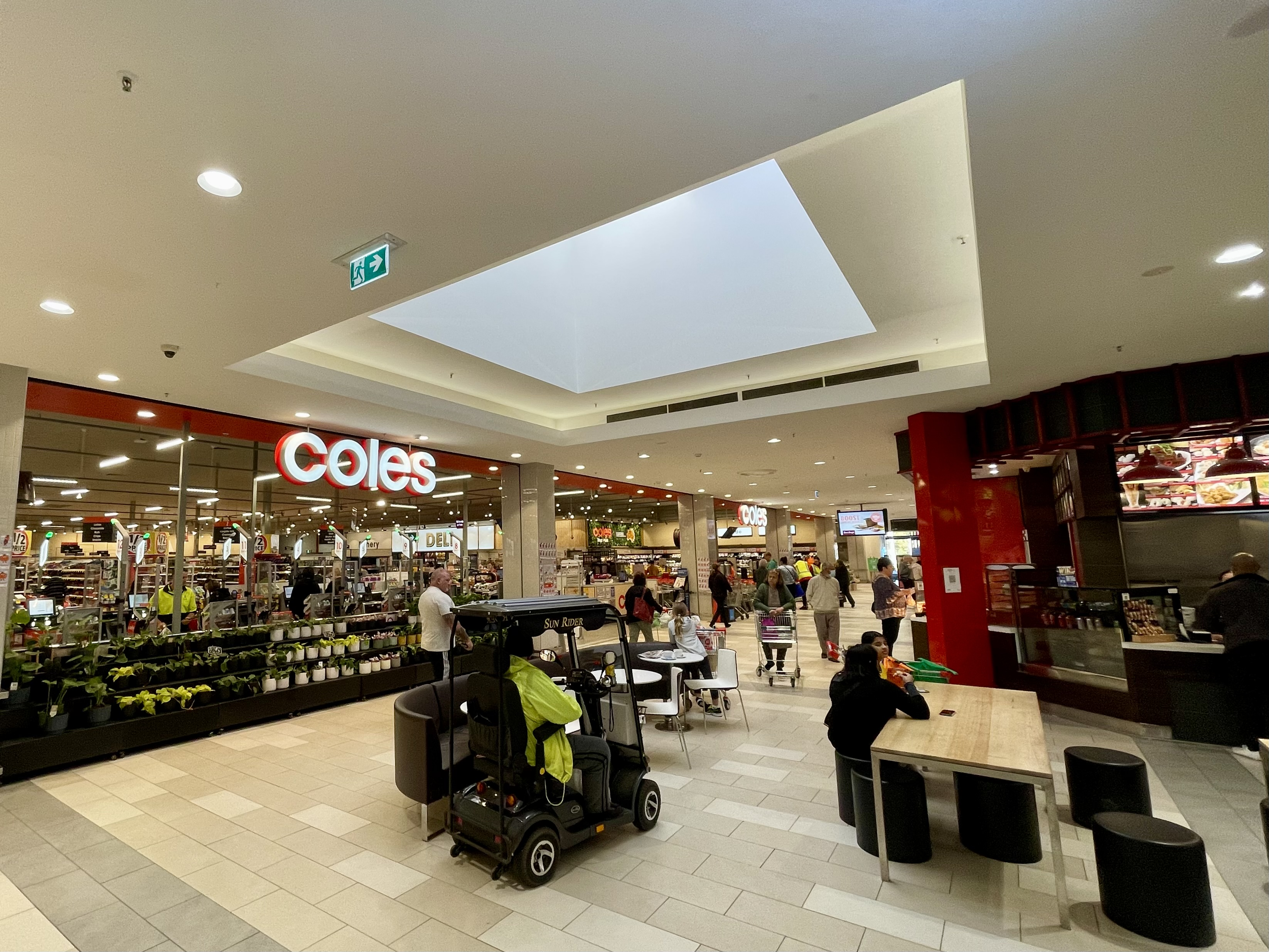
- The mall interior facing the Coles supermarket.
- Location: Rowville, Victoria, Australia
- Coordinates: 37.920304°S 145.235023°E
- Address: 1101 Stud Road, Rowville VIC 3178
- Opened: July 17, 1989
- Developer: Consulere Developments
- Manager: Dexus
- Owner: Dexus (Wholesale Australian Property Fund)
- Num. of stores: 61
- Num. of anchor tenants: 3
- Floor area: 27,000 m^{2} (290,000 sq ft)
- Floors: 1
- Parking: 1,500+
- Website: studparksc.com.au

Stud Park Shopping Centre is a sub-regional shopping centre located in the suburb of Rowville, in the outer eastern suburbs of Melbourne, Victoria, Australia. Situated approximately 27 kilometres (17 mi) south-east of the Melbourne CBD, it is the largest commercial hub in the City of Knox's southern corridor.

The centre serves a primary trade area of nearly 30,000 residents and records an annual footfall exceeding 6.8 million movements. It is designated as a "Major Activity Centre" (MAC) within the municipal planning scheme.

Stud Park is locally notable for its role in state infrastructure planning, having been designated for decades as the proposed terminus for the unbuilt Rowville railway line. Consequently, the centre functions as a major bus interchange for the region.

== History ==
=== Origins and planning ===
The site of the shopping centre was originally part of the Stamford Park estate, a pastoral run established in 1882 by the Row family, after whom the suburb is named. For much of the 20th century, the land remained rural, used primarily for grazing and horse agistment.

The shopping centre was developed by Consulere Developments at a reported cost of A$35 million. As a condition of the planning permit, the developer was required to fully fund the signalisation of the intersection at Stud Road and Fulham Road to handle the anticipated traffic increase.

During construction, the project was provisionally referred to in administrative records as "Darryl Park Shopping Centre". This name was abandoned prior to the launch in favour of "Stud Park". Mrs. Jennifer de Vos was appointed as the inaugural Centre Manager in May 1989.

=== Opening and the "Super Kmart" reversal ===
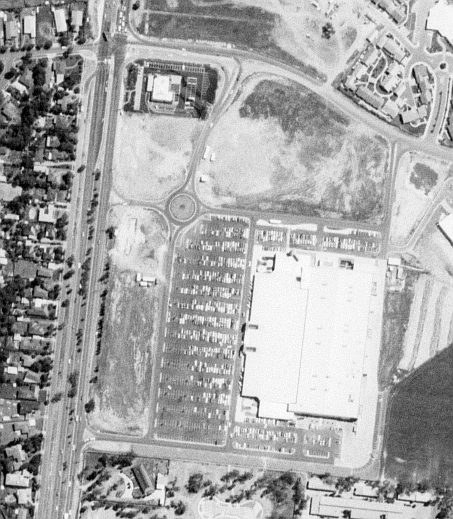
An aerial image of Stud Park Shopping Centre, taken on December 9, 1989

Stud Park Shopping Centre officially opened on 17 July 1989 with the marketing slogan "...more than just a place to shop". However, the Rowville Library, which was integrated into the complex, opened to the public a month earlier on 19 June 1989.

The centre's design is a notable example of a late-stage architectural pivot. Advertisements from as late as April 1989 explicitly stated that the centre would open with a "Super Kmart hypermarket"—a Coles Myer concept combining a discount department store and supermarket into a large store.

However, on 12 May 1989, Coles Myer announced the discontinuation of the Super Kmart store format. Consequently, the large retail space was retrofitted with an internal dividing wall to separate the space into two distinct stores: a Coles New World supermarket and a Kmart discount department store. This structural division remains in the current building layout.

=== Original tenants ===
The opening tenant mix in July 1989 included 39 specialty shops. Inaugural retailers included:

- Banks: State Bank of Victoria, Westpac, Commonwealth Bank
- Retail: Just Jeans, Amcal Chemist, Toy Kingdom, Williams The Shoeman, Hosking The Jeweller, Pets Paradise
- Services: Fountain Flicks (video rental), Non Stop Video, Spectacle Place, Ward Spinks Estate Agency
- Food: Wendy's Supa Sundaes, Donut King, Oriental Fast Food, Canterbury Tales Hot Bread.

=== Expansion and legal disputes ===
In late 1992, the centre was purchased for A$32 million by Stud Park Investments, an investment vehicle controlled by James Gray and Leigh Johnson, principals of the Clarendon Property Group. The centre was sold by its original joint owners, Knox City Council and Brian Della-Pietra's Consulere Developments.

Under this new ownership, the centre underwent a significant expansion programme involving the construction of two freestanding buildings to the north and west. This was facilitated by an amendment to the Knox Planning Scheme, gazetted on 5 August 1993, which increased the site's permitted gross leasable floor area from 13,000 square metres (140,000 sq ft) to 22,000 square metres (240,000 sq ft) and, crucially, reduced the mandatory car parking ratio from 8 spaces to 6 spaces per 100 square metres (1,100 sq ft).

==== The Safeway dispute ====
The construction of the South-West Precinct (the current Woolworths building) was the subject of bitter litigation between the owners and anchor tenant Kmart Australia. The dispute originated in 1993 when Kmart objected to the encroachment of the proposed building onto its parking leasehold. While an initial settlement was reached in August 1993, the owners subsequently demolished the partially built structure to construct a larger, 4,500-square-metre (48,000 sq ft) supermarket intended for Safeway.

Kmart sued in the Supreme Court of Victoria, arguing this larger design breached the earlier settlement and reduced Kmart's visibility. On 14 October 1994, the full bench of the Supreme Court granted an injunction restraining the owners from leasing the new building to Safeway. This prevented the store from meeting its scheduled December 1994 opening.

To circumvent the planning objections raised by Kmart, the owners sought "Amendment L82" to the Knox Planning Scheme, asking the Minister for Planning to explicitly designate the new building's footprint as a "Supermarket" rather than "Peripheral Sales" (bulky goods). An Independent Panel hearing was convened in December 1994. Kmart and Coles Myer vigorously opposed the amendment, arguing that the building was constructed unlawfully and that a standalone supermarket would "fragment" the centre. Safeway and the owners argued that a second supermarket would increase competition and consumer choice.

In January 1995, the Panel recommended approval of the amendment, ruling that the planning merits of a second supermarket outweighed the history of the dispute. However, the Panel required the owners to enter into a Section 173 agreement to guarantee the future construction of a pedestrian link (Stage 3) connecting the new supermarket to the existing mall. Due to the leasehold disputes with Coles Myer, this "Stage 3" link was ultimately realized only as an uncovered, open-air walkway through the car park, rather than the fully integrated arcade originally envisioned.

==== Financial and access litigation ====
In 1996, the centre's owners were involved in further litigation, this time with the Knox City Council. The dispute originated from the 1987 sale of the land by the Council to Stud Park Investments (SPI) for A$5 million, half of which was deferred. The Council alleged it had not received interest payments on this debt and sought "non-party discovery" of the owner's financial records to investigate allegations that revenue was being diverted to "related party transactions" benefiting companies controlled by the directors (such as Graywinter Properties).

In 2009, a separate dispute arose regarding the site at 1091–1101 Stud Road, which sits adjacent to the centre's western boundary but is titled separately. The site formerly housed a service station (often recalled locally as an Ampol) which was demolished to make way for a three-storey office and retail development. The centre's then-owners, ING Real Estate, successfully objected to the proposal by denying the developers legal access to the centre's private "Northern Access Road" (the entry near the bus interchange). The Victorian Civil and Administrative Tribunal (VCAT) refused the permit, citing "fatally convoluted" access arrangements and existing traffic congestion. The site was eventually redeveloped and now houses a Chemist Warehouse and medical centre.

==== The Northern Precinct and Mitre 10 ====
The expansion also included a Northern Precinct, featuring a large format building that originally housed Mitre 10, which opened in August 1993. The store was the subject of a contemporary report—later featured in a 2025 Four Corners documentary—which cited it as an example of an independent retailer "in battle" against a Bunnings Warehouse "being planned for just down the road". This competition foreshadowed the store's closure in circa May 2001; the space was subsequently tenanted by the New Zealand discount chain The Warehouse, known for its distinctive "yellow shed" branding. This building is currently occupied by PetO (formerly Best Friends Pets) and smaller tenancies.

=== Ownership changes ===
The financial disputes of the late 1990s were resolved in October 1998 when the centre was sold to the Armstrong Jones Retail Fund for A$58.75 million. The sale price allowed for the discharge of debts and represented a capital gain of approximately A$27 million for the vendors. Ownership later transitioned to ING Real Estate via its acquisition of the Armstrong Jones management platform. In 2010, the centre was acquired by Lendlease as part of a A$1.4 billion portfolio purchase of the ING Retail Property Fund Australia.

In August 2015, Lendlease sold the centre to AMP Capital for A$154 million, a price that reflected high demand for "defensive" non-discretionary retail assets. Following corporate restructuring, ownership transferred to Dexus in 2022/2023. As of June 2025, Dexus valued the centre at A$142 million.

== Layout ==
The centre sits on a large open site dominated by surface car parking. The layout is fragmented into three primary zones, a legacy of the staged development approved by the 1995 Planning Panel:

- The Main Centre (South-East): An enclosed mall housing Coles, Kmart, the Rowville Library, and the majority of specialty stores.
- The Woolworths Building (South-West): A detached supermarket building. It is not physically connected to the main building; access is via an uncovered, open-air walkway through the car park.
- The Northern Precinct: A strip of large-format retailers and fast-food pad sites.

The Rowville Plan 2015, a strategic planning document by Knox City Council, identified this fragmented, car-dominated design as lacking engagement with the street. The plan proposes a long-term "Main Street" vision, aiming to activate the Fulham Road frontage with shopfronts and dining, and to create a designated "Town Square" to physically link the retail precinct with the adjacent Rowville Community Centre and Library.

== Tenants ==
Stud Park Shopping Centre has a total floor area of 27,000 square metres (290,000 sq ft). As of June 2025, the centre maintained an occupancy rate of 98.5%.

Major traders include:

- Coles supermarket
- Kmart discount department store
- Woolworths supermarket (with attached BWS liquor store)
- Liquorland
- PetO (Pet supplies store)
- Henrys Mercato (Fresh food grocer)

The centre also integrates civic facilities, including the Rowville Library (operated by Your Library), functioning as the de facto civic heart of the suburb. The Rowville Community Centre and Rowville Police Station also sit adjacent to the centre.

== Transport ==
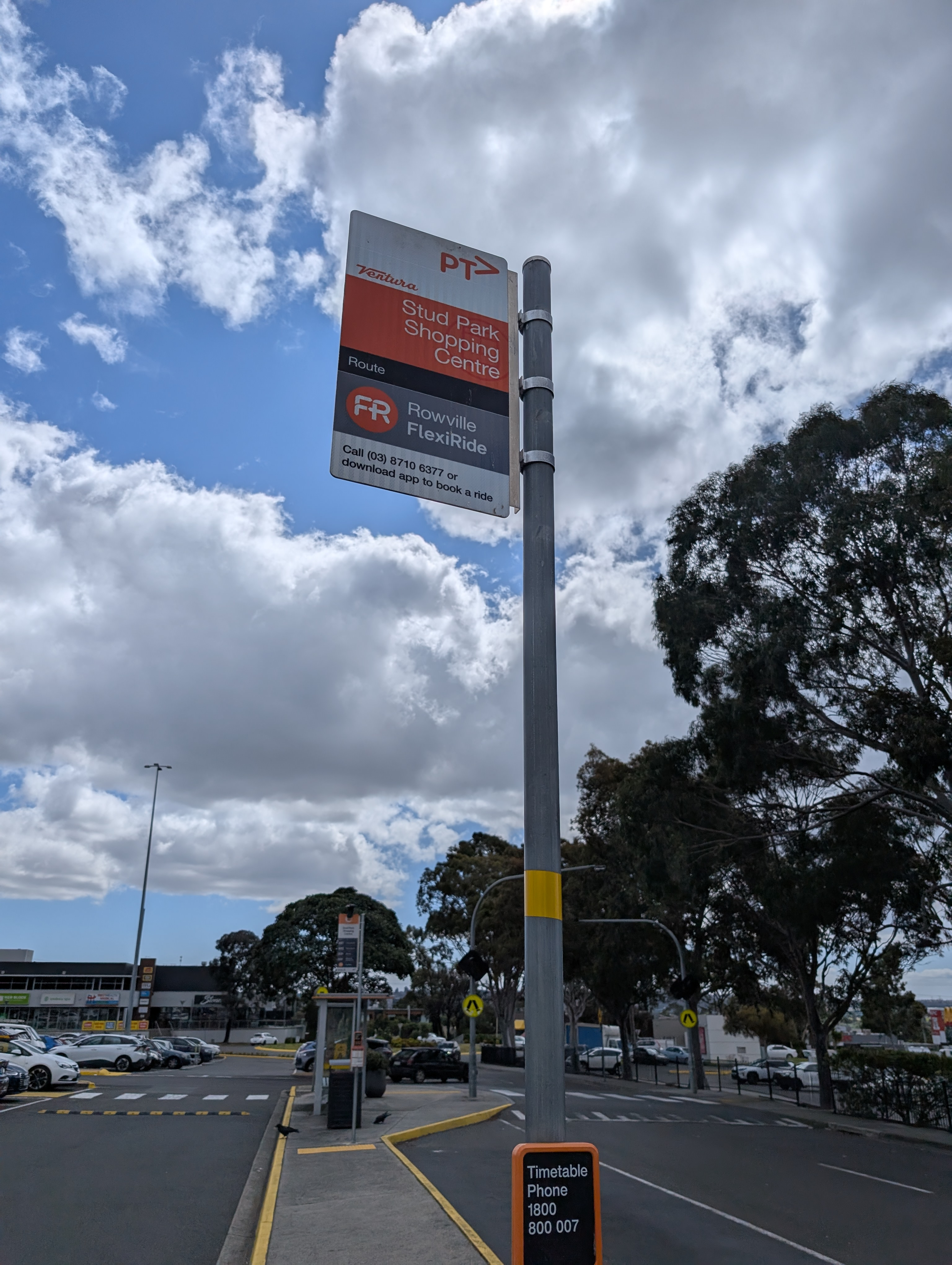
The bus interchange at the northern entrance.

The centre functions as the primary public transport interchange for Rowville, a suburb historically defined by its lack of heavy rail infrastructure.

=== Rowville Rail Link ===
Since the 1969 Melbourne Transportation Plan, Stud Park has been the designated location for a railway station on the proposed Rowville railway line. The 2012 Rowville Rail Study examined specific engineering options for terminating the line at the centre, including an "underground station box" situated beneath the main car park, or an "elevated viaduct" station.

Despite decades of political advocacy and campaign promises, the line remains unbuilt.

=== Bus services ===
In the absence of rail, the centre is served by a major bus interchange on its northern perimeter, accommodating high-frequency SmartBus routes:

- SmartBus Route 900: Caulfield railway station to Stud Park via Chadstone Shopping Centre and Monash University.
- SmartBus Route 901: Frankston railway station to Melbourne Airport via Dandenong and Broadmeadows.

== Incidents ==
The centre has historically been the subject of security incidents, partially attributed to its open-air car park design which offers multiple rapid exit points to major arterial roads like Stud Road and Fulham Road.

- 2024 Abduction and Carjacking: On 10 May 2024, a woman and her six-month-old daughter were accosted in the car park by an armed offender who forced the woman to drive to multiple electronics stores in Cranbourne and Dandenong to purchase MacBook laptops while he remained in the vehicle with the infant. The offender eventually fled on foot at a reserve in Dandenong. The incident received significant media coverage and prompted renewed calls for improved lighting and security in the centre's expansive car parks.
- Police Ramming Incident: In August 2025, the centre was the scene of a dangerous confrontation between police and car thieves. Officers located a stolen black Lexus in the car park and attempted to apprehend the occupants. The driver reversed at speed, ramming the police vehicle before fleeing the scene. The offenders were tracked and arrested shortly after in Boronia.
- Ram Raids: The centre has frequently been targeted by "ram raid" style burglaries, particularly involving ATMs and glass shopfronts. These repeated attacks led to the installation of heavy-duty safety bollards at key entrances to prevent vehicles from breaching the mall interior.

== See also ==
- List of shopping centres in Australia
- Rowville railway line
- Stamford Park
