= Kmart Australia =

Australian discount department store chain owned by Wesfarmers

Kmart Australia Limited
- Logo used since 2018

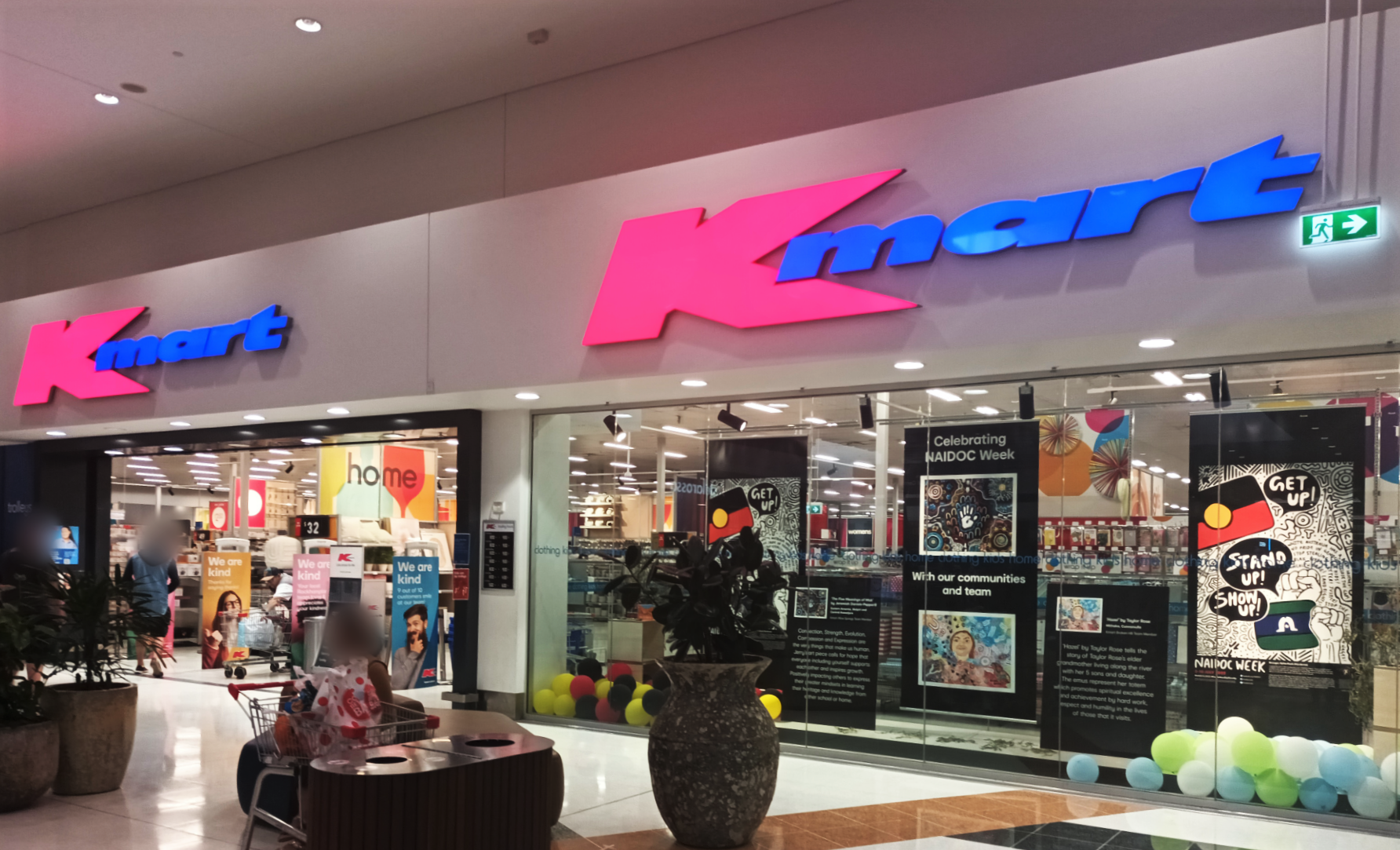
- Kmart at Stockland Rockhampton in 2022
- Type: Subsidiary
- Industry: Retail
- Founded: 1969; 57 years ago
- Headquarters: Mulgrave, Victoria, Australia
- Number of locations: 323 (Australia and New Zealand) (2026)
- Area served: Australia; New Zealand
- Key people: Aleksandra Spaseska (Managing Director, Kmart Group)
- Brands: Anko
- Revenue: ▲ A$11.429 billion (FY2025) (Note: Wesfarmers reports financial results for the Kmart Group segment (Kmart and Target combined).)
- Operating income: ▲ A$1.046 billion (FY2025)
- Number of employees: c. 38,000 (Australia, New Zealand and key sourcing markets) (2026)
- Parent: Wesfarmers
- Website: kmart.com.au kmart.co.nz

Kmart Australia Limited (/ˈkeɪmɑːrt/ KAY-mart), trading as Kmart, is an Australian chain of discount department stores owned by the Kmart Group division of Wesfarmers. Kmart operates stores in Australia and New Zealand and is part of the Kmart Group alongside Target Australia.

Kmart was established in 1969 with the opening of its first store at Burwood East, Victoria. In the 2010s, the chain undertook a major merchandising and store-layout redesign under Wesfarmers, expanding the role of private-label products (including its dominant house brand Anko) and increasing emphasis on everyday low pricing. In 2025, Kmart faced allegations that it had misled consumers about its ethical sourcing practices by sourcing products from factories in China's Xinjiang region allegedly linked to forced labour.

== History ==
Original logo, used from 1969 to 1972

Logo in use from 1992 to 2006; still used as a secondary logo

=== 1968–1977: Establishment and early expansion ===
Kmart Australia was formed as a joint venture between G.J. Coles & Coy Limited (Coles) and the S.S. Kresge Company (later Kmart Corporation). Kresge held 51% of the common stock and Coles held 49%.

Before proceeding with Kmart, G.J. Coles & Coy Limited trialled a ColMart concept store in 1968, a large variety store located in Whyalla, South Australia. This store kept trading well into the 1990s, eventually being co-branded as Fosseys Colmart. This store was eventually closed and converted to a Target store when Coles Myer discontinued Fosseys.

The first Australian store opened on 30 April 1969 at Burwood East in Melbourne, originally designated "Coles Burwood Store No. 1". The site was later redeveloped as the Burwood One shopping centre, where Kmart remains a tenant.

Early Kmart stores operated as large-format discount department stores, and some openings were combined discount department store and supermarket locations. This reflected Coles' strategy of co-locating general merchandise and grocery retailing, with early stores stocking over 40,000 items.

During this period, the company introduced Kmart Food, a supermarket format developed adjacent to, or integrated with, the discount department stores. By June 1975 there were 21 Kmart Food supermarkets in operation. The standalone grocery branding was short-lived, and the supermarkets were integrated into the broader corporate grocery strategy, rebranding as Coles New World supermarkets during the 1976 financial year.

=== 1982–1989: The Super Kmart hypermarket era ===
During the 1980s, Coles developed the Super Kmart hypermarket format, designed to combine a Kmart discount department store with a supermarket under one roof. The first location opened in Forster, New South Wales in November 1982. Following this, the company quickly opened an initial wave of four Super Kmart complexes across 1982 and 1983 to anchor suburban shopping hubs.

The format was designed to pool the operational logistics and buying power of the established Kmart network with Coles' grocery infrastructure, allowing shoppers to purchase general merchandise and foodstuffs through a single, centralised checkout bank. Many of these hypermarket footprints also integrated dedicated "K Auto" service bays directly adjacent to the main building, offering automotive accessories alongside mechanical servicing.

Despite reaching a peak of 34 locations, the Super Kmart concept was officially discontinued on 12 May 1989 due to the high administrative costs associated with maintaining a separate management structure, with the company opting to integrate the stores into its mainstream retail networks. Following the decision, dividing walls were installed to split the large spaces into separate Kmart and Coles New World supermarket tenancies. The final two stores originally destined to open as Super Kmart outlets—at the Stud Park Shopping Centre in Rowville, Victoria and the Logan Hyperdome in Shailer Park, Queensland—opened in July and August 1989 respectively as separate Kmart and Coles New World stores.

=== 1995–2006: Coles Myer era and further diversification ===
By the mid-1990s, Kmart continued to expand and refurbish stores within the Coles Myer group, including a high-profile opening at Chadstone in 1995. In November 1996, following the deregulation of shopping hours in Victoria, Kmart pioneered 24-hour, 7-day-a-week trading, starting with its original Burwood store.

In 1999, the company launched the Kmart Garden Supercentre, a standalone warehouse format specialising in outdoor living and plants. Six nurseries operated across the eastern states until 2007, when they were gradually divested, with several rebranded as Flower Power Garden Centre. Kmart also trialled a standalone fast-fashion store concept called Girl Xpress in the mid-2000s. The dedicated storefronts were discontinued, but the brand was retained as an exclusive in-house Kmart label. Another retail trial included the Kmart Clearance Centre at Ringwood in 2006.

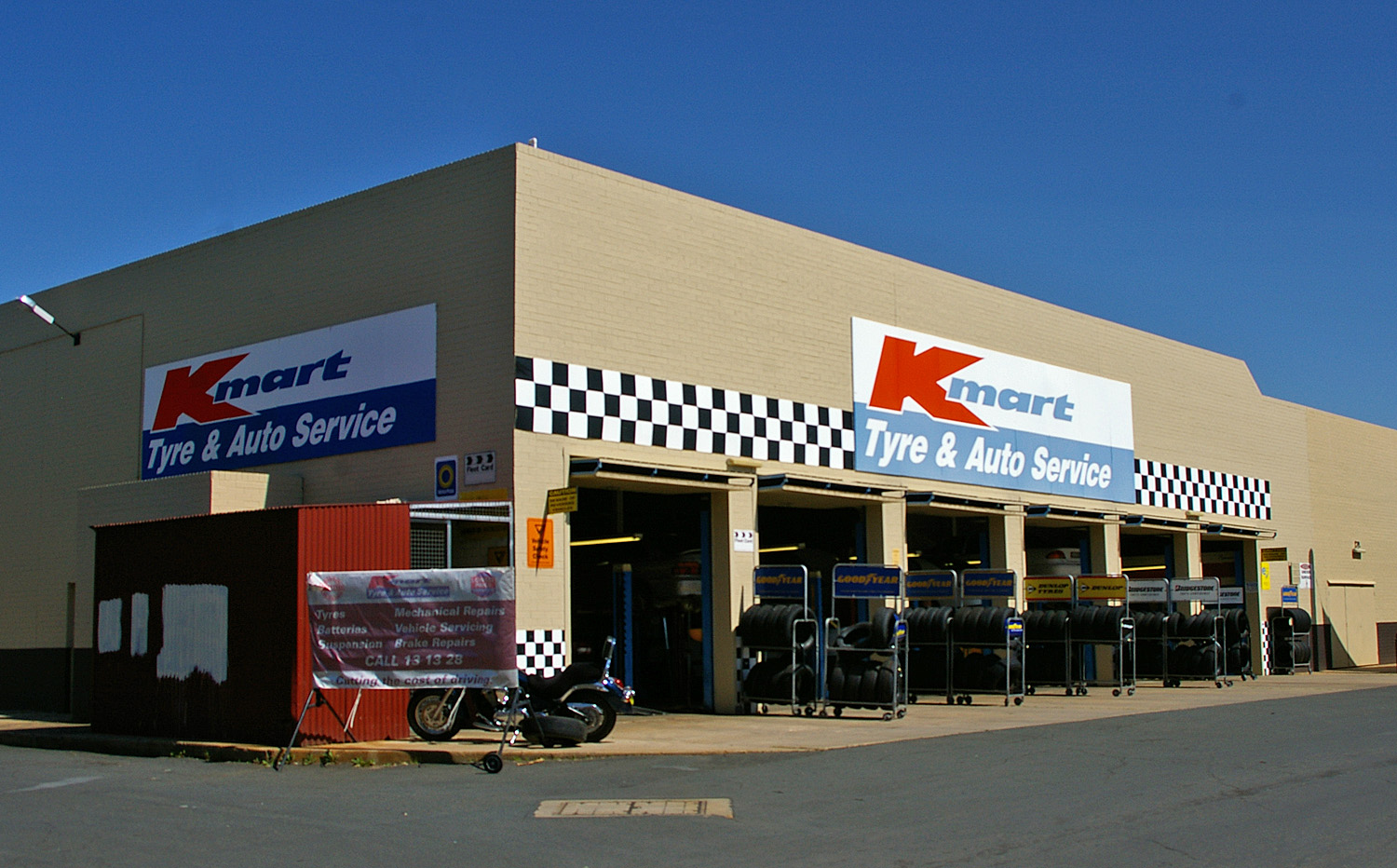
Former Kmart Tyre & Auto Service in Wagga Wagga

Kmart Tyre and Auto Service expanded significantly during this period. Operating automotive service centres often co-located with Kmart stores, the network absorbed 91 new auto stores (including former Shell Autoserv sites) in 2006, expanding the footprint to 275 locations.

In September 2006, the newly renamed Coles Group announced plans to integrate Kmart, Bi-Lo, and liquor brands into larger-format superstores. However, by March 2007, the superstore plan was deferred pending the imminent sale of the company.

=== 2007–present: Wesfarmers ownership and modernisation ===
In July 2007, Wesfarmers announced it would acquire Coles Group for A$22 billion. During the 2007 sale process, Woolworths Limited proposed acquiring Kmart and Officeworks, but the Australian Competition and Consumer Commission opposed the proposal. Following the takeover, Wesfarmers considered selling Kmart or converting stores to Target, but ultimately decided to retain and invest in the chain, committing A$300 million over five years.

Under the leadership of Guy Russo, who was appointed managing director in 2008, Kmart altered its retail strategy. The retailer shifted away from percentage sales and third-party brands, focusing instead on everyday low pricing and private-label merchandise. Kmart Photos transitioned from Kodak to an HP platform in 2009, before returning to Kodak minilabs in 2014. Store layouts were redesigned to consolidate merchandise into lifestyle groupings, with checkouts relocated to the centre of many stores.

In August 2017, Wesfarmers purchased the perpetual rights to use the Kmart brand in Australia and New Zealand for A$100 million, permanently severing licensing ties with the American Kmart corporation. In 2018, Kmart phased out DVDs, CDs, and related home entertainment hardware to reallocate floor space to homewares and children's products. Also in 2018, Wesfarmers sold Kmart Tyre and Auto Service to Continental AG for A$350 million; the centres were rebranded as MyCar in 2019.

During 2020 and 2021, Wesfarmers converted 92 Target locations to Kmart. This strategy introduced the smaller-format K Hub stores, primarily replacing Target Country locations in regional communities to offer a curated Kmart range and click-and-collect services. The integration deepened in July 2023 when Wesfarmers announced the merger of Kmart and Target's back-of-house functions under a "two brands, one business" model.

In June 2026, Kmart opened a retail warehouse that is meant to rival Harvey Norman and IKEA. In the same month, Kmart also moved store checkouts closer to the exit of the store rather than the previous layout of having checkouts in the centre of the store. Kmart's previous layout had attracted some criticism.

== Operations and brands ==
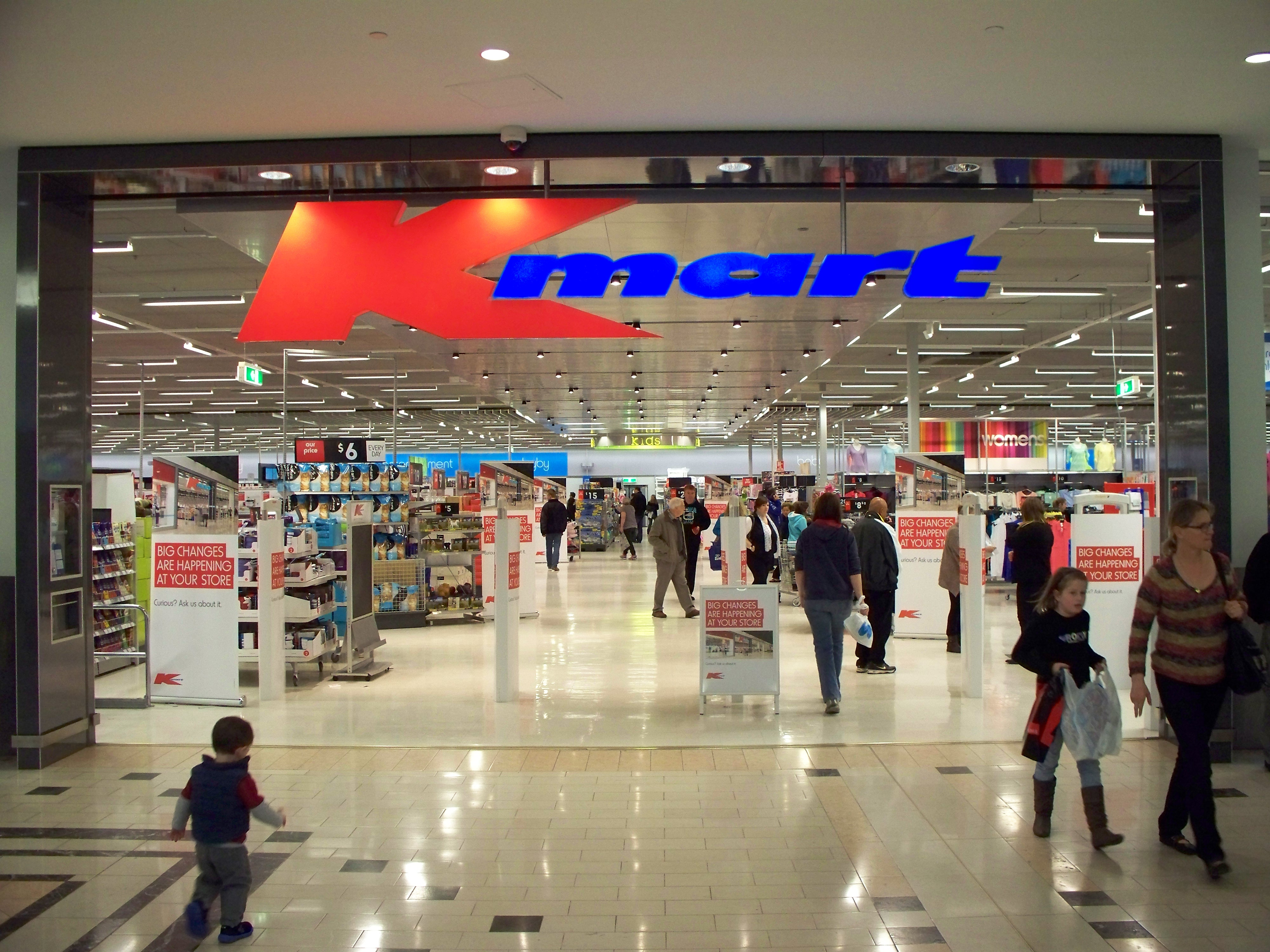
Store at Eastland Shopping Centre, Melbourne, in 2013

Kmart stores stock merchandise across broad categories including home (for example: kitchenware, bedding, storage, small appliances, lighting, hardware and seasonal products), clothing (apparel, footwear and cosmetics) and kids (toys, children's apparel and related goods). Several stores have regular trading hours of 8:00 am to midnight, with a further handful of locations in New South Wales, Victoria and Tasmania operating continuously 24 hours a day, closing only for selected public holidays or exceptional events. Kmart had originally pioneered this 24/7 trading model 30 years ago in 1996. Alongside standard Kmart stores, the brand also operates the K Hub model in regional locations. Wesfarmers reports Kmart Group's digital sales and app usage as part of its segment reporting. In FY2025, Wesfarmers reported monthly active app users of more than 1.3 million and continued investment in supply chain and omnichannel capability.

The Kmart Wishing Tree Appeal is an annual Christmas gift appeal run by Kmart and The Salvation Army since 1988. The appeal originated from a proposal by a Kmart staff member at the Noarlunga store in South Australia to use stores as gift collection points for charitable distribution. By 2022, the organisers reported the appeal had delivered 10 million gifts and raised more than A$5.6 million.

=== Anko ===
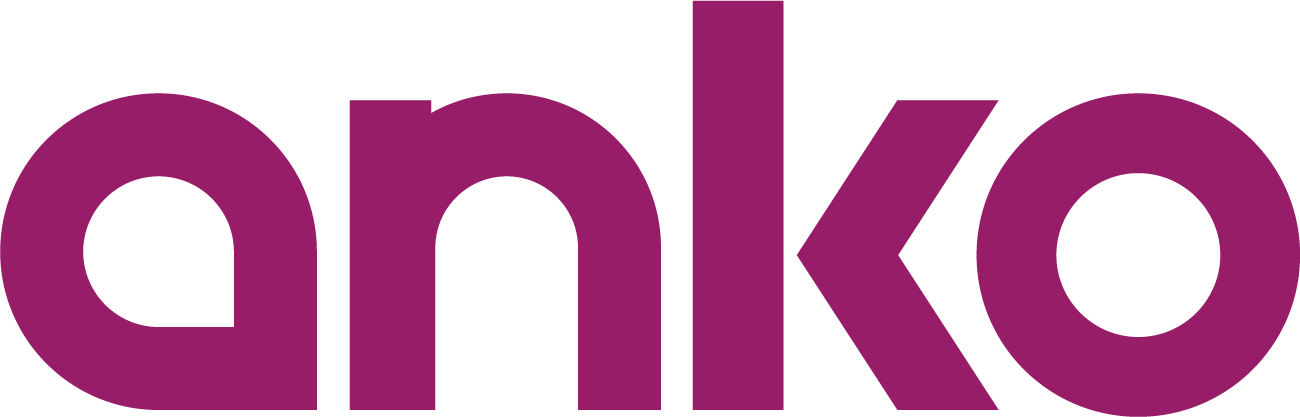
Logo used on Anko-branded products and stores.

Anko is Kmart Australia's house brand. It was introduced as an umbrella brand in 2019 (building on earlier "&Co" sub-brands) and is used across a large share of Kmart's product range. Wesfarmers reports on "Anko Global" expansion initiatives separately within Kmart Group disclosures; in FY2025, Wesfarmers reported two Anko stores had opened in the Philippines and that Anko Global revenue and earnings were immaterial to Kmart Group results. In the Philippines, Anko (as a standalone retail brand) opened its first store at Glorietta 2 (Makati) in November 2024 and a second store at Alabang Town Center in May 2025; BusinessWorld reported a third store opened at TriNoma in July 2025. Anko's loyalty program (Anko Club) is delivered via an app-based membership and has been promoted as offering access to events and activations.

Anko products have also been distributed internationally through retail partnerships, including Canada (via Zellers/Hudson's Bay) and India via online marketplaces. Media coverage of Kmart's private-label and low-price homewares has contributed to an online "Kmart hacks" subculture in Australia, where customers share DIY projects using Kmart products.

== Modern slavery allegations ==
In August 2025, the Australian Uyghur Tangritagh Women's Association commenced proceedings in the Federal Court of Australia, seeking documents relating to Kmart's supply chain after alleging that some products may have been sourced from factories in China's Xinjiang region linked to the use of forced labour involving Uyghurs. The association argued that Kmart should substantiate its public claims of ethical sourcing and sustainable business practices, alleging that the retailer may have engaged in misleading or deceptive conduct under Australian consumer law by promoting products as free from forced labour. The application was based on comparisons between Kmart's publicly available supplier list and reports identifying factories allegedly associated with forced labour in Xinjiang. Kmart denied the allegations, stating that it had maintained an Ethical Sourcing Program for more than 15 years to identify and mitigate modern slavery risks throughout its operations and supply chains. The company said suppliers participating in the program are subject to site visits, audits and investigations where concerns arise, and noted that it was the first Australian retailer to publicly disclose its factory list.

The case prompted broader debate about the effectiveness of the Australian Modern Slavery Act 2018, which has been criticised for requiring companies to report on modern slavery risks without mandating action to address them or prohibiting the importation of goods produced through forced labour. A 2023 report by the human rights organisation Walk Free estimated that Australia imports approximately A$27 billion worth of goods at risk of being produced using forced labour annually. In February 2026, the Australian Anti-Slavery Commissioner, Chris Evans, called for stronger modern slavery laws during the Federal Court proceedings, warning that Australia risked becoming a "dumping ground" for goods produced using forced labour because it lacked import bans and mandatory human rights due diligence requirements comparable to those adopted in the United States, Canada and the European Union.

Maurice Blackburn Lawyers stated that they had identified what they described as "credible links" between two Kmart suppliers and the alleged use of Uyghur forced labour in Xinjiang, arguing that this was inconsistent with Kmart's public commitments to ethical sourcing and human rights. Kmart said it was disappointed that the proceedings had continued after more than a year of discussions regarding its Ethical Sourcing Program. The Human Rights Law Centre said the case highlighted perceived weaknesses in Australia's modern slavery laws, arguing that members of the public should not have to rely on court proceedings to scrutinise companies' supply chains.

== See also ==
- Kmart, operated by Transformco
- Big W, one of Kmart's main competitors in Australia
