= Rowville railway line =

Proposed line in Melbourne, Victoria, Australia

The Rowville railway line is a proposed extension to the suburban rail network of Melbourne, Australia. The line was first proposed by the 1969 Melbourne Transportation Plan, and a variety of studies have been conducted into its feasibility and possible routes, but no construction work has been undertaken.

Major obstacles to the line's construction include the proposed connection to the existing Dandenong corridor and the lack of a protected land reservation in which to build the line. As a consequence, various alternative proposals for providing public transport to the Rowville area have also been put forward.

== Background ==
Rowville is a primarily residential suburb of Melbourne approximately 27 kilometres (17 mi) from the Central Business District. It forms part of the City of Knox local government area. The main Clayton campus of Monash University is nearby, designated as a major suburban employment cluster in the Melbourne 2030 development plan.

Stations on the Lilydale, Glen Waverley and Dandenong lines are within 6–7 km (3.7–4.3 mi) of Rowville and the university, but the area is described by local residents as a "black hole" for public transport due to a lack of coordinated or high-frequency bus services.

== History ==
=== Initial proposal ===
The 1969 Transportation Plan recommended three significant extensions to the suburban rail network: a Doncaster railway line; a connection from Frankston to Dandenong and a semi-orbital line from the Dandenong line near Huntingdale to the Belgrave line near Ferntree Gully via the Rowville area. It was planned to be built by 1985.

The Labor Party promised to build the railway during the 1982 Victorian state election campaign. The 1988 Metropolitan Transport Plan did not include a railway to Rowville, instead promising express 'Metlink' buses.

A study conducted by consultants for the government of Premier Jeff Kennett in the late 1990s to examine alternatives to the Scoresby Freeway investigated an extension of the Glen Waverley line to the Rowville area. It estimated the cost at $326 million but found patronage would be too low to justify the outlay.

The 2012 Rowville Rail Study studied the possibility of a rail link to Rowville. The first stage of the report was released in March 2012, and found that congestion on the Glen Waverley line, Belgrave line and Pakenham line would reduce if the rail link were constructed. It proposed stations at Huntingdale, Monash University, Mulgrave, Waverley Park, EastLink (possible future station) and Rowville.

In 2013, the railway line was brought up again in the PTV Network Development Plan. Including a new railway station at Monash University, this project will be expected to carry out in stage 3 of the plan. By the 2020s, the proposal was known as Monash Rail.

In October 2022, the newly-elected federal Labor government withdrew funding for the project in its budget. The cutting of funds would later be one of Liberal's election campaign points against Labor for the Aston by-election in April 2023.

In the early 2020s, a similar trackless tram proposal, the Caulfield-Rowville Trackless Rapid Transit (TRT) was jointly proposed by Monash University and Vicinity Centres and would run along Dandenong Road, Ferntree Gully Road and Blackburn Road between Caulfield and Monash University's Clayton campus via Chadstone, and then via Wellington Road to Rowville.

== See also ==
- Doncaster railway line – another line proposed by the 1969 Transportation Plan but never constructed
- Melbourne Airport rail link – another proposed but unconstructed rail extension however is expected to open by 2033
