= Metro Tunnel =

Underground rail line in Melbourne, Australia

- Map of the Metro Tunnel in blue and existing railway lines in grey.

Overview
- Other name: Melbourne Metro Rail
- Status: Operational
- Locale: Melbourne, Victoria, Australia
- Termini: South Kensington; South Yarra
- Stations: 5
- Website: Official website

Service
- Type: Suburban rail
- System: Melbourne rail network
- Services: Sunbury; Pakenham; Cranbourne; Airport (planned); Melton (planned)
- Rolling stock: High Capacity Metro Trains

History
- Work began: 2015
- Opened: 30 November 2025

Technical
- Line length: 9 km (6 mi)
- Num of tracks: 2
- Character: Underground
- Track gauge: 1,600 mm (5 ft 3 in) Victorian broad gauge
- Electrification: 1,500 V DC from overhead rail
- Operating speed: 80 km/h (50 mph)
- Signalling: Bombardier CITYFLO 650 CBTC

The Metro Tunnel (formerly known as Melbourne Metro Rail, shortened to MMR) is an underground heavy rail tunnel forming part of the metropolitan rail network in Melbourne, Victoria, Australia. The tunnel consists of twin 9-kilometre (6 mi) bores running northwest to southeast of Melbourne CBD between South Kensington and South Yarra, incorporating five new underground stations. It links the Pakenham and Cranbourne lines with the Sunbury line via an alignment beneath Swanston Street, forming a high-frequency cross-city rail corridor that bypasses Flinders Street station and the City Loop. A proposed new Airport rail line serving Melbourne Airport and a future connection to Melton are also planned to operate via the Metro Tunnel.

The Metro Tunnel project was managed by the Victorian Infrastructure Delivery Authority and was part of the Victorian Government's "Big Build" infrastructure initiative. The project was built for an estimated cost of A$12.8 billion. The project enables the operational separation of various existing lines on Melbourne's rail network and increase the capacity of the system to allow for more frequent services. The Metro Tunnel has communications-based train control and platform screen doors, both a first for Melbourne. In addition to relieving the peak-hour ridership pressure on the City Loop, the tunnel has also brought heavy rail services to the University of Melbourne, various major tertiary hospitals and health science research institutes in Parkville (collectively known as the Melbourne Biomedical Precinct), and the Royal Botanic Gardens, all of which previously relied on trams and buses for last-mile transit to and from railway stations.

The Andrews Government began planning the project in 2015. Initial construction works commenced in early 2017. Sections of the Melbourne CBD, including City Square and parts of Swanston Street, were closed to enable construction of the tunnel and stations. Tunnelling began in 2019 and was completed in 2021. Construction of the five new stations was mostly completed in October 2025. The Metro Tunnel opened to the public with an initial soft-opening branded the 'Summer Start' on 30 November 2025, with over 70,000 people visiting on opening day. Full service through the tunnel, marketed as the 'Big Switch' commenced on 1 February 2026. In celebration of the opening of the Metro Tunnel, all public transport services in Victoria were free on weekends from opening day until the commencement of the 'Big Switch' on 1 February 2026.

== Background ==
Melbourne's original development occurred at a time when railway technology began to emerge as a feasible and efficient mode of transit. This led to a symbiotic relationship between the CBD and the rail network which grew to surround it. An almost purely radial system of lines, developed largely before 1930, linked the growing suburbs to the economic hub of the city centre, producing a system which supported the daily flow of passengers into and out of the city to access employment opportunities. Despite the increasingly car-oriented developments of the mid-20th century, the suburban rail lines in Melbourne continued to discourage any decentralisation of employment, leaving the city unusually dependent on its central core when compared to cities of similar size globally.

The first underground rail line to be built in Melbourne was the City Loop, which began construction in 1971 and opened gradually between 1981 and 1985. Among its aims were to reduce pressure on Flinders Street station by distributing passengers to three additional stations in the city centre (Parliament, Melbourne Central, Flagstaff), and to improve the capacity of the network's central core by eliminating the need for trains to change direction after terminating at Flinders Street. However, it was not entirely successful in achieving these aims. The four tunnels of the Loop proved to be a capacity constraint on the ten main railway lines entering the CBD, and the peculiarities of operating four single-direction balloon loops meant that inner-city rapid transit was difficult for passengers. At the same time, the Loop consumed much of the capital available for investment in the city's rail system. As a result, the extensions to the outer suburban network which had been envisaged as a succession to the Loop itself did not eventuate. Meanwhile, patronage on the network had entered a long period of decline, which culminated in the Lonie Report of 1980 recommending the closure of several lines.

The need for an overhaul of the existing commuter rail network was first discussed in the early 2000s as unprecedented population growth began to place significant pressure on existing rail infrastructure and constraints on the inner core of the network as it approached capacity. Other problems faced by the network in the first decade of the 21st century included inefficient operations which had developed during years of low patronage, and a loss of corporate memory, caused in part by the privatisation of rail services in the late 1990s, which limited the flexibility of planners in dealing with the burgeoning passenger numbers. Consequently, a large number of services were experiencing major overcrowding in peak periods. A series of planning documents released during the early 2000s, including Melbourne 2030 (2002), Linking Melbourne (2004) and Meeting Our Transport Challenges (2006) identified that significant capacity constraints existed in the central core and on the Dandenong corridor, but did not propose any significant capital works in the city centre, instead suggesting that the issues could be resolved by relatively minor operational changes and construction of a third track to Dandenong.

Outside the state government, support grew for a more substantial augmentation of the rail network, with many such ideas based on new underground lines through the CBD. In 2005, The Age reported that it had received a number of proposals from planning experts and engineers for rail "loops and arcs" in the central city, and publicised a plan published by Monash University professor Graham Currie for a tunnel between the University of Melbourne to the north of the city and South Yarra station to the south-east. Currie's plan also envisaged extensive improvements to the Melbourne tram network, including upgrading lines along St Kilda Road and Chapel Street to light rail standards. In 2006, the state government considered a plan to construct a combined road and rail tunnel beneath the Yarra River to provide an alternative to the West Gate Bridge, but the idea was deemed unfeasible.

By 2007, the planned third track to Dandenong was effectively abandoned, with no money provided for the project in that year's state budget, and opposition growing from the Public Transport Users Association and others. Later that year, it emerged that train operator Connex and coordinating authority Metlink were among stakeholders encouraging the government to consider a proposal similar to Currie's, but extended to Footscray in the city's west. Melbourne City Council, on the other hand, proposed a tunnel conceptually similar to the Currie plan, but running from Jewell station in the north to Windsor in the south-east.

== History ==
=== Early planning ===
In 2008, transport planner Sir Rod Eddington handed down the findings of a report into Melbourne's east–west transport needs, following a commission by the Brumby Government. The Eddington Report recommended two key projects in the city centre: an East West Link road tunnel providing an alternative cross-town route to the West Gate Bridge, and a 17 km (11 mi) rail tunnel from Footscray to Caulfield via the CBD. According to Eddington, the tunnel would increase the capacity of the central rail network by removing some trains from the City Loop, allowing future extensions to the suburban lines. In December that year, the project was incorporated into the government's Victorian Transport Plan, to be built in two stages: the first from Footscray to St Kilda Road, and the second along the rest of the route.

Following the 2010 Victorian election, the newly elected Baillieu Government abandoned the Brumby transport plan, and announced that each of the projects would be individually reviewed, some by the newly created Public Transport Development Authority. Then, in its 2012 budget, the government announced a revised version of the tunnel plan: a "Melbourne Metro" from South Kensington to South Yarra along a similar city centre route to Eddington's original proposal. The revised project included five underground stations, and was submitted to Infrastructure Australia where it was deemed "ready to proceed" and was listed as the highest-priority infrastructure project in Melbourne. A business case was quickly developed based on the constraints of the existing rail system, which was rapidly approaching its maximum capacity. The Department of Transport commenced geotechnical drillings and route investigations.

A dispute between the federal and state government over the funding for the tunnel intensified in 2013, with the approach of that year's federal election. The state budget in early May revealed that none of the $50 million in planning money allocated the previous year had been spent, with new premier Denis Napthine deferring the project in favour of the East West Link. Despite this, with the release of the 2013 federal budget a week later, the Gillard government committed $3 billion to the project on the condition that the state match the contribution. The remaining money was to be raised by a public–private partnership, with the possibility that the contractor could take over running of the line in addition to its construction. However, federal opposition leader Tony Abbott declared that if he was elected in the 2013 federal election, no Commonwealth money would be spent on urban passenger rail, and that any commitment to the Melbourne Metro tunnel project would be revoked.

Meanwhile, Public Transport Victoria's Network Development Plan – Metropolitan Rail (NDPMR), released in early 2013, identified the Metro Tunnel as the centrepiece of a 20-year strategy for improving the Melbourne suburban rail network. Public Transport Victoria argued that any expansion of the system was "impossible" without vastly improved capacity in the core of the network. The NDPMR envisaged the tunnel's construction taking place from 2017 to 2022, enabling the segregation of the rail system into four independently operated lines, each with their own routes through the CBD. It also outlined a service plan for the tunnel, proposing an initial peak hour flow of 8 trains per hour in each direction.

=== Alternative route ===
In February the following year, the state government announced that it was considering alternative alignments for the tunnel, because of concerns that cut and cover construction in Swanston Street would result in a massive disruption to traffic and retail activity for an extended period of time. At the launch of its 2014 budget, the Napthine government announced that the Metro Tunnel project would be abandoned and replaced with an alternative proposal called the Melbourne Rail Link. The MRL route consisted of a tunnel from South Yarra to Southern Cross via Kings Domain and Fishermans Bend, where it would join existing City Loop tunnels reconfigured for bidirectional traffic. Furthermore, the government promised that the realignment would enable a Melbourne Airport rail link to be constructed from Southern Cross at the same time. Ultimately, the reconfiguration of the rail network was to have produced similar operational outcomes as the Melbourne Metro plan, with a Sunbury-Dandenong corridor operating directly between Southern Cross and Flinders Street in both directions, but with an additional end-to-end line from Frankston to Ringwood via the new tracks.

According to government ministers, the Melbourne Rail Link offered greater capacity increases and less disruption during the construction phase than existing plans. However, it was heavily criticised, including by Lord Mayor of Melbourne Robert Doyle, who described the route change as a potential "100-year catastrophe" because of its failure to service the Parkville medical and research precinct. Furthermore, the government revealed in the days following the budget that it had not produced a business case for its plan, and that the decision had been taken primarily on the basis of a "common sense" need to service its urban redevelopment project at Fishermans Bend. Other concerns emerged in the months following the budget, with experts publicly questioning whether the Napthine government had committed sufficient funding, and whether the proposed tunnels could be engineered to successfully avoid the main Melbourne sewer.

=== Andrews government proposal ===
By November, as the 2014 Victorian state election approached, the rail tunnel had become a major point of contention in the campaign, with the government prioritising the East West Link (EWL) road tunnel instead. Labor opposition leader Daniel Andrews promised that "under no circumstances" would a Labor government build the EWL if elected. As an alternative, Labor proposed reinstating the original Metro Tunnel plan, which retained the support of senior public servants in the Department of Transport, Planning and Local Infrastructure. Departmental analysis indicated that the original Metro Tunnel route performed substantially better than the EWL in a cost-benefit analysis, although no such calculation had been performed for the proposed Melbourne Rail Link route.

On the eve of the election, it emerged that the Abbott federal government had redirected $3 billion in funding to the EWL, and that they would refuse to allow it to be used for the Melbourne Metro project. A Labor state government under Premier Daniel Andrews was elected the following day, and immediately set about cancelling contracts for the EWL. At the same time however, new Treasurer Tim Pallas conceded that it would be "difficult" to deliver the Metro Tunnel given the complexities of the funding dispute.

In February 2015, the Andrews government announced $40 million in immediate funding to establish the Melbourne Metro Rail Authority, in order to commence detailed planning work along the original route, and promised a further $300 million in its upcoming budget. It also revealed that a $3 billion line of credit originally established to fund the EWL would be redirected to the Melbourne Metro project. A timeline was provided, with construction expected to commence in 2018 and the tunnel to be open in 2026. Meanwhile, the federal government continued to refuse to fund the project, which led some observers to describe Andrews' commitment as a "significant political risk".

Proposed extensions to Melbourne's railway network

=== Funding ===
On 15 April 2015, the government announced that the MMRA had selected a route along Swanston Street as the preferred alignment for the project. The announcement revealed that routes under Elizabeth Street and Russell Street had been considered but were rejected on the basis of engineering difficulties and lack of connectivity respectively. For similar reasons, the route selected along Swanston Street was a shallow tunnel above the City Loop and CityLink tunnels, at a depth of 10 m (33 ft), and was therefore to be constructed using cut-and-cover methods. The announcement was criticised by representatives of city retailers, who claimed that the disruption would cause damage to their businesses. The government acknowledged massive changes to city access but assured retailers they would be treated fairly. Further concerns about the proposed route emerged when it emerged that the tunnel would not connect to South Yarra station and that the Pakenham and Cranbourne services would bypass the station entirely once the tunnel opened.

Discussions about the funding of the project continued into late April. The state government acknowledged that the Abbott federal government would not make any contribution to the project, but stated that it remained "hopeful" a future federal government would change the policy. Towards the end of the month, the Andrews government announced that $1.5 billion would be allocated in the upcoming state Budget for the full cost of pre-construction works, land and property acquisition, and detailed route investigations, on top of the already announced money for planning. Among the work funded was the drilling of 140 bore holes to establish ground conditions along the route. However, questions remained about the state government's capacity to fund the remainder of the project, and it was reported that no business case had been completed, despite this being Labor's key objection to the Melbourne Rail Link plan when in opposition. A levy on land tax for commercial properties benefiting from the tunnel, similar to that used on the City Loop and on the contemporary London Crossrail project, was proposed as one possible solution. At the same time the funding announcement was made, the MMRA announced it had appointed technical and planning advisors for the project.

=== Detailed planning ===
After the state Budget in May, details gradually emerged of the revised business case for the tunnel, including specific routes and tunnel options. The government ruled out an interchange to the existing railway station at South Yarra because of its expense, a move criticised by opposition parties and public transport advocates. Investigative drilling along Swanston Street began in early June, with the government announcing later in June that negotiations with the financiers of the cancelled EWL had concluded, enabling the $3 billion credit facility to be redirected to the Metro Tunnel. In August, tunnel boring machines were announced as the preferred engineering option for the sections of the project under the Yarra River. The September federal Liberal leadership spill, which saw Malcolm Turnbull replace Abbott as prime minister, led to new hope for federal funding of the project when Turnbull announced he would consider all transport projects on their merits through Infrastructure Australia.

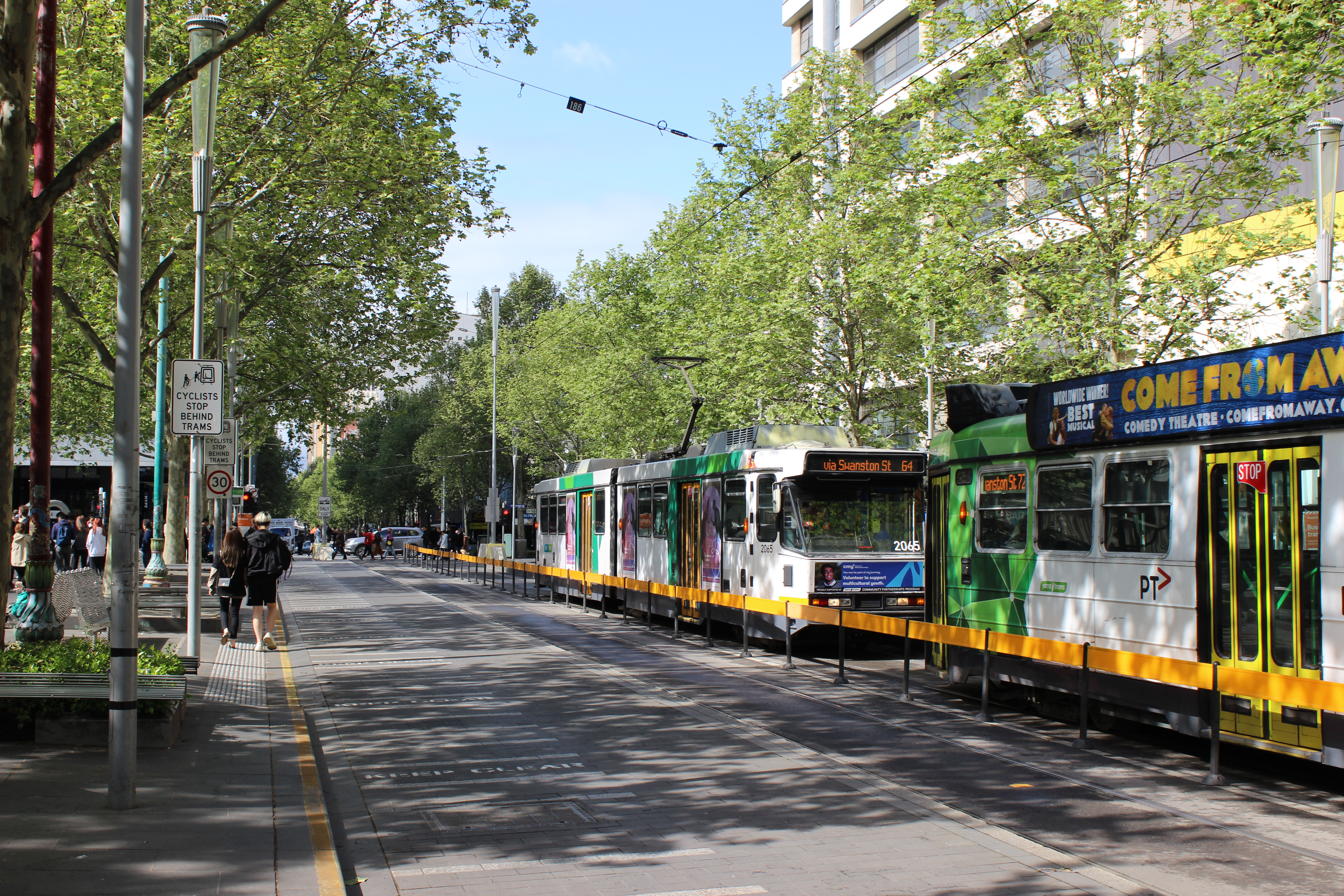
A plan for a cut-and-cover tunnel was replaced with a deeper mined tunnel in order to avoid disruptions to Swanston Street, Melbourne's main civic spine and busiest tram corridor.

In October 2015, the government announced it had abandoned earlier plans to run the tunnel 10 metres beneath Swanston Street and above the existing City Loop tunnels and instead place parts of the project 40 metres (131 ft) underground between CBD North and CBD South stations. The decision was made to reduce the disruption to trams services and traders along Swanston Street and to avoid removing critical utilities, such as telecommunication lines, from beneath the street. The cost of the change was disputed, with the government claiming the additional tunnelling expense would be met by the savings of services remaining in place, but opposition parties arguing the change could be up to $1 billion more expensive.

With the key engineering details in place, the scope of the project and its associated disruptions gradually became public. The government first announced in October it would compulsorily acquire the properties of 63 households and 31 businesses at several locations on the tunnel route. Later, in November, road closures for up to five years were announced near construction sites, and specific station designs were released for the first time. The first package of works, a $300 million contract for site preparation and services relocation, was opened for tenders by MMRA on 25 November.

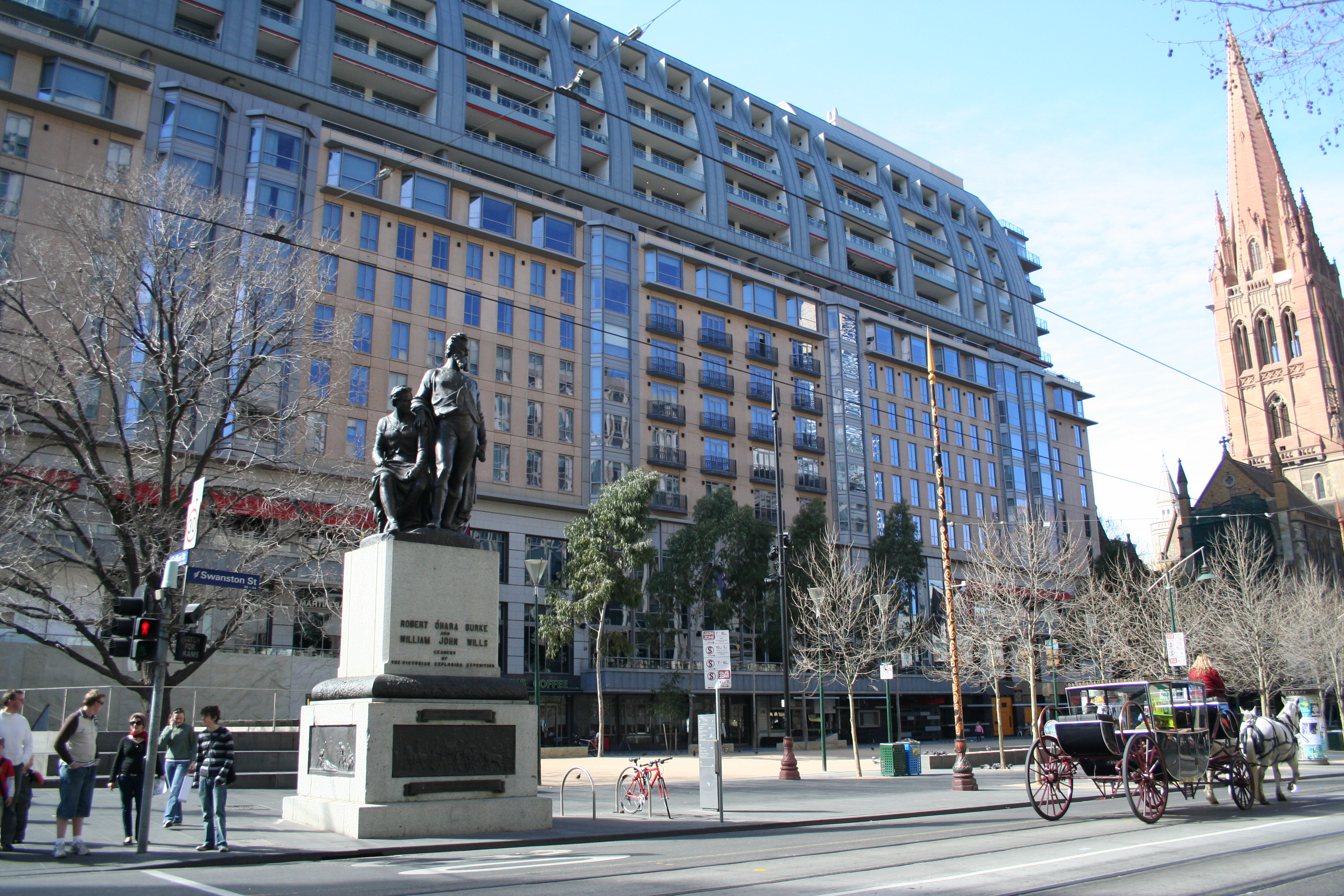
Melbourne's City Square, which has been demolished for construction of Town Hall station

In February 2016, the full business case for the project was released which detailed its design. Early that year, geotechnical drilling was extended to the Yarra River, as political arguments continued over the Metro Tunnel's funding arrangements. Having selected a public-private partnership model based on long-term maintenance and commercial opportunities for investment, and with a new business case released publicly, the state government continued to request a significant federal contribution, but the Turnbull government said it would not consider the project until it had been independently analysed by Infrastructure Australia. Despite the ongoing dispute, a shortlist of bidders was announced in late February for the early works package, and the construction timeline continued to suggest a 2016 start to works.

In the 2016 state budget, Premier Daniel Andrews and his Treasurer Tim Pallas declared that the state would bear the entire cost of the project in lieu of federal funds, using a combination of increased revenues from a strong property market, and an increase to the states net debt over the following decade. The federal budget released in 2016 did however include $857 million redirected from other infrastructure projects to the tunnel, however, the funds did not represent additional support to Victoria but rather a reallocation of existing contributions.

=== Contracting ===
In June 2016, the John Holland Group was awarded a $324 million contract which includes the excavation of 35 metres (115 ft) deep open shafts adjacent to Swanston Street to enable the underground construction of the two new city stations, and the relocation of up to 100 subterranean utilities. Utility relocations started in July 2016.

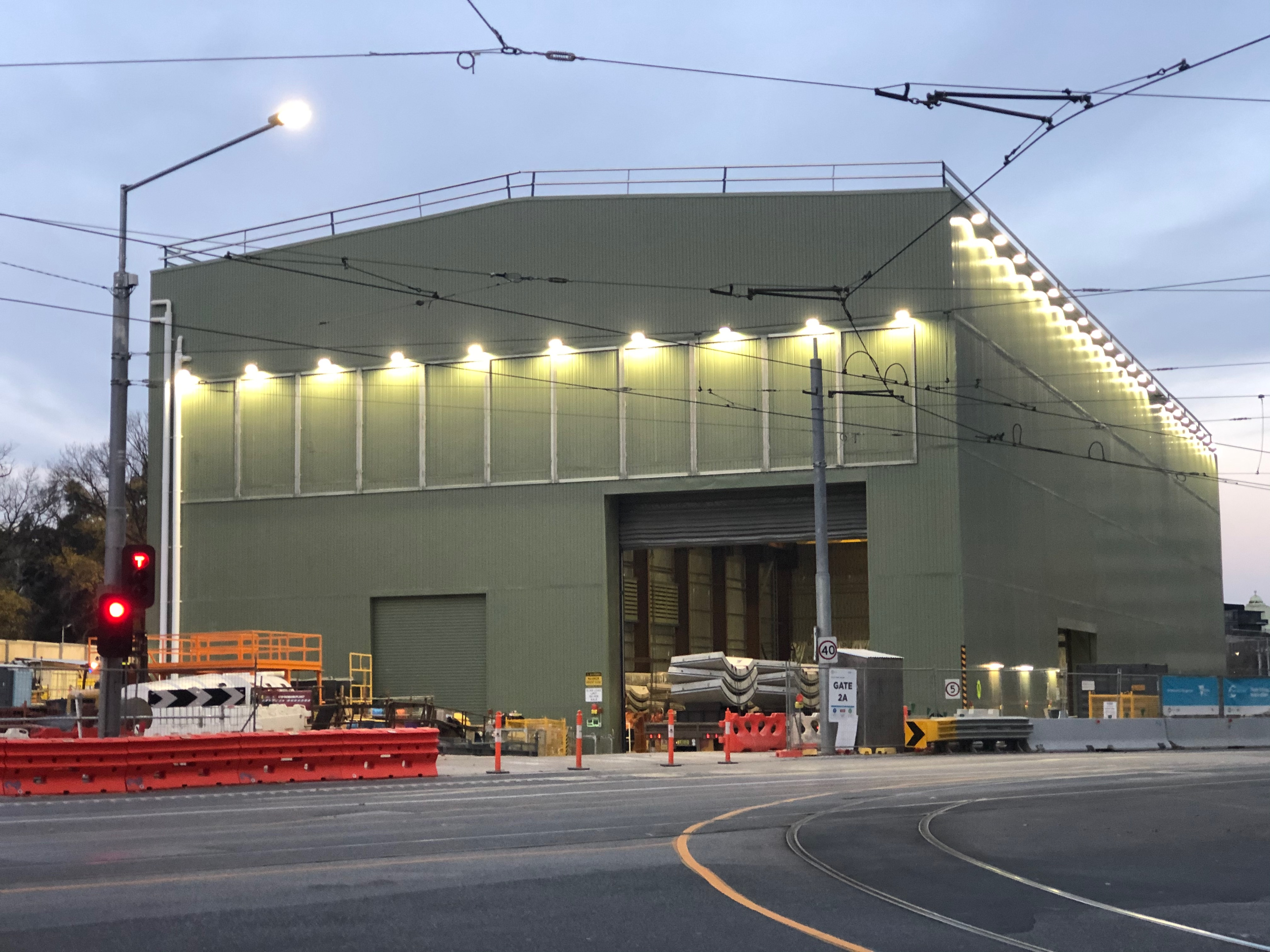
Acoustic shed at Anzac station in the domain precinct. Acoustic sheds were installed at Metro Tunnel station precincts to reduce noise and dust.

A shortlist of preferred bidders for the project's main contract, the "tunnel and stations" public-private partnership, was released in August, along with further details of the MMRA's recommended engineering solutions. The bidders were three consortia composed of engineering, construction and finance companies: Continuum Victoria, consisting Acciona Infrastructure, Ferrovial Agroman, Honeywell, Downer Rail, and Plenary Group; Moving Melbourne Together, made up of Pacific Partnerships, CPB Contractors, Ghella, Salini Impregilo, Serco, and Macquarie Capital; and Cross Yarra Partnership, including Lendlease, John Holland, Bouygues, and Capella Capital. At the same time, the MMRA exercised its powers of compulsory acquisition to acquire City Square from the City of Melbourne, ahead of the original schedule.

Over the following months, further details of the construction process were made public, including long-term road closures and the precise location of construction sites. The revelations included the MMRA's concerns about the impact of tunneling on the structural integrity of CBD buildings, including Federation Square and St Paul's Cathedral.

In December 2017, the Victorian Government selected the Cross Yarra Partnership to deliver the "tunnel and stations" public-private partnership.

== Construction ==
=== Early works ===
On 15 January 2017, works officially began on the project, with the partial closure of A'Beckett and Franklin streets in the CBD. The news was followed by Infrastructure Australia releasing a positive assessment of the project's business case and urging the federal government to contribute funding to the tunnel.

Meanwhile, a case was lodged in the Supreme Court of Victoria by protest groups in an attempt to force the government and MMRA to reroute the project around the St Kilda Road precinct. Objections to the tunnel's construction were strengthened in February, when the federal government implemented an emergency heritage protection order for the precinct, preventing the MMRA from removing around 100 trees. The Victorian government decried the move as a political stunt, and insisted that the project would go ahead as planned. At the same time, the Liberal state opposition attempted to grant the City of Stonnington planning powers over the project with a motion in state parliament, in order to force the inclusion of a South Yarra station connection, but eventually withdrew when sufficient support could not be secured in the Legislative Council.

A major milestone was reached in mid-April when City Square was fenced off for the commencement of construction and staging works. A few days later, the government announced that bids for the major construction contract had been received from each of the consortia selected on the previous year's shortlist.

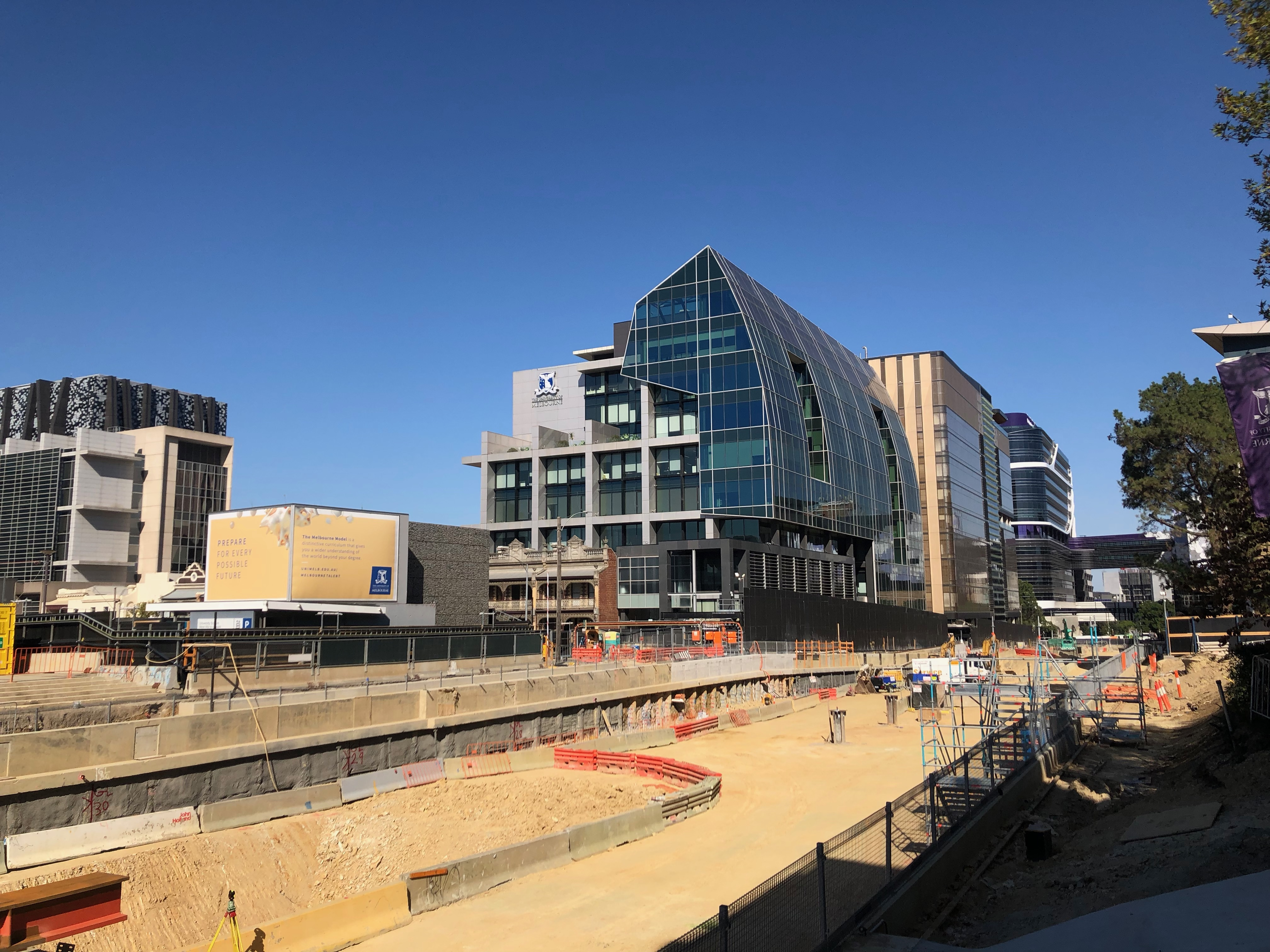
Parkville Station construction progress at the University of Melbourne in February 2018, showing the excavation of Grattan St for the station box

Cross Yarra Partnership, led by Lendlease, was named as the "preferred bidder" for the construction contract in July. The station designs presented by the consortium were released publicly, as well as details of connections to existing stations and streetscapes. Shortly afterwards, Bombardier was announced as the successful tenderer for the signalling and communication systems contract, and supplied plans to build signal control centres in Sunshine and Dandenong. The contract, including a rollout of high-capacity signalling (HCS) between Watergardens and Dandenong, was the first awarded in Australia for HCS implementation on existing rail lines.

At the end of August, the state government launched a public naming competition for the tunnel's five new stations, to replace the working names used since the project's genesis. The competition provoked a wide public response, with arguments over whether the names should reflect geographic location, cultural heritage, or tongue-in-cheek references such as Station McStationface. By the time the competition closed at the end of October, more than 50,000 submissions had been made, and the project had gained international attention with author George R. R. Martin commenting on suggestions that the stations be named after locations from his Game of Thrones series of books. However, the government emphasised that the competition was not to be judged by popular demand but by a panel of experts.

The selected names for the stations – North Melbourne, Parkville, State Library, Town Hall and Anzac – were announced in November of that year, with the government deciding on "common sense" options based on geographic location and ease of pronunciation. The existing North Melbourne station was to be renamed West Melbourne, but in early 2020 the government announced the existing station would not be renamed and the new station would revert to Arden, due to the potential for confusion and the need to relabel thousands of signalling assets.

=== Major construction ===
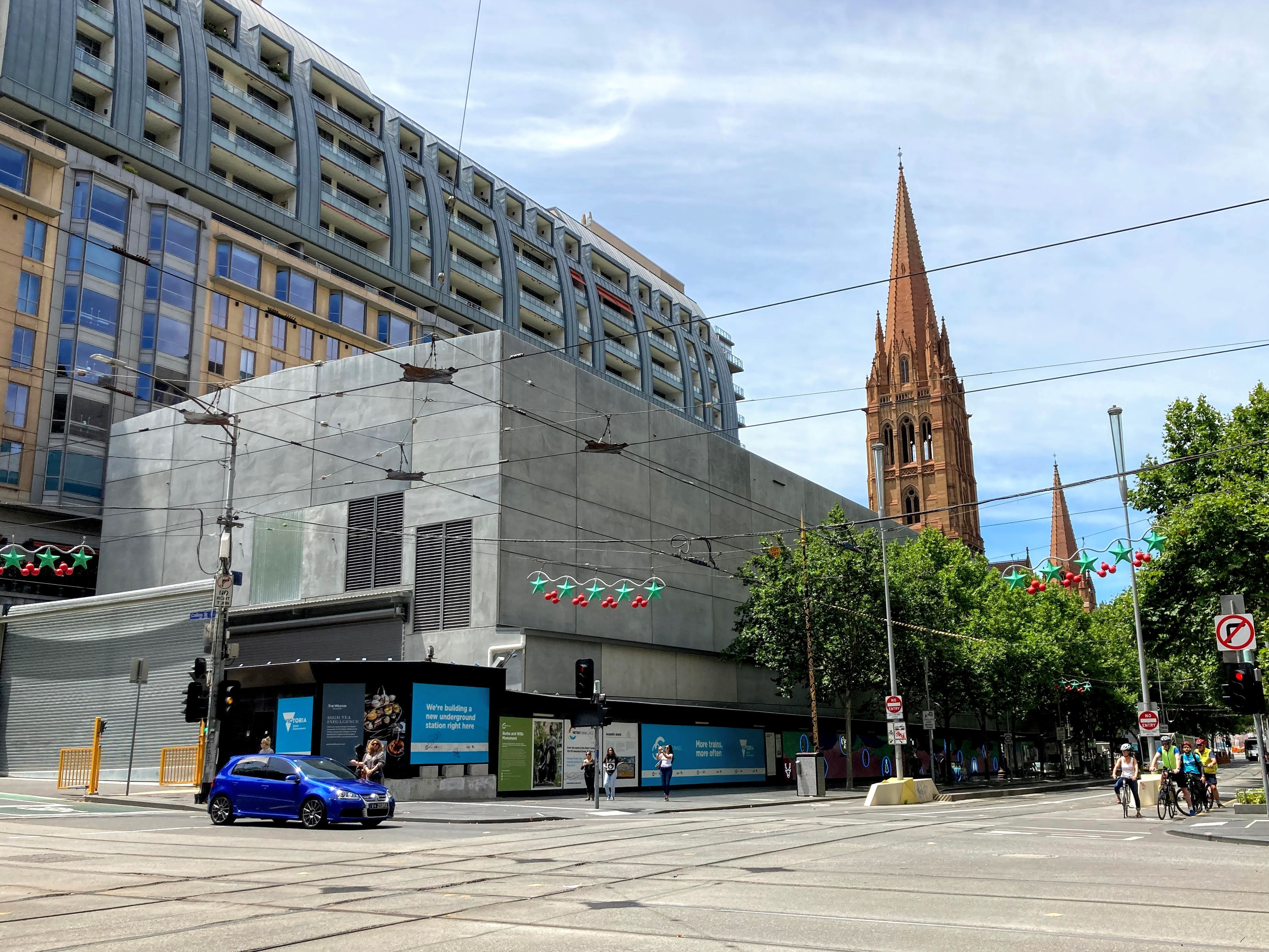
Town Hall station under construction in 2020, showing the temporary acoustic shed.

The public profile of tunnel works increased through the end of 2017, with Lord Mayor Robert Doyle complaining that the City of Melbourne's pest controllers were being overwhelmed by rats disturbed by underground works. A public viewing platform was established at the City Square building site for the public to view the construction works. On 18 December, the state government announced that it had finalised its contract with Cross Yarra Partnership, with a value of some $6 billion. Opposition leader Matthew Guy immediately signalled his intention to bring the dispute over the tunnel's design to the 2018 state election, writing to CYP to indicate that he would seek to include a station at South Yarra should his party win government the following year.

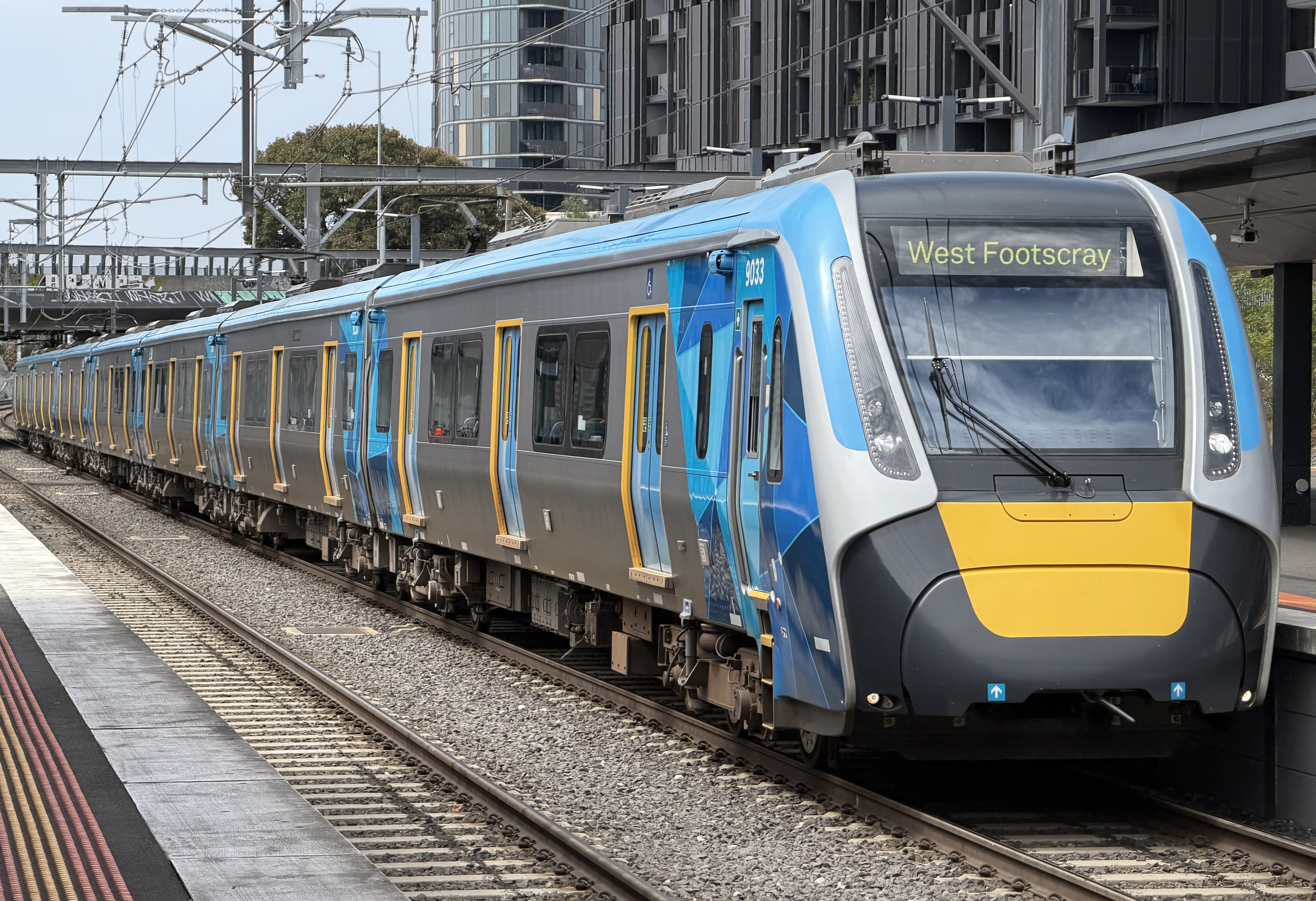
As part of the project, the first of 70 High Capacity Metro Trains entered service in 2020.

Despite ongoing legal battles, tree felling in the St Kilda Road precinct began in February 2018, marking the commencement of significant construction in the area and the consortium's commitment to its design solution for the tunnel. Then, on 20 February, the state government released the tunnel contracts, and announced that the original completion date of 2026 had been brought forward to a new target of 2025. The announcement also included a response to the Opposition's intention to renegotiate the design, with Premier Daniel Andrews claiming it would mean a two-year delay to the overall project.

In April, further concerns about the tunnel's impact on buildings near its route emerged, with managers of the Victorian Comprehensive Cancer Centre in Parkville and the Manchester Unity Building in the CBD, along with the University of Melbourne, making submissions to the MMRA suggesting their properties were at serious risk of damage from construction and operation vibration. The authority responded that it would work with stakeholders to minimise impacts and ensure the project did not produce any adverse impacts. In the same month, the state government announced an upgrade of South Yarra station separate from the Metro Tunnel, in order to address the concerns about its lack of connectivity to the project.

Following a series of announcements of major rail projects prior to the state budget in May, the Melbourne Metro Rail Authority was renamed to Rail Projects Victoria (RPV) to reflect its involvement in projects outside the Metro Tunnel.

Final designs and concept images for the new stations were released in May 2018, using materials and features intended to reflect the character of the five station precincts. CYP, RPV and Minister for Public Transport Jacinta Allan expressed their hope that the designs would be accepted and integrated into the Melbourne landscape as new cultural icons following their completion. In June, the state government released modelling demonstrating the project's contribution to improved accessibility in the CBD, with travel time savings from virtually all parts of Greater Melbourne to the Parkville and St Kilda Road areas served by the Metro Tunnel.

==== Tunnelling ====
Finished tunnel as of March 2022 near the future Arden station, prior to the installation of rail.

In April, June, and July 2019, multiple rail lines in Melbourne's east were shut down for several weeks to allow construction of the tunnel entrances near Kensington and South Yarra. The first tunnel boring machine began to be assembled in North Melbourne in June 2019.

In February 2020, TBM Joan completed the first section of the tunnel from Arden to Kensington, travelling 1.2 kilometres (0.75 mi) and installing 4,200 curved concrete segments to create 700 rings lining the walls of the tunnel. Two months later, TBM Meg completed the accompanying tunnel, from Arden to Kensington. The third TBM, TBM Millie, began tunnelling to the South Yarra eastern tunnel entrance on 27 April 2020. As part of this process, it was lowered underground and assembled along with its counterpart TBM Alice. It tunnelled 1.7 kilometres (1.06 mi) to its destination. TBM Alice was released a month later, on 25 May 2020. TBM Joan began tunnelling again, this time towards Parkville, from Arden, on 25 May 2020. The release of TBM Meg towards Parkville meant that for the first time in the project, all four TBMs were tunnelling at the same time.

In May 2020, major traffic changes were put in place near Flinders Street Station in order to improve safety around large trucks entering acoustic sheds as a part of the project. Left turns from St Kilda Road to Flinders Street were removed, and the pedestrian crossing between St Paul's Cathedral and Federation Square was temporarily closed.

Digging for the twin 9 kilometres (5.6 mi) tunnels completed in May 2021. Between all four TBMs, this averaged to a rate of 90 m (295 ft) per week. Road-headers constructed 26 cross-passages along the tunnel in 2021. In mid-2022 crews began laying track in the tunnels. This was completed in 2023, with the successful installation of 4000 pre-cast concrete tracks panels, including sections of floating slab track, padded underneath to reduce noise and vibrations as trains pass through.

Metro tunnel construction photos 2018–2022
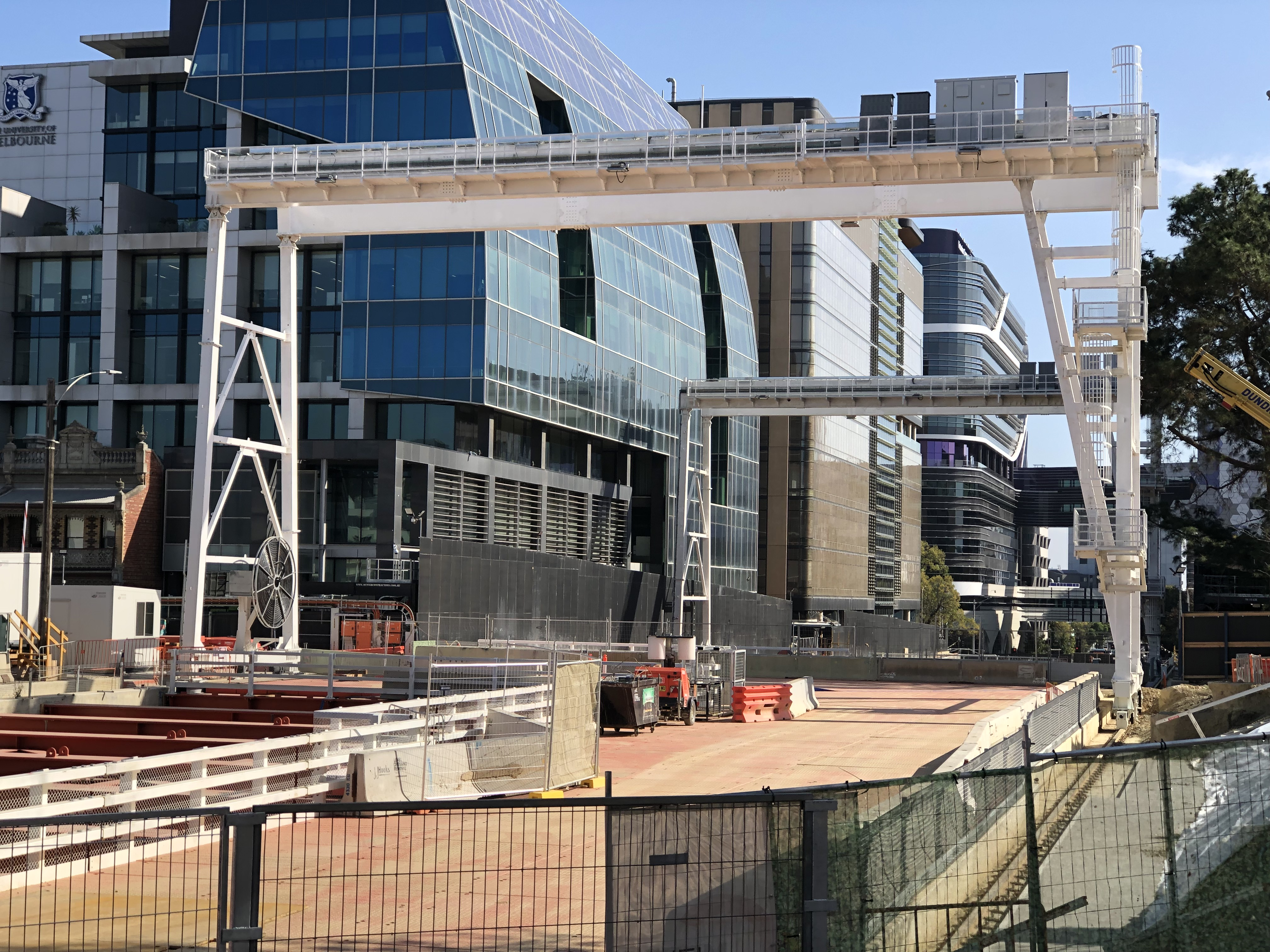
Parkville station construction site with installed station roof and gantry cranes, 2019

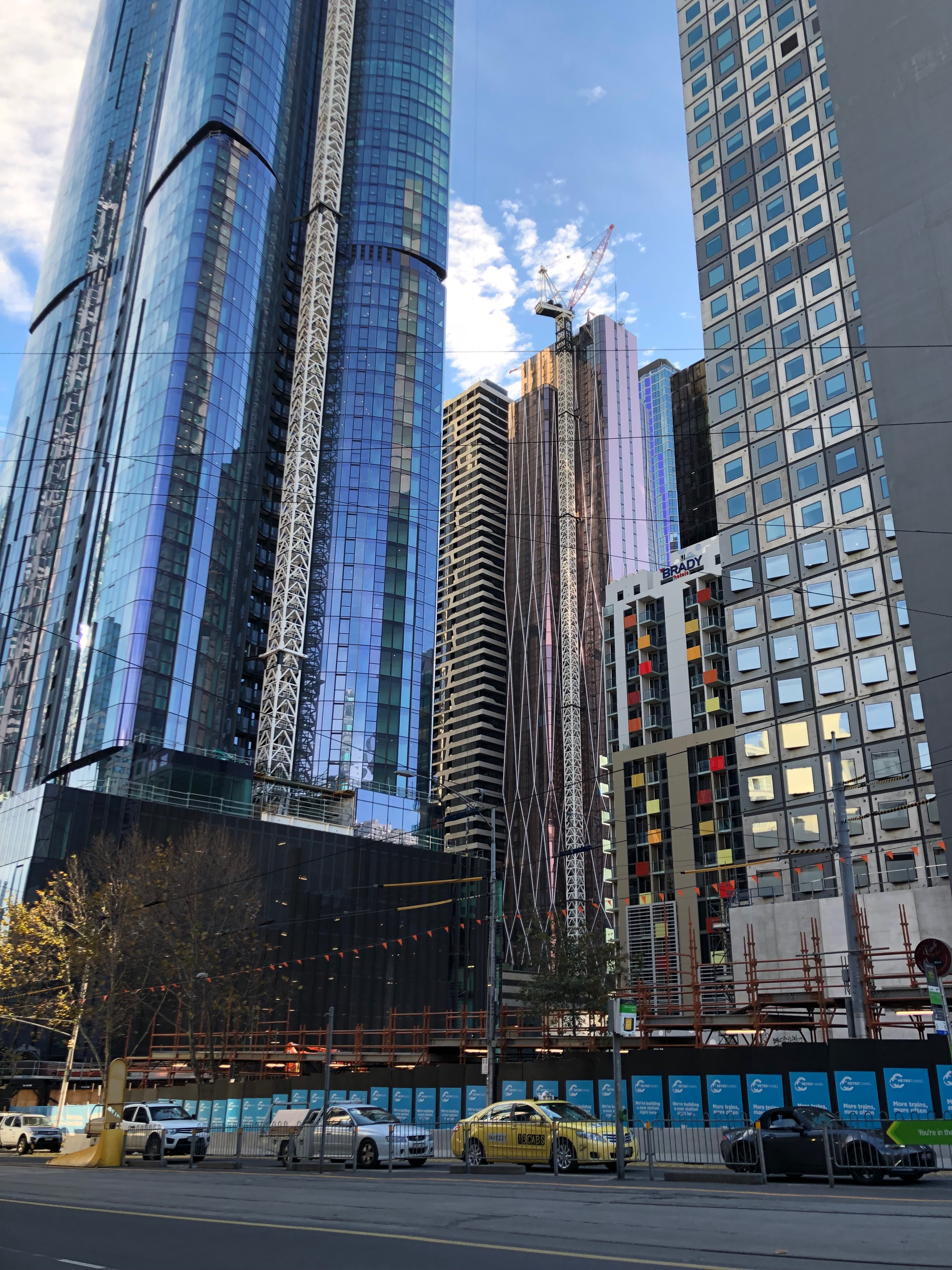
State Library station construction site, 2018

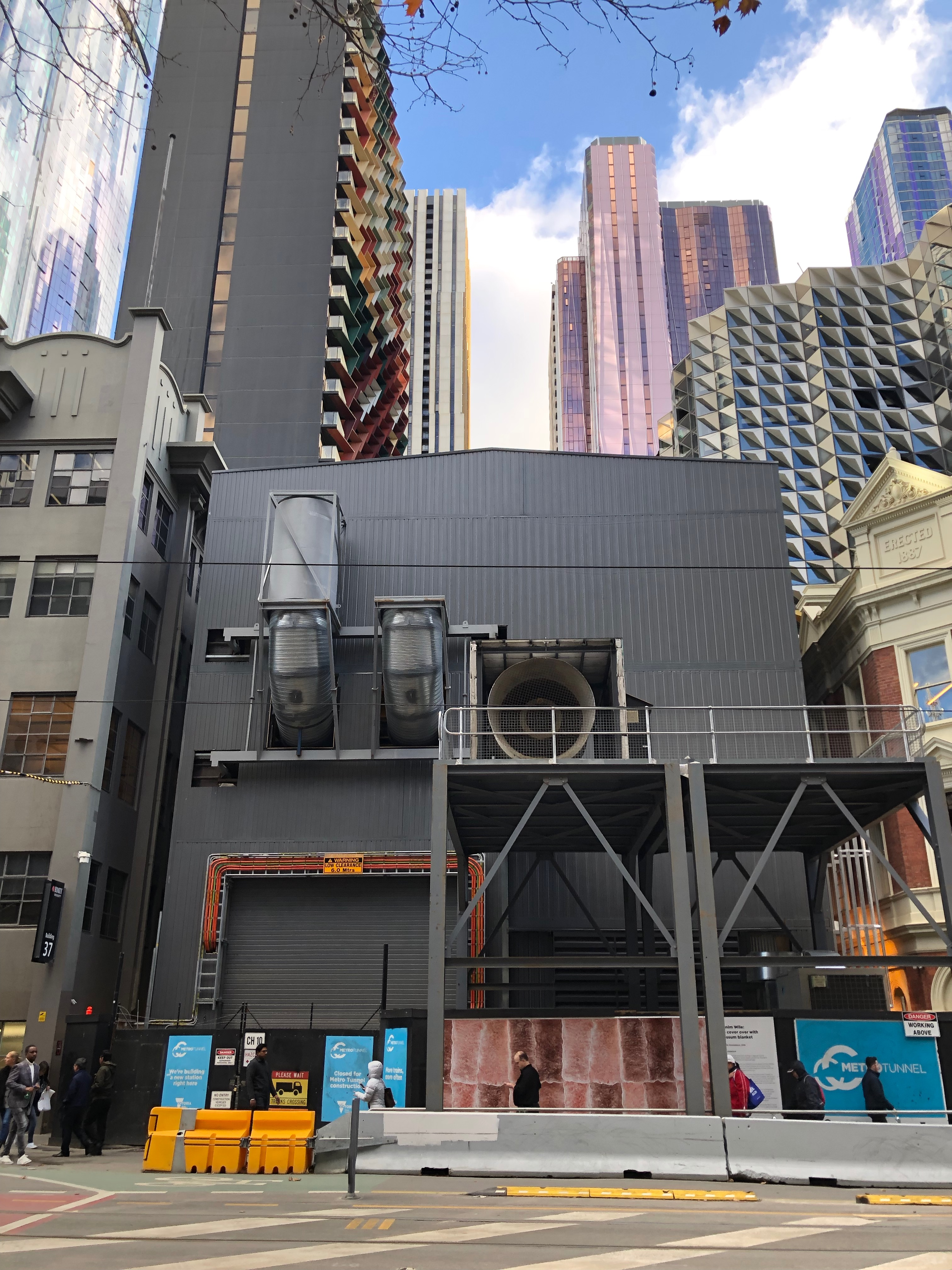
State Library station construction site on A'Beckett St with newly constructed acoustic shed, 2019

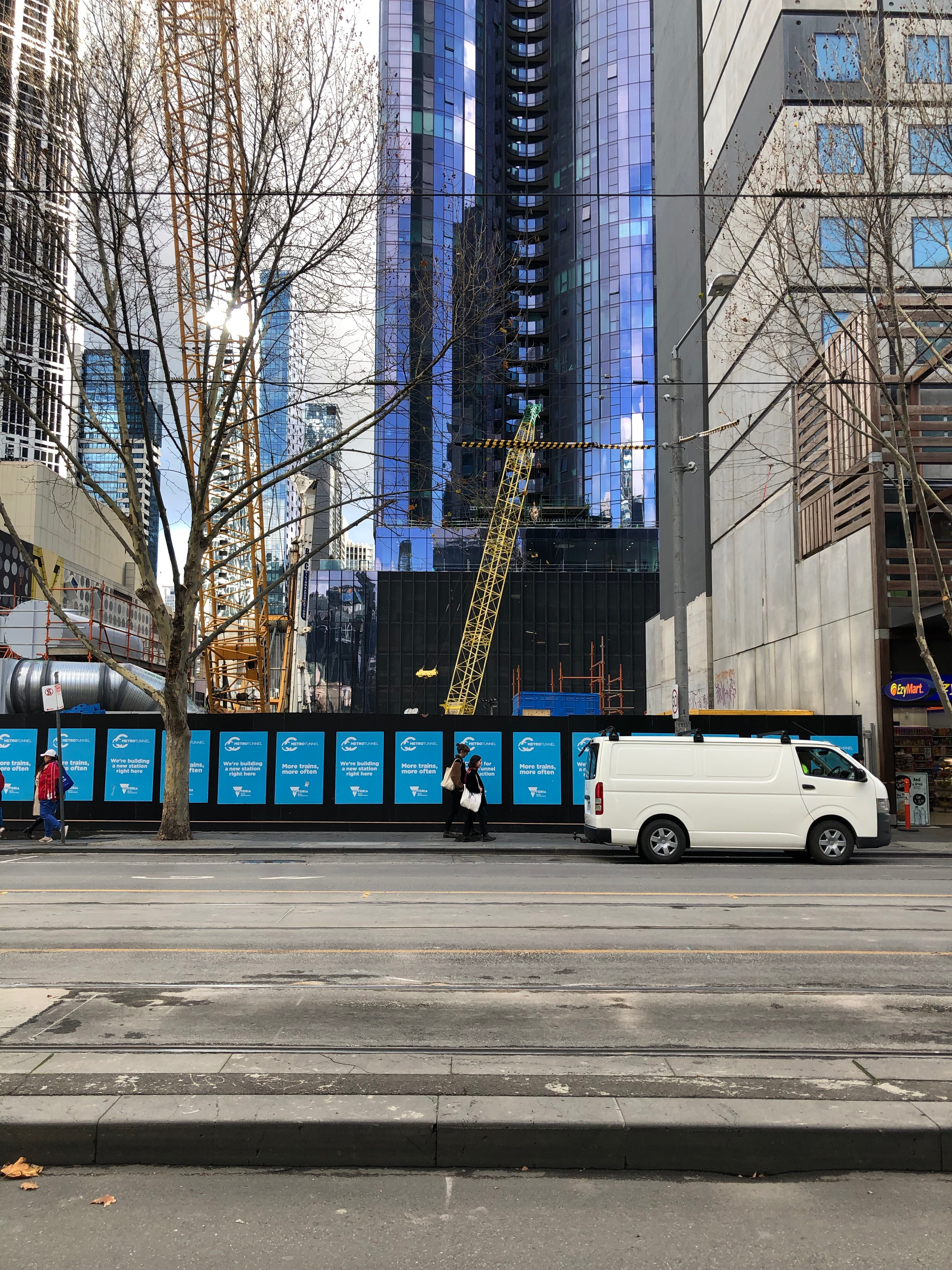
State Library station construction site, 2019

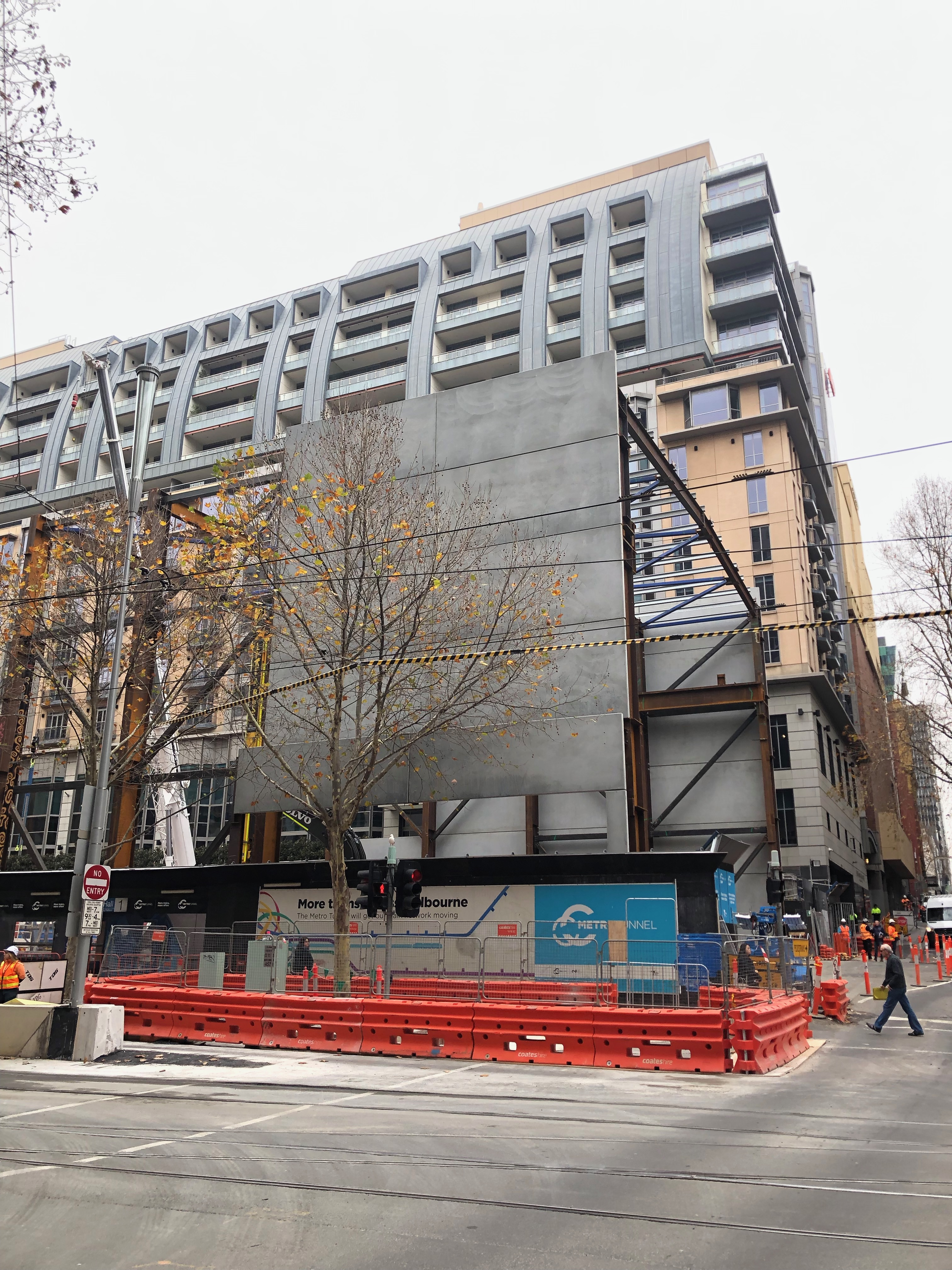
Town Hall station construction site on Swanston St with under construction acoustic shed, 2019

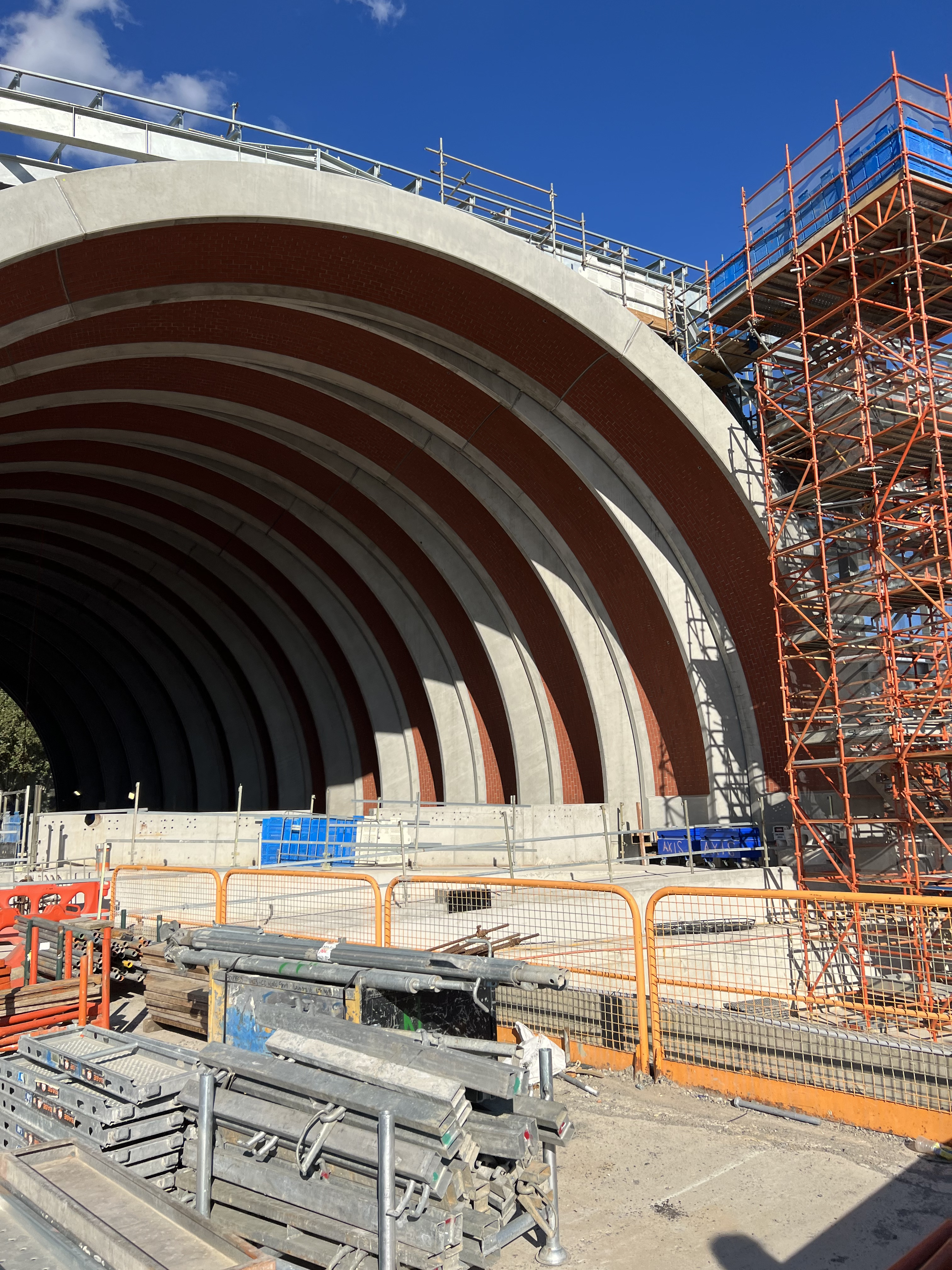
Arden station entrance under construction, March 2022

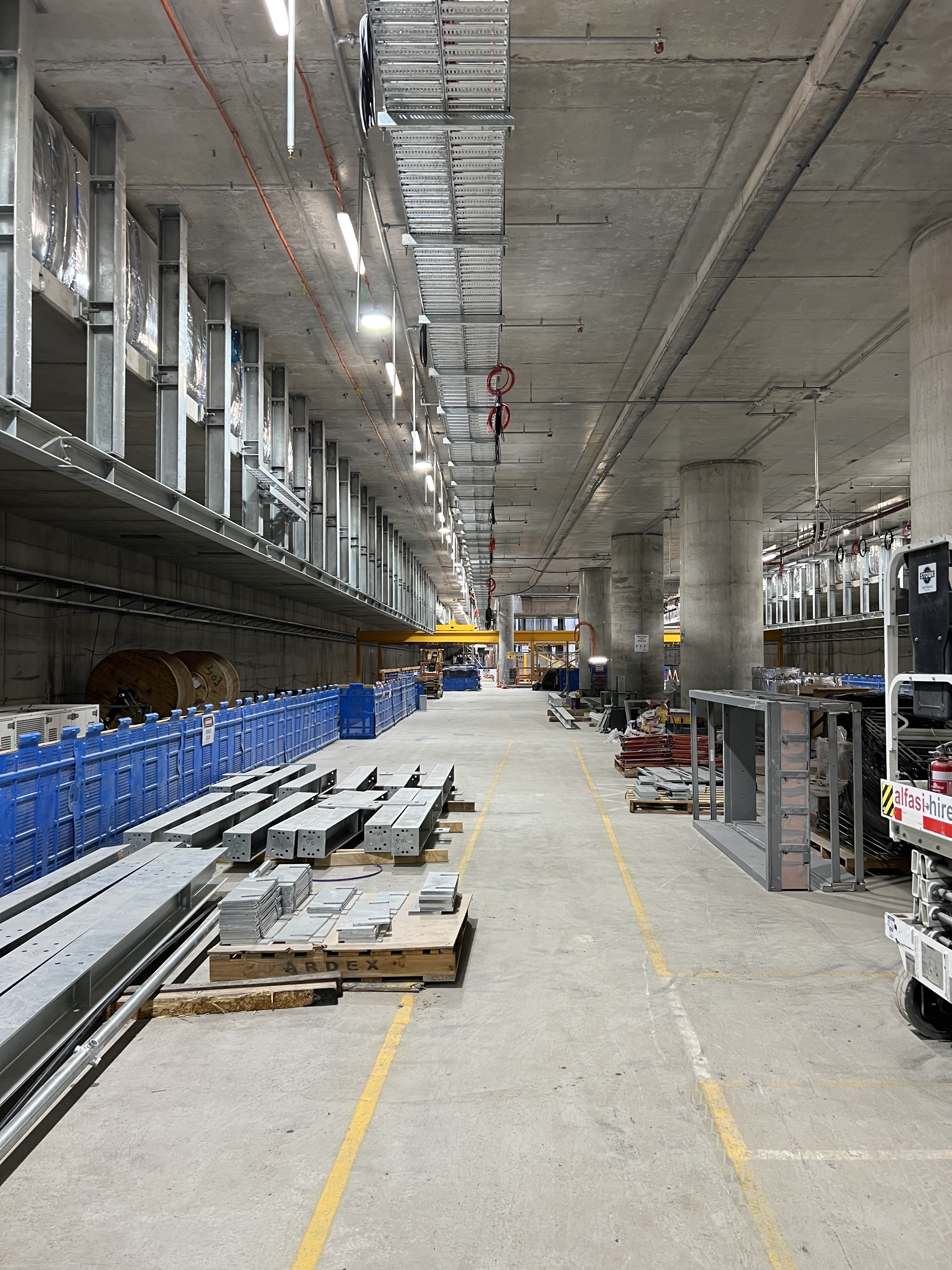
Melbourne Arden station platforms under construction, March 2022

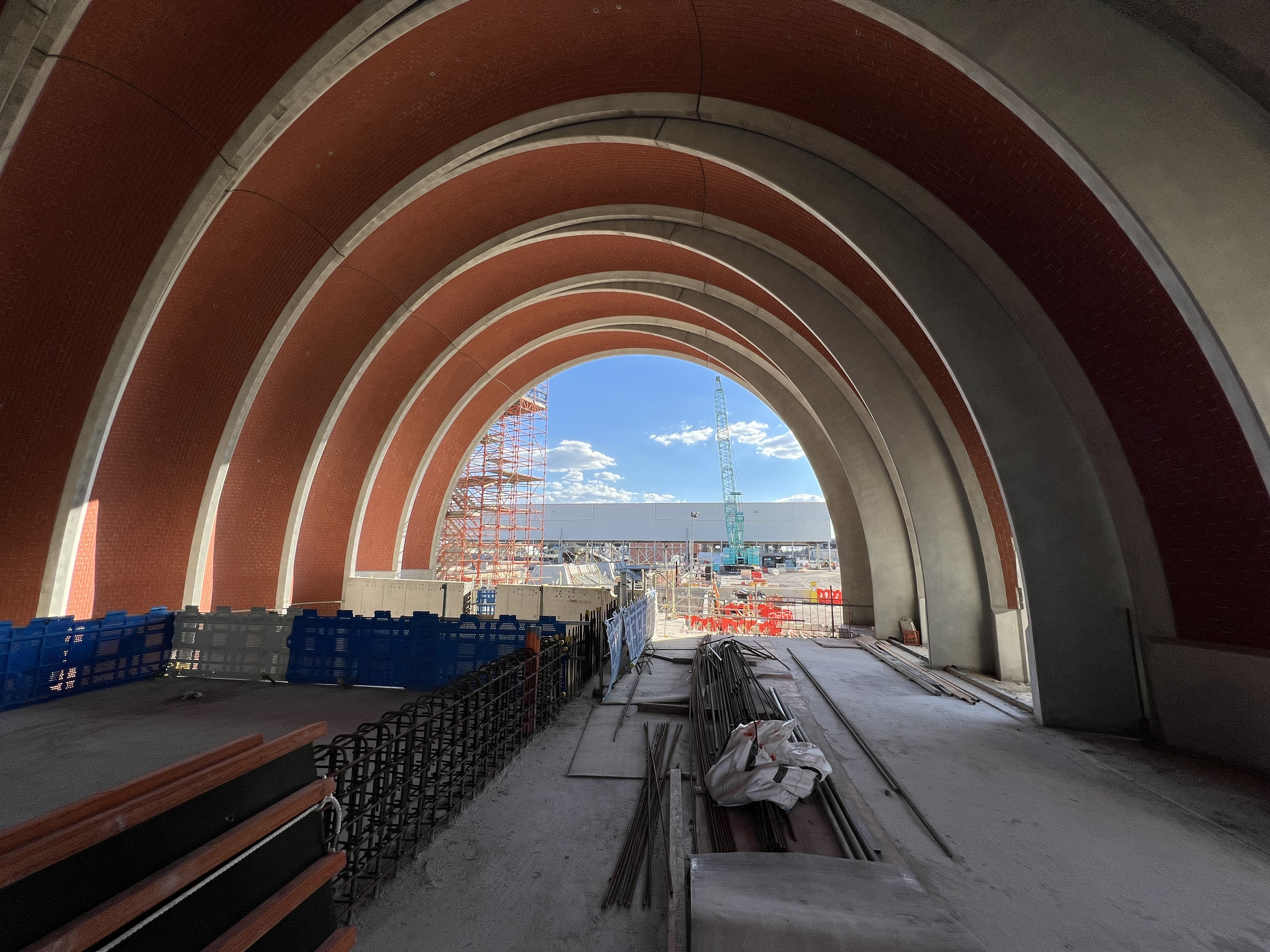
Melbourne Arden station entrance under construction, March 2022

==== Stations ====
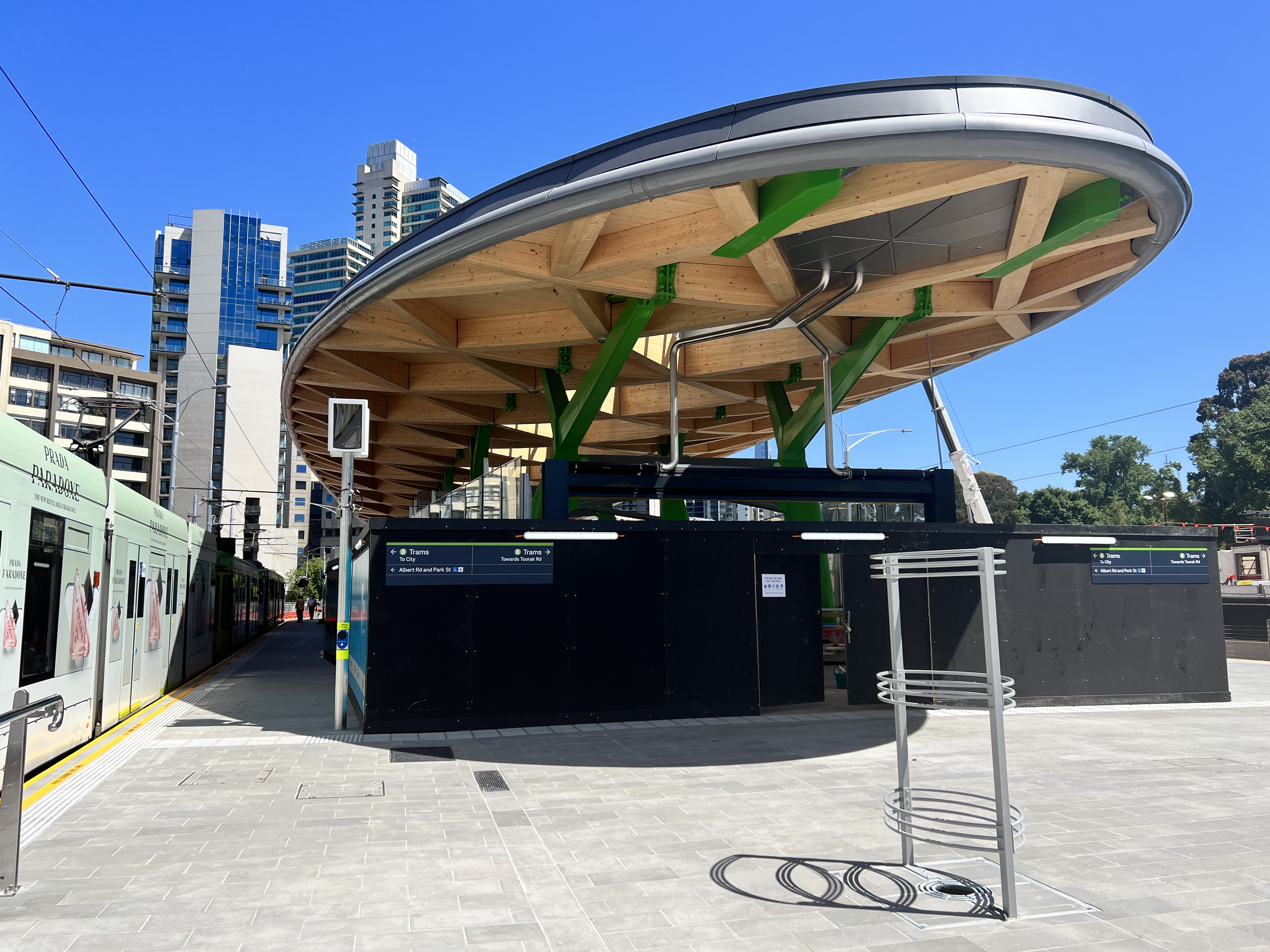
The new Anzac Station tram interchange was opened to tram passengers in December 2022. Pictured is the wooden canopy that will sit above the future Metro station entrance.

With tunnelling complete in mid-2021, the project's main focus moved on to station excavation, construction and fit-out. The project's five metro stations were designed by RSHP, Hassell and Weston Williamson.

Road-headers broke through at the platform tunnels of Town Hall station in August 2021 as the major excavation phase on the two CBD stations neared completion. The "trinocular" construction method involved the construction of three overlapping tunnels with vaulted ceilings. Town Hall was excavated to a depth of 33 m (108 ft) below street level, with the station platforms to sit 27 m (89 ft) below street level. This followed the completion of road-header excavation of the platform caverns at State Library in 2020.

Construction on Arden station's aboveground structure ramped up in late 2021, and consisted of a unique entrance of 15 large brick arches. The design, intended to reflect the area's industrial heritage, consisted of 100,000 bricks hand-laid into concrete beams that rise to 15 m (49 ft) above the station entrance.

In 2022, acoustic sheds began to be dismantled at the Town Hall and Anzac station locations in order to allow construction of above-ground station structures.

Work began on a large wooden canopy at Anzac station in March 2022, which was constructed over the year using 190 cross-laminated timber panels. The canopy sits in a tram stop on St Kilda Road and will be Melbourne's first direct platform-to-platform tram/train interchange. In November 2022, the tram lines were rerouted over three weeks from their temporary route on the west side of the station to their permanent position on either side of the station entrance and interchange. The new tram interchange was opened in December 2022.

Work began on eight large, concrete concourse columns at Town Hall station in May 2023, with the columns installed by October. Major construction was completed first at Arden station in January 2024, followed by Parkville station in May of that year and Anzac station in September. Construction then moved to focus on the two CBD stations, which were the most complex and delayed. According to the builder's timelines, major construction at Town Hall and State Library was originally planned to be completed by June 2024 but due to shortages of key workers this was delayed to a likely completion of March 2025. Major construction at both stations was eventually completed in early October 2025.

=== Testing and commissioning ===
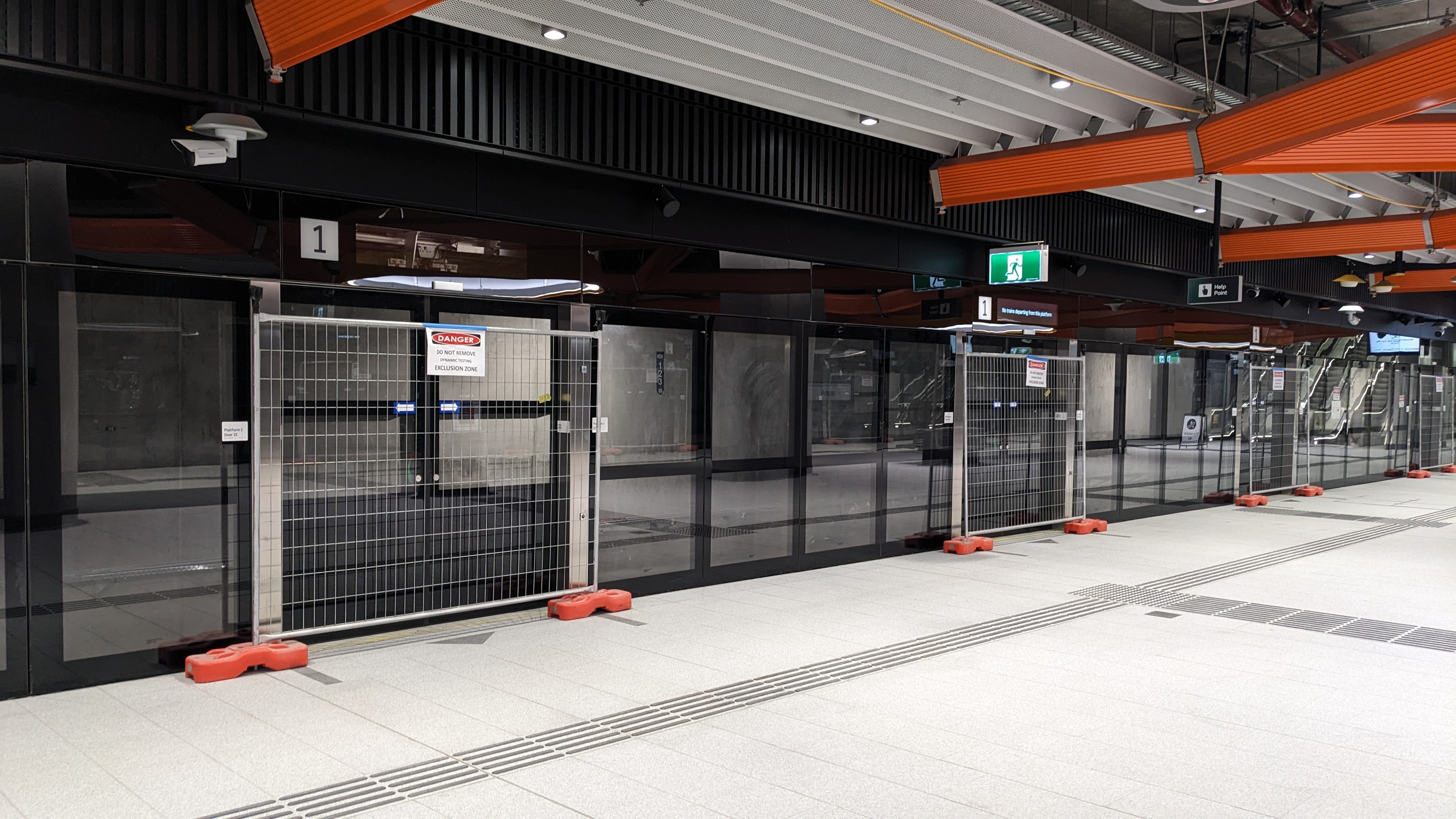
Fences over platform screen doors at Anzac Station in October 2024.

With track, wiring, signalling and platform screen doors installed, in July 2023 the first test train was successfully sent through the tunnel. Trains were running at the full tunnel speed of 80 km/h (50 mph) by August 2023. The day before announcing his retirement then-Premier Daniel Andrews, whose government initiated the project in 2015, rode a test train through the tunnel at full speed, telling local media it was the best moment of his premiership. In October the first passenger services on the Cranbourne and Pakenham lines began operating under high-capacity signalling in preparation for integrating the lines with the Metro Tunnel. This was the first time moving-block signalling had been retrofitted to an existing network in Australia.

In October 2025, the government announced the tunnel would open for some limited off-peak services in December 2025 in addition to the current City Loop services towards Sunbury, Cranbourne and Pakenham, as part of the "Summer Start".

The Metro Tunnel opened ahead of schedule to the public on 30 November 2025, with the first service leaving Sunbury at 9:44 am, arriving in the tunnels at 10:09 am at Arden. From opening until 1 February 2026, all of Melbourne's public transport will be free on weekends.

The "Big Switch" allowed a network shuffle and full services on the Metro Tunnel to commence from 1 February 2026. From February 2026, the Sunbury, Cranbourne and Pakenham lines began exclusively use the tunnel and the Frankston line returned to the City Loop. Werribee and Williamstown line services initially ran to Flinders Street and terminated there until mid-2026 when level crossing removals on the Werribee line will be complete, where it will through run with the Sandringham line.

=== Public reception ===
While most services ran on time, "congestion and confusion" was reported at Caulfield station in first day of full service on the line.

A major electrical outage on the third day of full operation saw passengers stuck on two trains for up to two hours. A lack of signage at Melbourne CBD stations directing passengers to City Loop trains, which were unaffected, compounded the issues faced by passengers using the new tunnel. Jeremy Burge told ABC Melbourne that "staff were having to verbally tell people to turn around" due to lack of on-screen information.

== Project description ==
Interactive map showing the Metro Tunnel's finalised route in grey. The tunnel will eventually connect the Sunbury line (top left) with the Pakenham and Cranbourne lines (bottom right).

The project consists of two 9-kilometre (5.6 mi) rail tunnels between South Kensington and South Yarra via the CBD with five new underground stations. A new cross-city metro style line has been created that runs from the north-west to the south-east of Melbourne, linking the Sunbury line with the Cranbourne and Pakenham lines. The line is also planned to eventually run to Melbourne Airport via the planned Melbourne Airport rail link, but that project has been repeatedly put on hold and resurrected. The new line, like similar projects the Elizabeth line and the Paris RER, is a hybrid suburban and rapid transit system, running a high-frequency rapid service in the inner city but also running trains to Melbourne's outer commuter suburbs.

The five new city stations are underground and feature 230 m (755 ft)-long platforms, large concourses, and full-height platform-screen doors, a first for Melbourne. As part of the project, a new fleet of 65 High Capacity Metro Trains were ordered to add further capacity to the network, the first of which entered service in 2020. These trains are the most advanced and highest capacity in Melbourne, and will run on the Metro Tunnel corridor as 7-car trains. They can be expanded to 10-car trains in the future with the new underground stations long enough to accommodate the extended trains. A new stabling and maintenance depot was built in Pakenham East to house the new fleet.

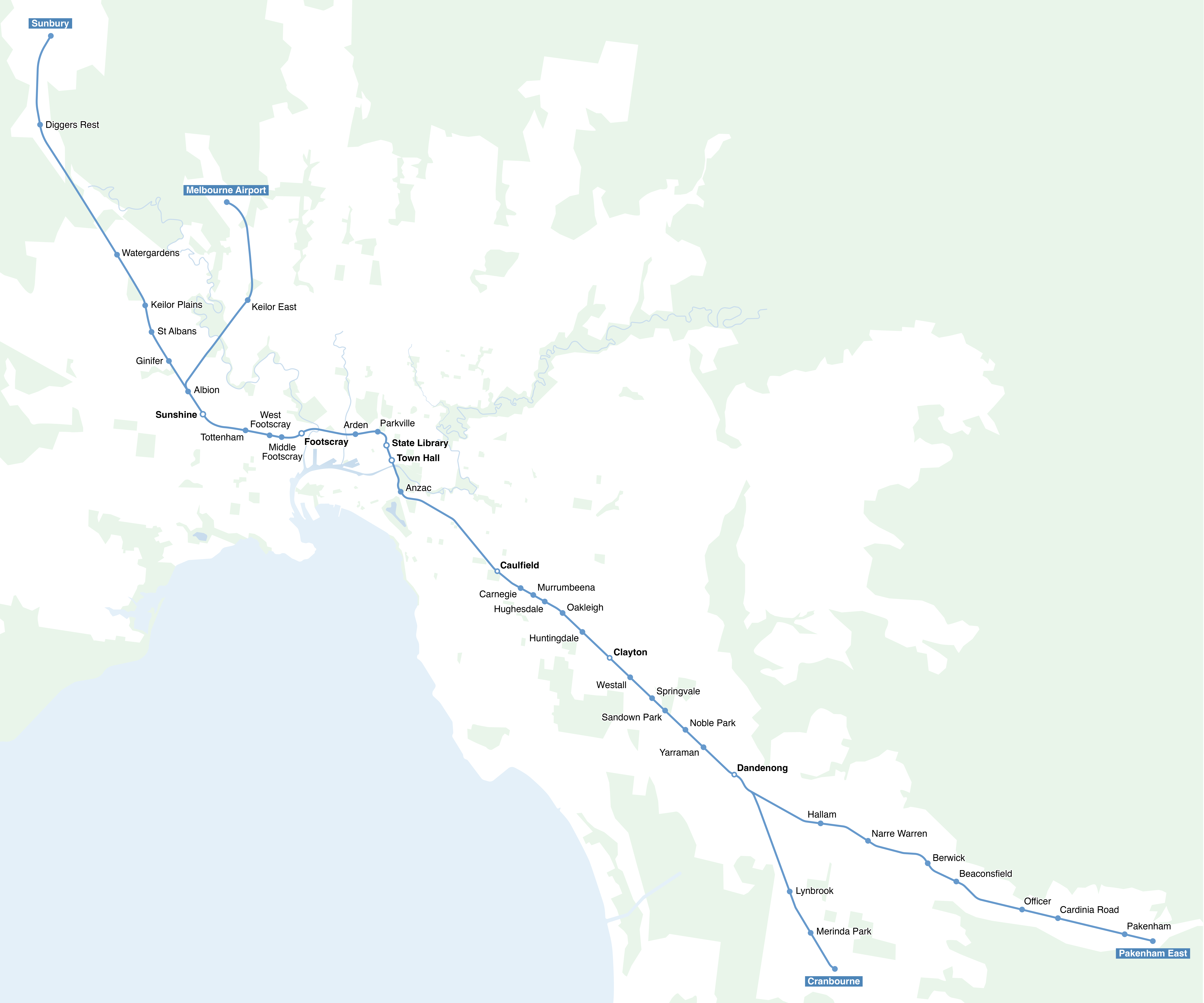
Geographic map showing the planned cross-city rapid transit corridor created by the Metro Tunnel at its full extent, including the proposed Airport Rail Link and short extension to Pakenham East.

Three of the new stations – Arden, Parkville, and Anzac – are cut-and-cover box designs, and involved digging down to build the station. The two CBD stations – State Library and Town Hall – are mined stations beneath Swanston Street, built using a unique "trinocular" construction method of three overlapping caverns dug by road headers and featuring high ceilings, an arched vault design and 19 m (62 ft) wide platforms. With the exception of Arden, all of the stations feature multiple entrances. Anzac features a direct tram-train interchange with a large wooden canopy, while Arden will anchor a major urban renewal project in Melbourne's inner north. The two CBD stations will feature large transit-oriented development and retail.

As part of the project, a new third turnback platform will be built at West Footscray station. High capacity signalling in the form of moving-block communication-based signalling technology is used along the Metro Tunnel corridor and on the Airport branch to allow trains to run through the tunnel up to a 40-second frequency. This is the first time high-capacity signalling has been installed on a legacy rail corridor in Australia. Station platforms were also extended along the corridor to allow for the new trains.

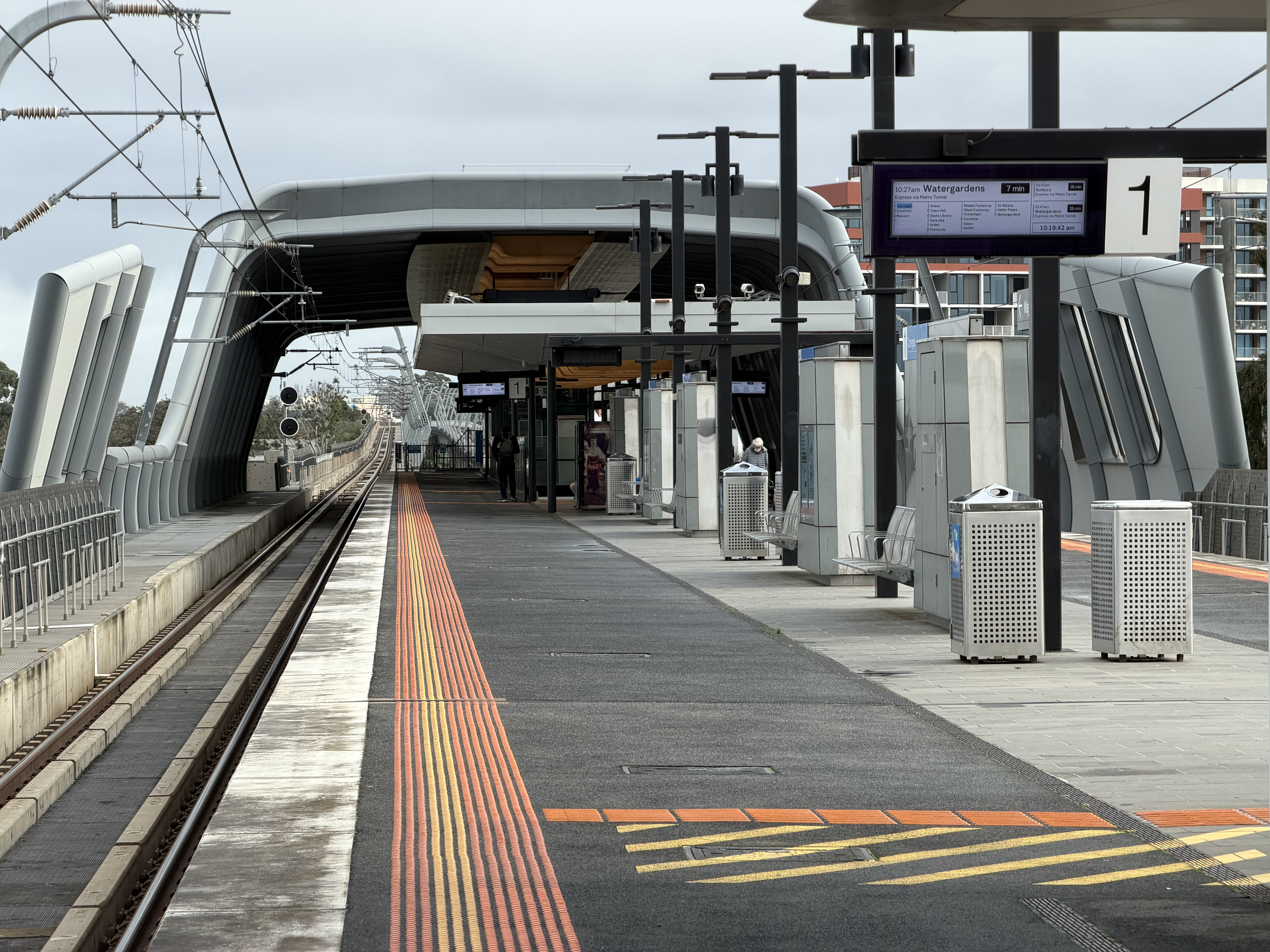
Rebuilt, elevated Carnegie railway station on the Pakenham and Cranbourne lines, which formed as part of the Metro Tunnel corridor.

Along with the Metro Tunnel project works, there are a number of associated infrastructure projects by the Victorian Government to upgrade the corridor, and the wider rail system in Melbourne, to rapid transit standards. The Sunbury Line Upgrade project, announced in the 2019 state budget, is upgrading the corridor from the tunnel to Sunbury and includes: platform extensions, accessibility upgrades, power and substation upgrades, new train stabling, and the removal of all level crossings on the Sunbury line to allow for High Capacity Metro Trains. The Cranbourne Line Upgrade is removing all remaining level crossings along the Cranbourne line, and has duplicated 8 km (5.0 mi) of track to allow higher frequency services on the branch. An extension of the Cranbourne line to Clyde is also planned, though has not yet been funded by the government.

The Level Crossing Removal Project has removed a number of other level crossings on the future Metro Tunnel corridor, including several on the Pakenham line and nine level crossings between Caulfield and Dandenong, in which four stations were rebuilt and 9 km (5.6 mi) of elevated rail constructed in 2017. The Pakenham line has also been extended a short distance, with a new station built at Pakenham East near the new rail depot for the line. This new station has been delivered by the Level Crossing Removal Project.

Together these projects will establish a fully grade-separated corridor with high-capacity signalling capable of running frequent services through the new tunnel. According to the project's business case, it will allow an extra 39,000 passengers to travel in the peak period each day, with a further 41,000 extra passengers if 10-car trains are introduced.

== Network changes ==
The Metro Tunnel created a new cross-city metro line when it connected the Sunbury, Cranbourne and Pakenham lines after full services commenced in February 2026.

When the Metro Tunnel first opened on 30 November 2025, it ran a limited service between peak periods. It had 20 minute frequencies from Westall to West Footscray station between 10:00am to 3:00pm on weekdays. On weekends, services ran every 20 minutes from 10:00am to 7:00pm between Westall and West Footscray, every 40 minutes from East Pakenham, and every 60 minutes from Sunbury. Regular services on the Pakenham, Cranbourne and Sunbury lines still ran full time in the City Loop.

On 1 February 2026, the Sunbury, Cranbourne and Pakenham lines fully ceased operation in the City Loop and the Frankston line returned to the City Loop with dedicated use of the Caulfield tunnel. Due to these changes, the Frankston line has ceased through-routing with the Werribee and Williamstown lines. Instead, the Sandringham line now through-routes with those lines via the Flinders Street Viaduct. The extra capacity allows more peak services across the network, particularly for the Craigieburn and Upfield lines, which no longer share a single loop track with the Sunbury line. Services run every 3–4 minutes between Watergardens and Dandenong during the peaks, with trains running at least every 10 minutes between West Footscray and Dandenong (excluding Night Network services).

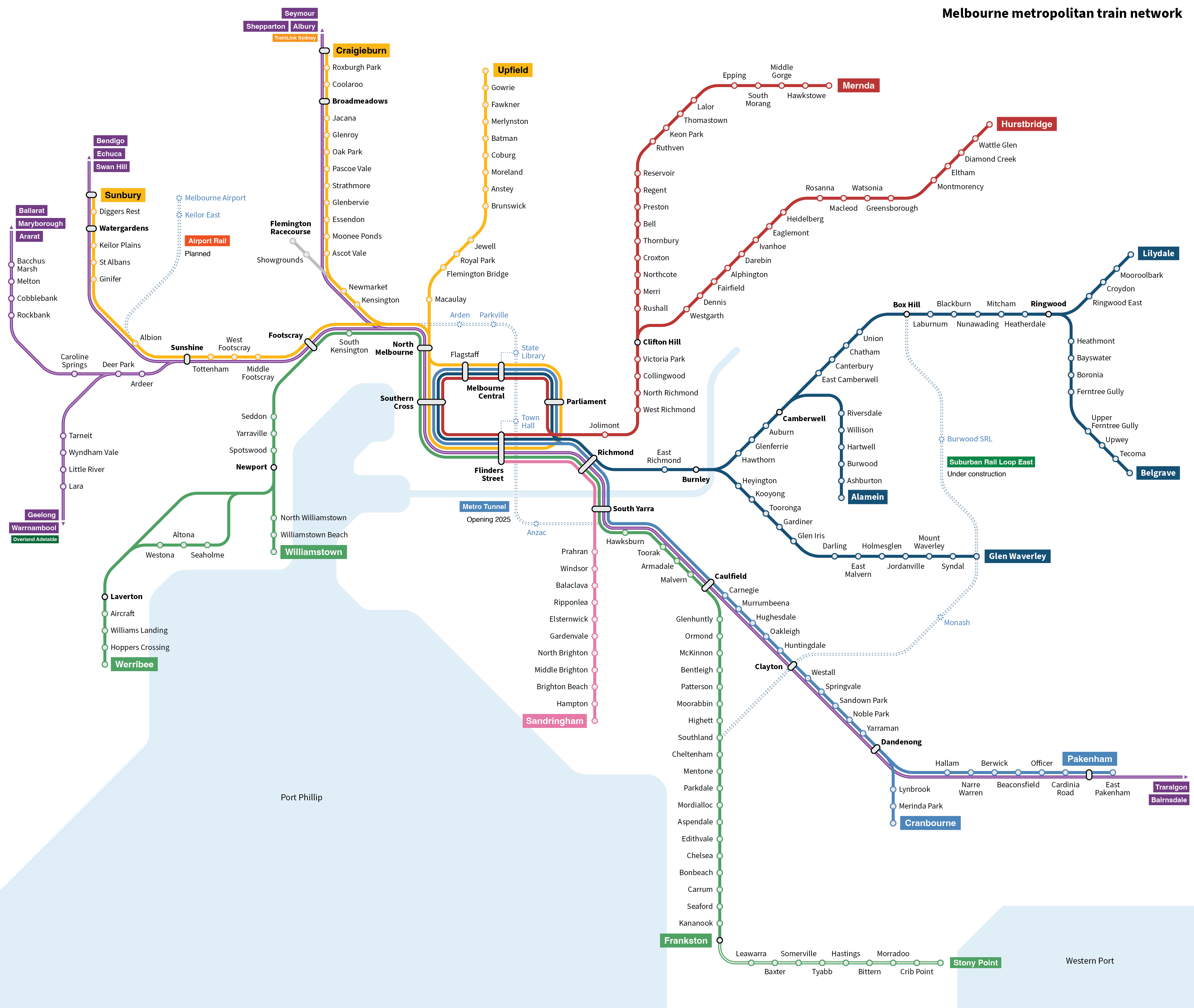
Melbourne's rail network in 2025 before the Metro Tunnel opened

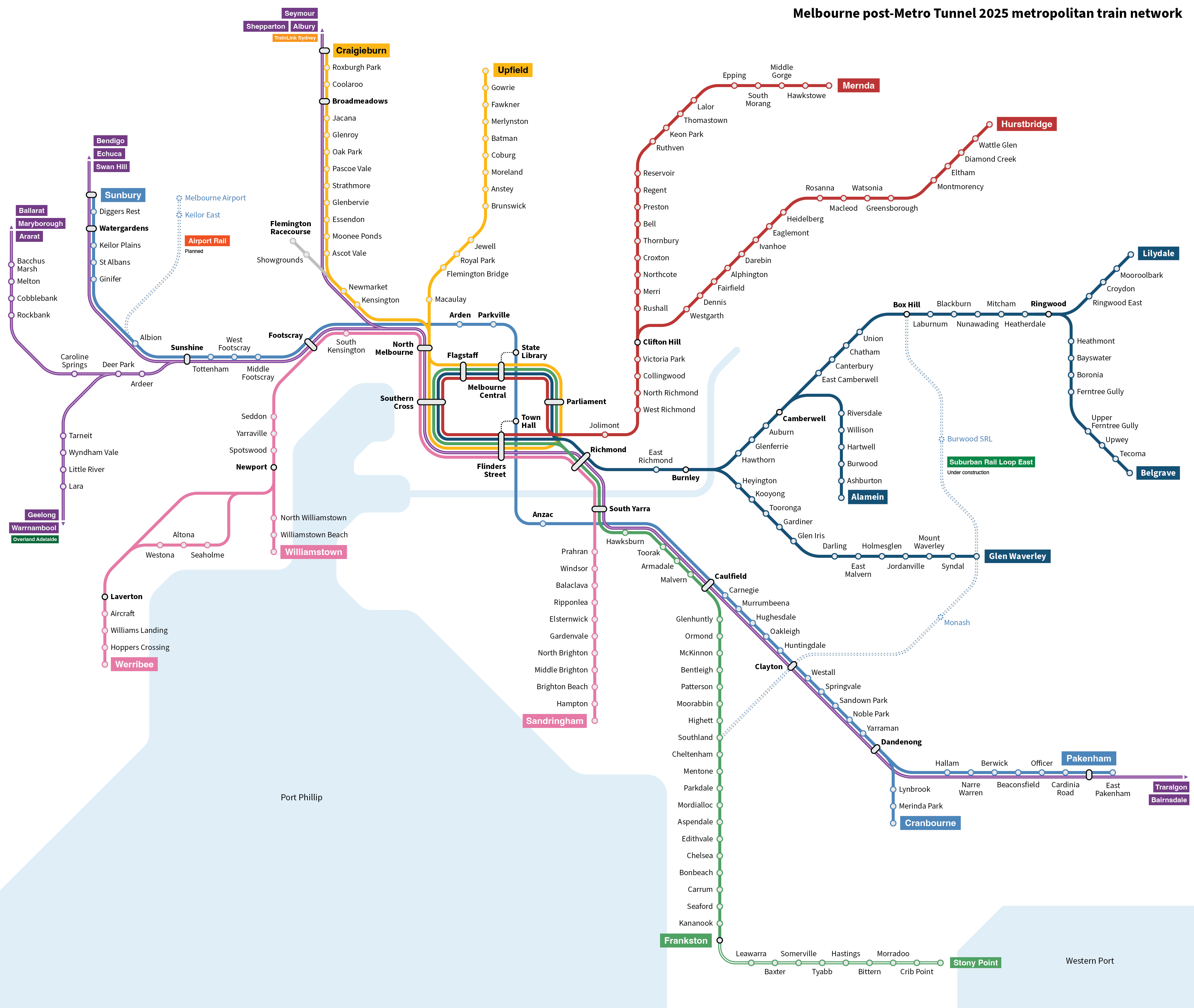
Post-Metro Tunnel 2026 network showing the reorganisation of lines

The 2016 project business case envisioned the tunnel including a newly electrified branch to Melton in the west. The business case planned for an initial 19 trains per hour during the peak running into the tunnel from the east and 18 from the west, increasing to 21 from the east and 23 from the west under the extended program after the Melton branch was added. Since then, this plan has been superseded by plans to run the Melbourne Airport rail link through the tunnel as a branch in the west.

In the 2022/23 state budget, money was allocated to train and employ 300 extra train drivers and station staff to allow Metro Trains Melbourne to operate the tunnel and the increased services across the network in 2025.

=== Tram network ===
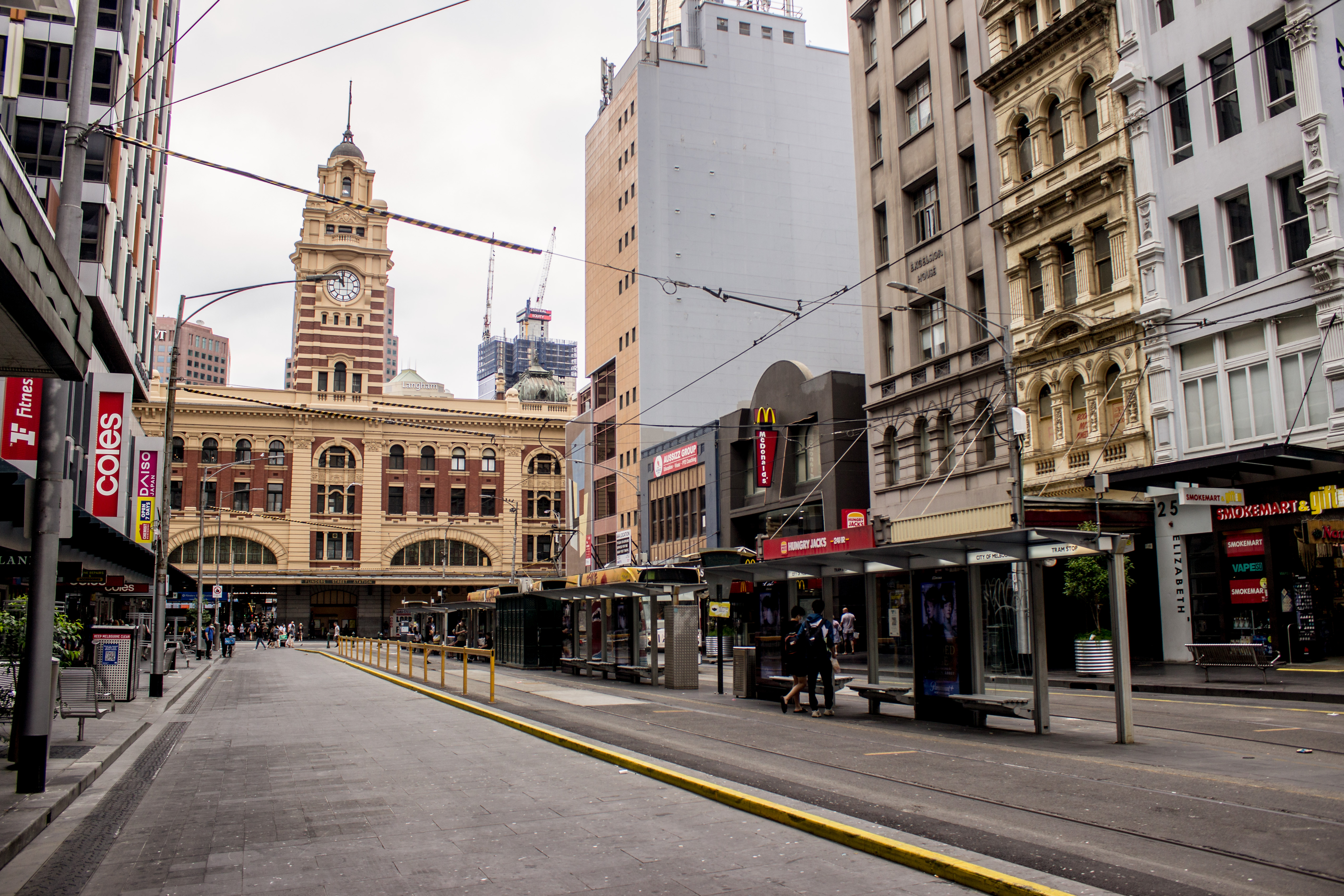
The current Elizabeth Street tram terminus was proposed to become a through-route for trams under Metro Tunnel plans.

Relieving congestion on the busy Swanston Street tram corridor is a key stated goal of the Metro Tunnel project, and the opening of the tunnel was also planned to result in major changes to the tram network in the central city.

Several tram connections and upgrades were proposed as part of the project. These included new track along Park Street in South Melbourne and on Flinders Street in the CBD, allowing trams to turn onto Flinders from the current tram terminus on Elizabeth Street. This would have allowed some tram routes to be directed away from Swanston Street to streets in the western end of the CBD. The aim of these changes was to more evenly balance services in the central city and reduce reliance on Elizabeth and Flinders Streets. The 2016 business case envisioned routes 5 and 64 being rerouted to Docklands via Park and Spencer Streets, and Elizabeth Street trams continuing down Flinders Street to terminate outside the CBD at Melbourne Park and Jolimont.

By January 2025 many of the proposed tram changes had been cancelled. This included the new track along Park Street, with the previous planned changes to routes 5 and 64 no longer possible. Other planned changes have not been built or are unclear on their future delivery.

In 2017, new tram tracks were installed on Toorak Road West in South Yarra and trams were temporarily removed from Domain Road to allow construction of Anzac station, at the same time tram routes 8 and 55 were combined to form the new route 58.

== Stations ==
The project involves construction of five new underground railway stations:

=== Arden ===
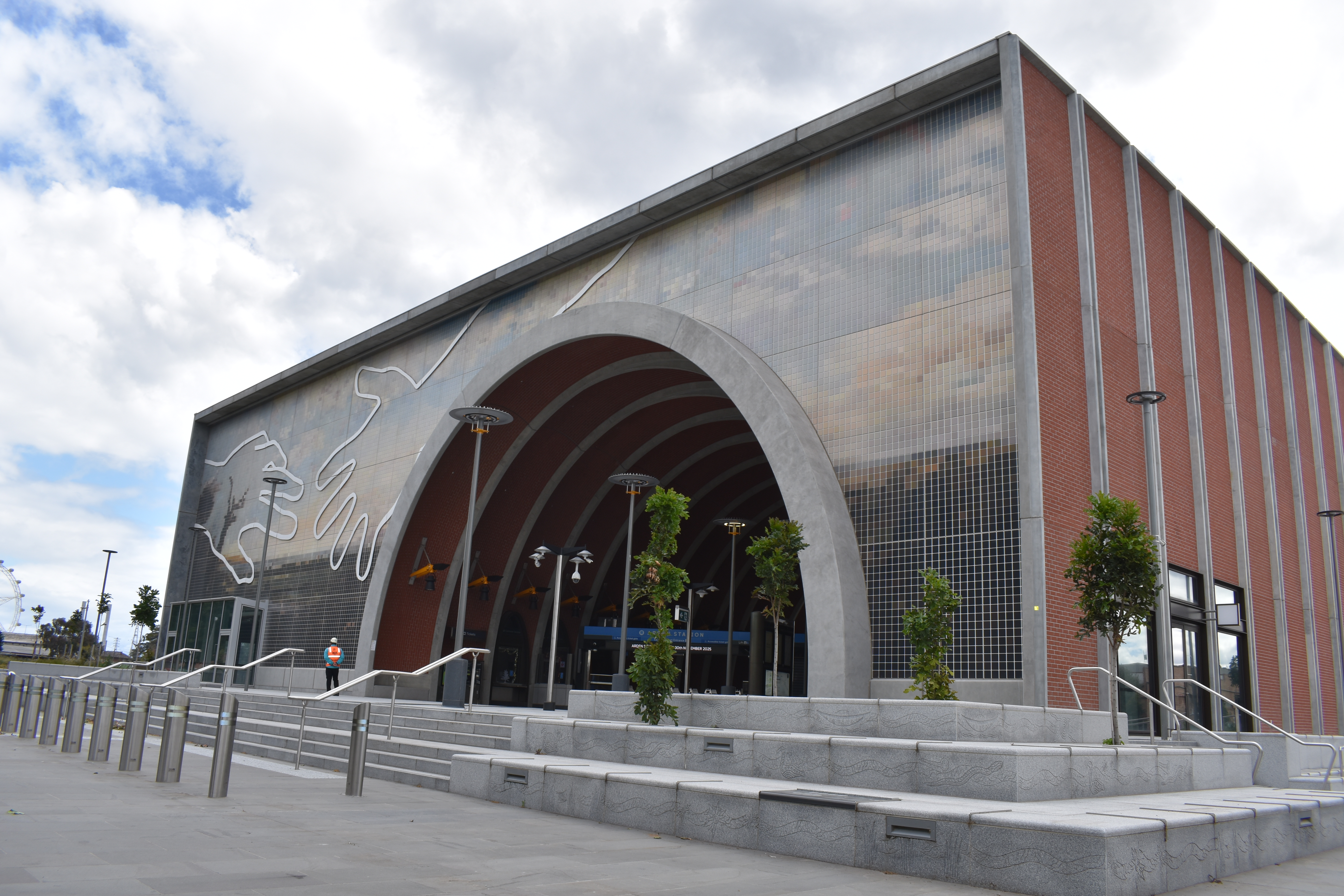
Arden station building and entrance, November 2025

Arden station is located near the intersection of Arden and Laurens Streets in North Melbourne. It is planned to allow for urban renewal of the formerly industrial suburb, and is expected to serve some 25,000 residents. The station entrance is located on Laurens Street, between Queensberry and Arden streets to provide direct access to existing residential, retail and commercial areas east of Laurens Street. Provision will be made for an additional entrance at the western end of the station to service the Arden area as it develops in the future. Arden Station is within walking distance of the North Melbourne Recreation Centre, Arden Street Oval and the existing route 57 tram.

=== Parkville ===
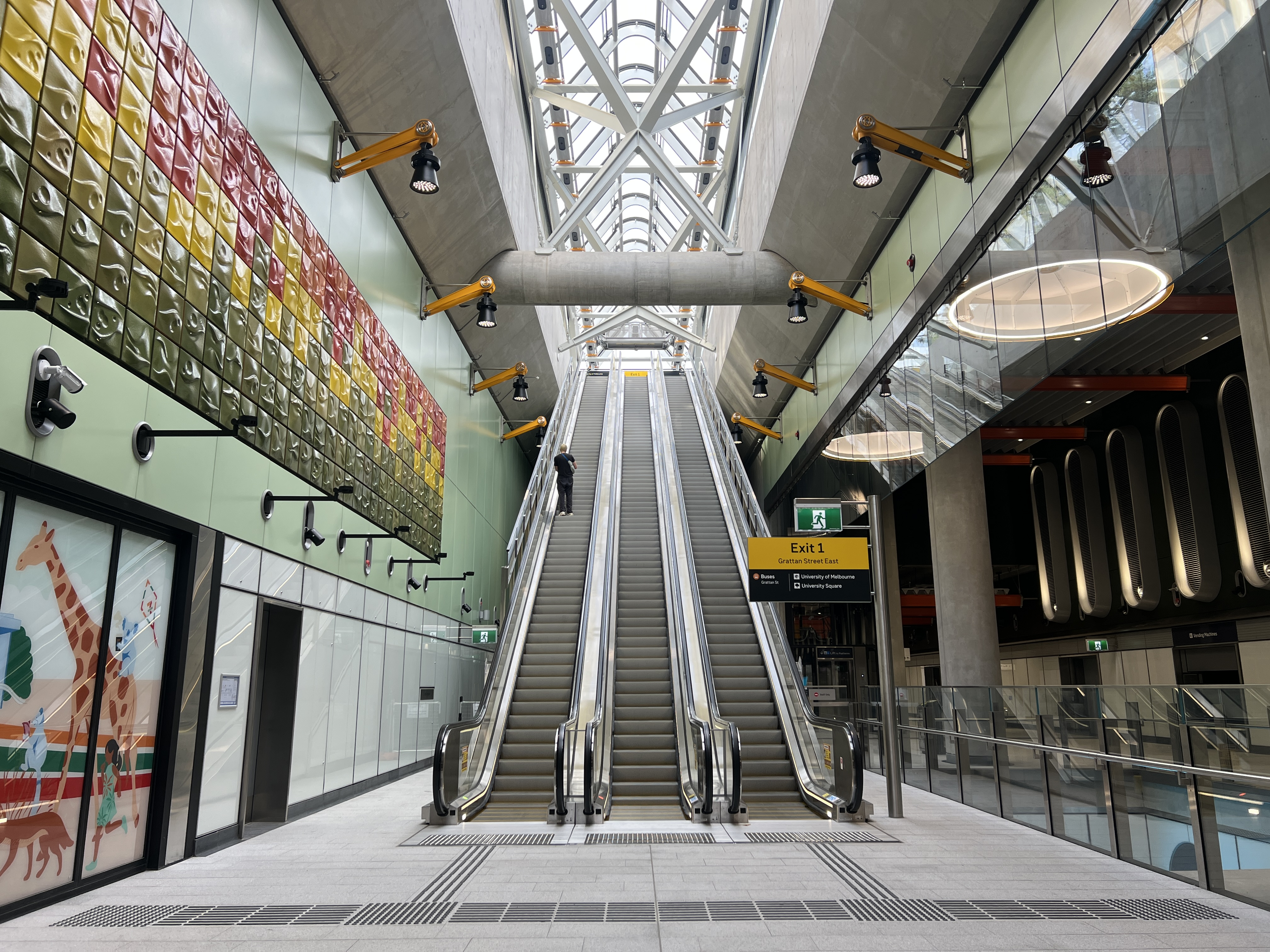
Parkville station concourse looking towards the Grattan Street entrance, November 2025

Parkville station is located on the intersection of Grattan Street and Royal Parade in Parkville, in proximity to the Royal Melbourne Hospital and Melbourne University. The station relieves pressure on north–south tram routes and the congested 401 bus service between North Melbourne station and the university/hospital precinct. New tram stops are to be constructed as part of the project allowing for seamless tram and train interchanges. The station services the busy hospital and research precinct, including the Victorian Comprehensive Cancer Centre. The station is expected to service 60,000 passengers each day by 2031.

=== State Library ===
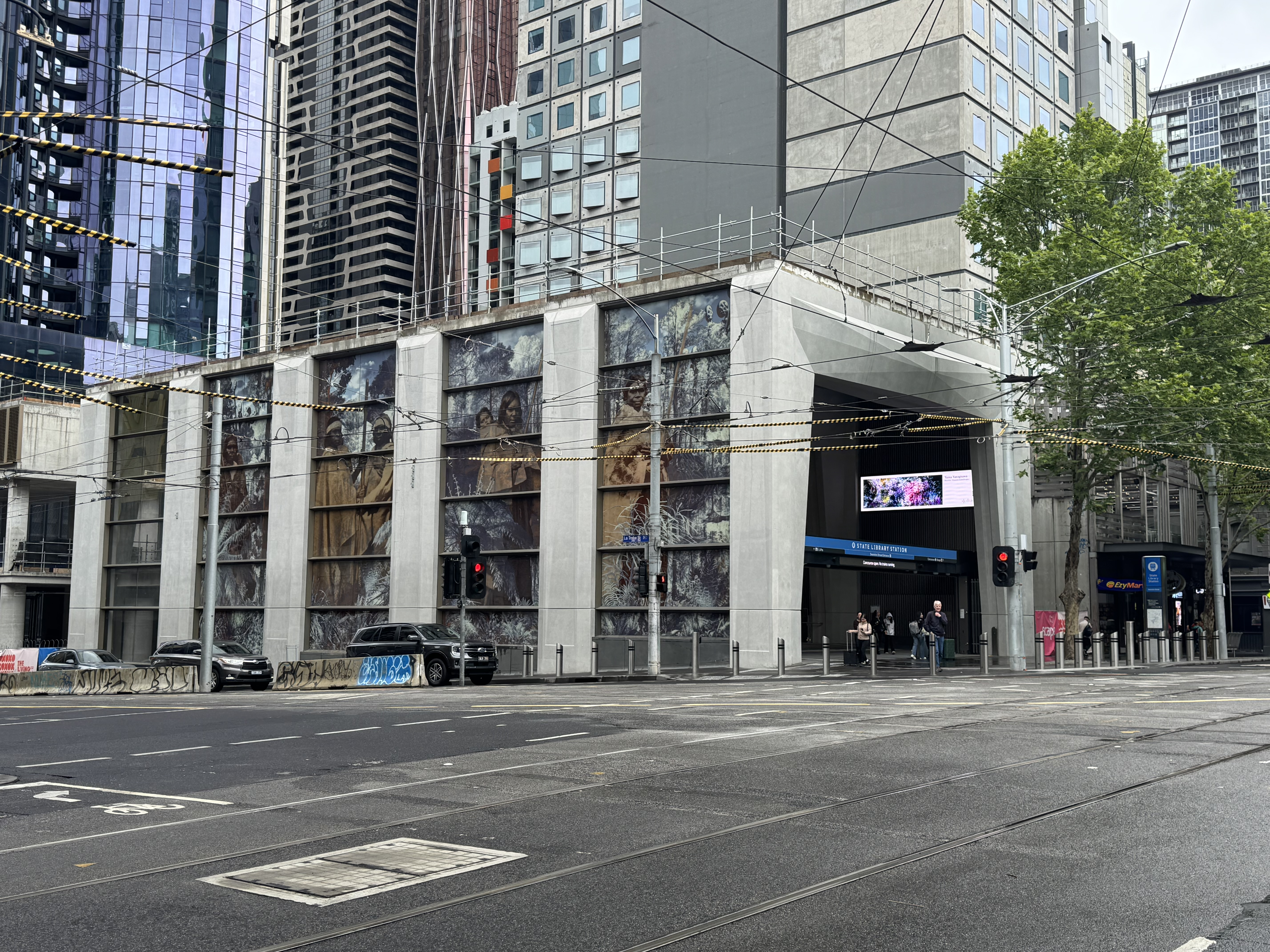
State Library main Swanston Street entrance, November 2025

State Library station is located on the intersection of Swanston and La Trobe Streets in the Melbourne CBD above the existing Melbourne Central station. This allows for interchange opportunities between stations and existing lines and relieve pressure on Swanston Street tram routes. The station services the northern end of the CBD, as well as the State Library Victoria and RMIT University. The line continues under Swanston Street running below the existing City Loop tunnels. The station is able to serve up to 40,000 passengers during peak periods.

=== Town Hall ===
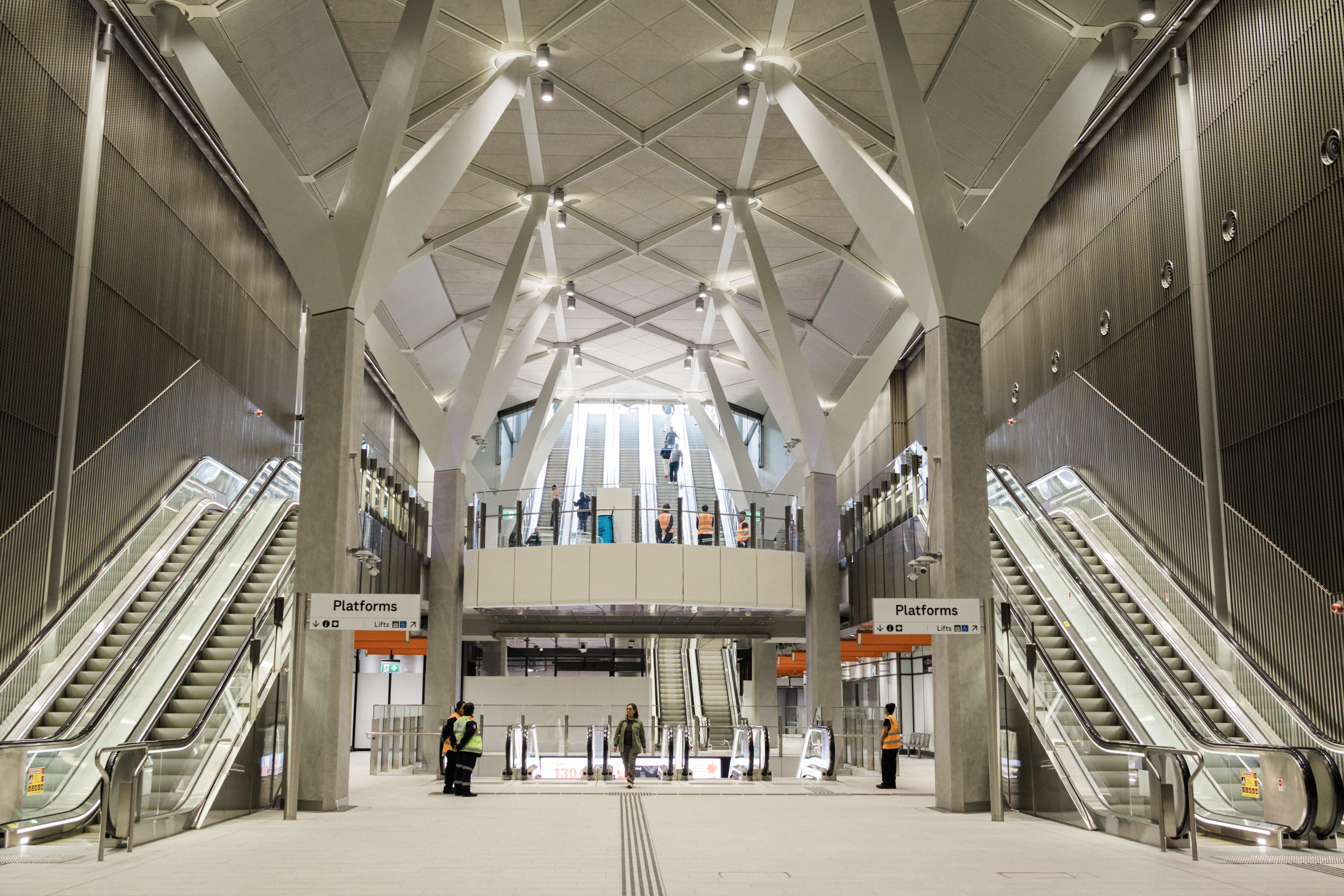
Town Hall station's main concourse near the Collins Street and Swanston Street entrance, December 2025

Town Hall station is located on the corner of Swanston and Flinders Streets, with direct connections to Flinders Street station, adding further relief to tram services and servicing the southern end of the CBD. The station is near St Paul's Cathedral, the Arts Precinct, Southbank and Federation Square and have exits on Collins Street. The line proceeds south running below the Yarra River and the Burnley and Domain tunnels. The station is expected to serve some 55,000 passengers during peak periods.

=== Anzac ===
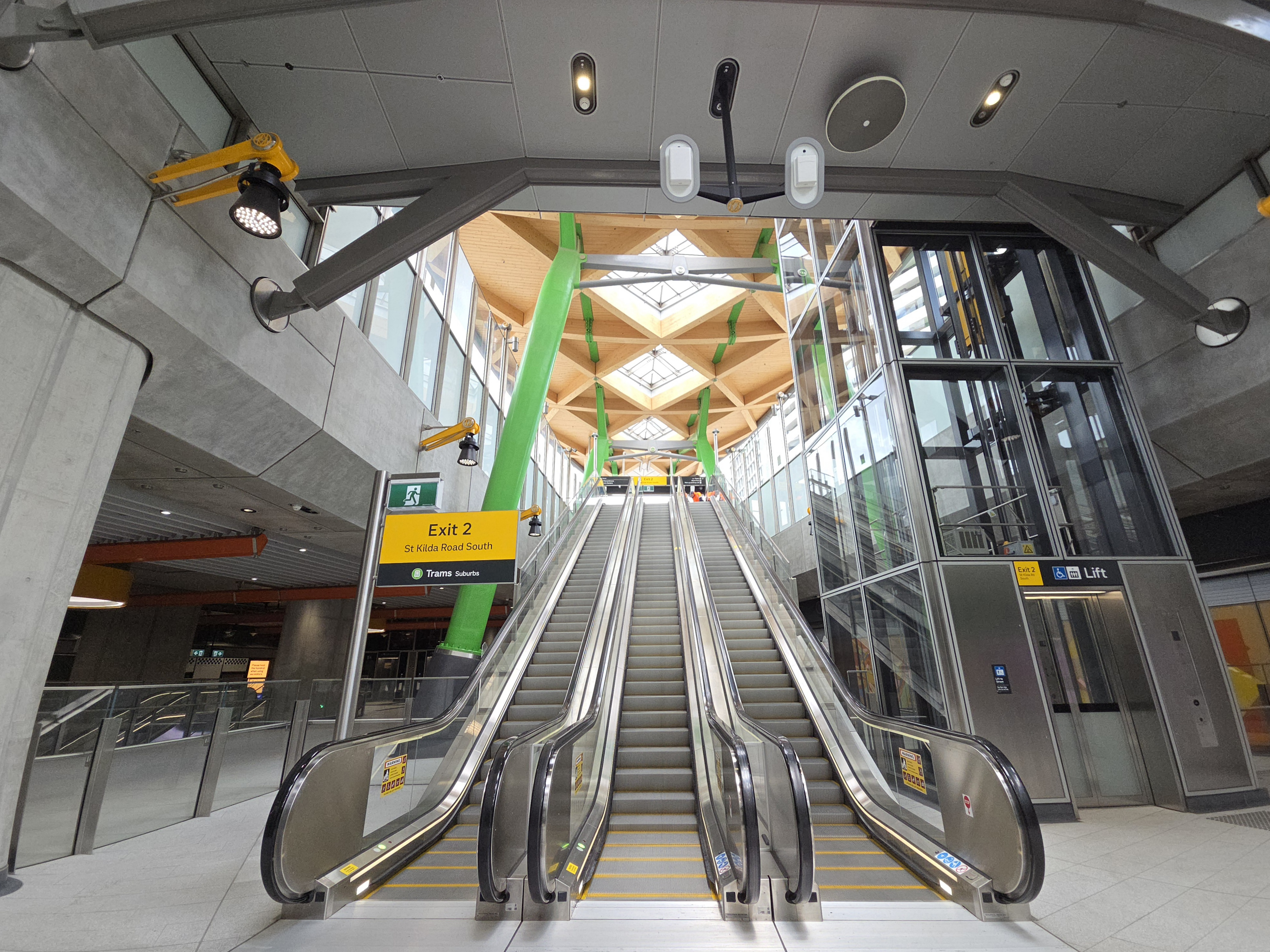
Anzac station concourse looking up into St Kilda Road, November 2025

Anzac station is located on St Kilda Road and Park Streets adjacent to the Domain Interchange, with interchange opportunities with existing St Kilda Road tram services. The station services the Shrine of Remembrance, the busy St Kilda Road office precinct, the Royal Botanic Gardens and Melbourne Grammar School. The station is expected to serve approximately 14,500 passengers during peak periods.

== Platform Screen Doors & PIDs ==
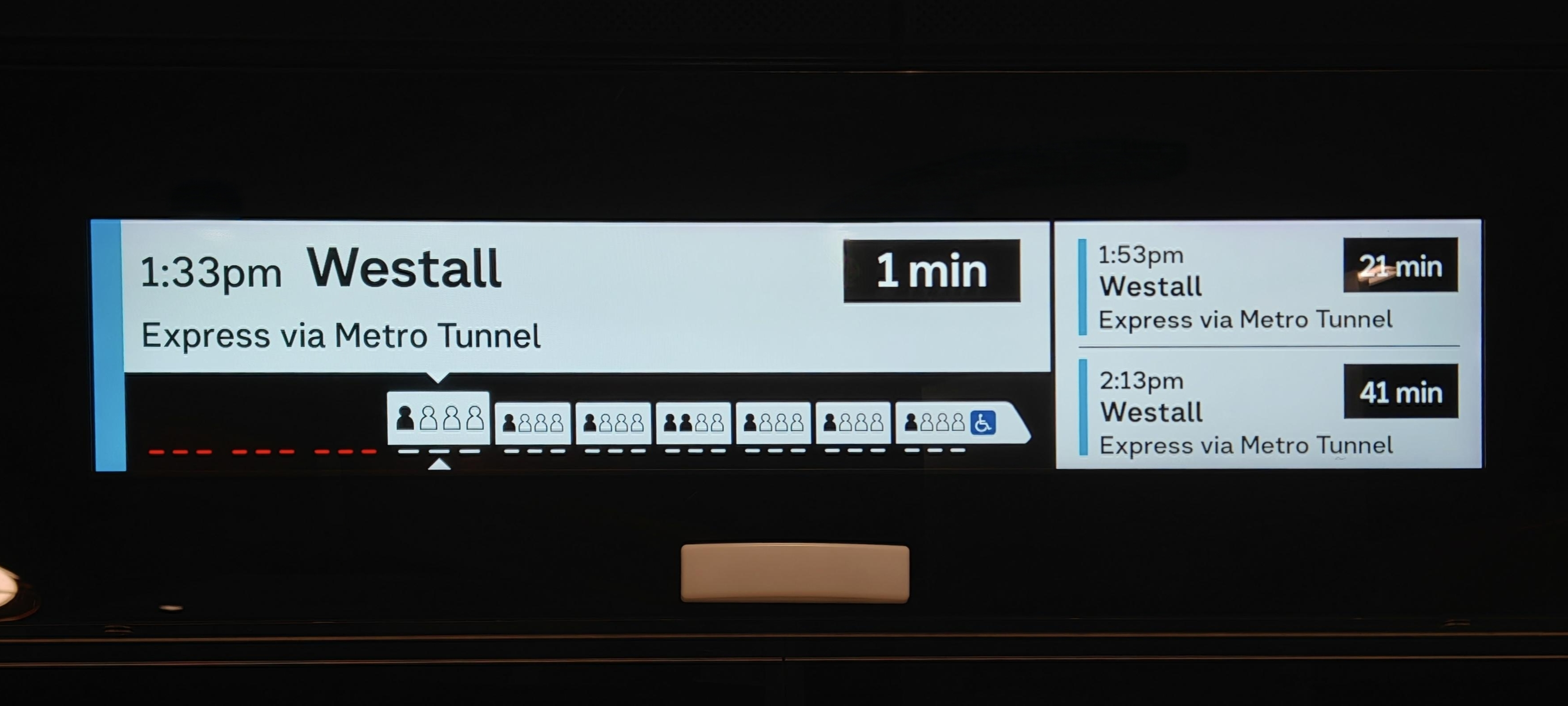
Platform Screen Door PID, Parkville Station

All stations on the Metro Tunnel are equipped with platform screen doors (PSDs) and passenger information displays (PIDs). The PSDs incorporate integrated line maps and real-time passenger information. The PIDs provide train arrival times, details of upcoming services, carriage position information, and, on some services, real-time carriage crowding levels.

== Promotions ==
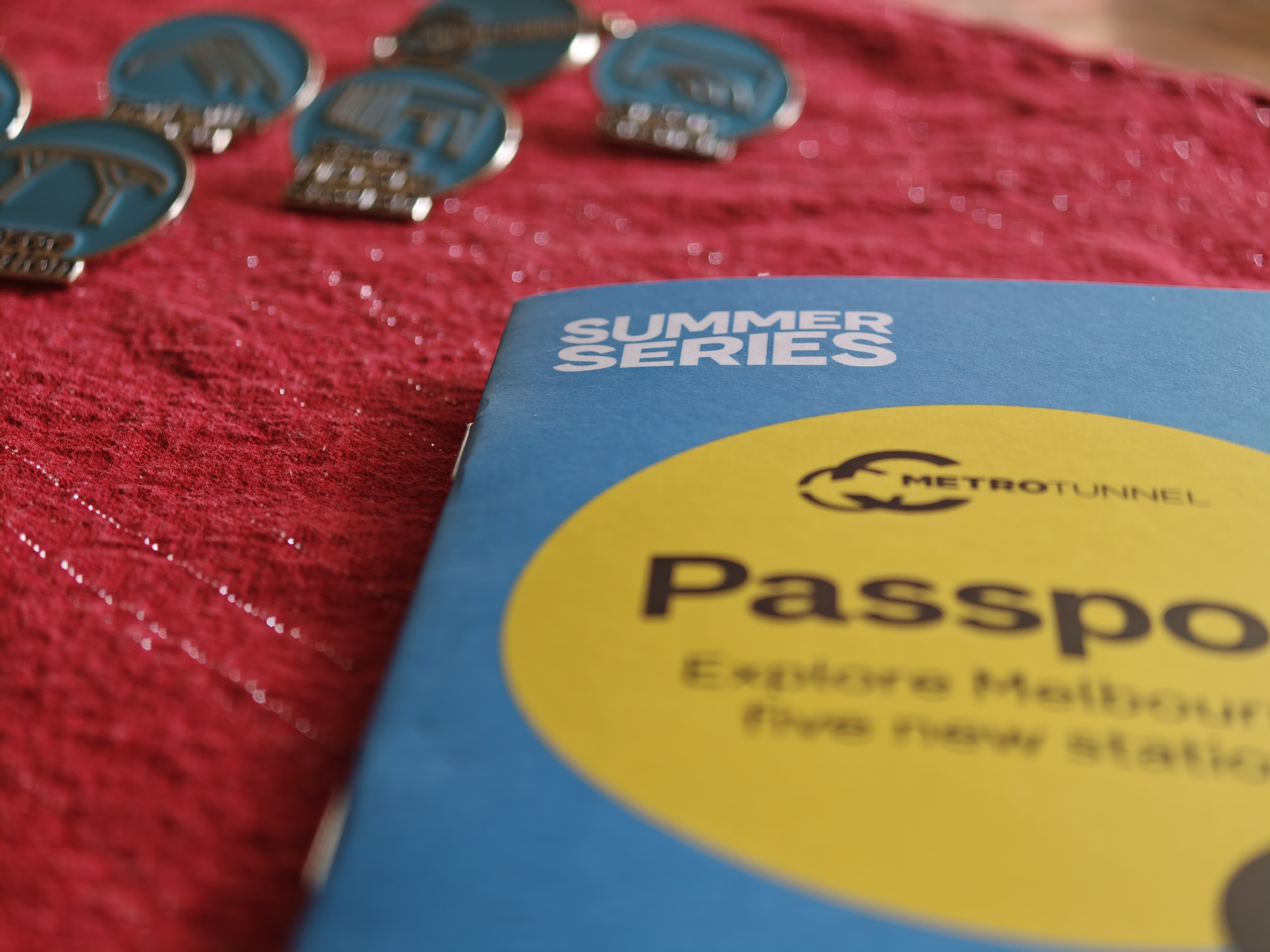
Promotional Passport and Pins

=== Summer Series ===
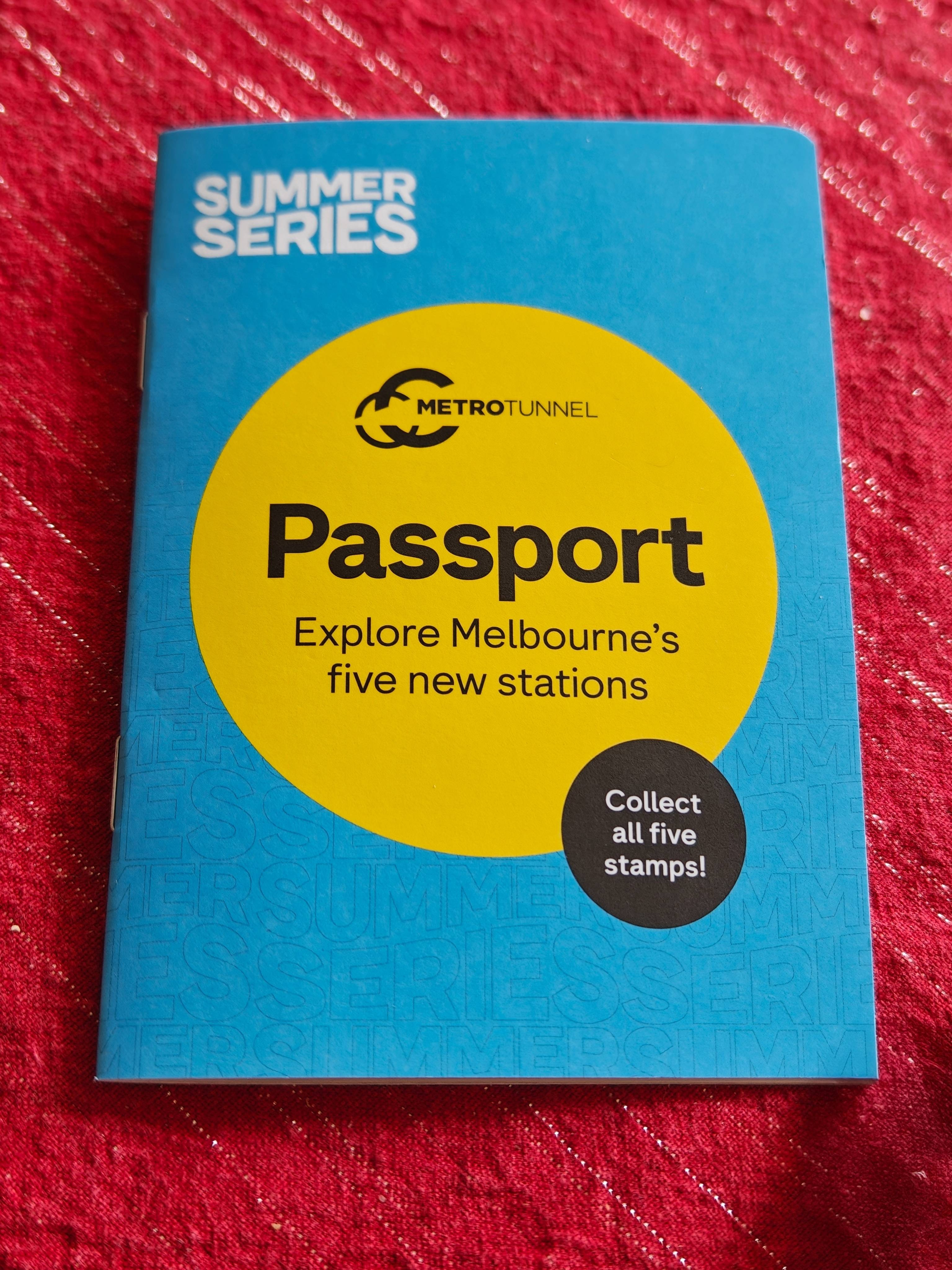
Summer Series: Passport

The Summer Series was a seasonal program organised by Victoria's Big Build (Metro Tunnel) to coincide with the early operation of the Metro Tunnel. It featured a range of activities intended to encourage ridership of the line and its five new stations, including performances, interactive experiences, surprise treats and other events. As part of the series, the Passport Challenge invited participants to collect a limited-edition passport from Metro Tunnel HQ or any of the five new stations from 12 to 29 January, and obtain stamps at each station to win a set of Metro Tunnel pins. The Summer Series activities ran during January and were promoted as opportunities for families and commuters to ride the new tunnel.

=== Metro Tunnel Pins ===
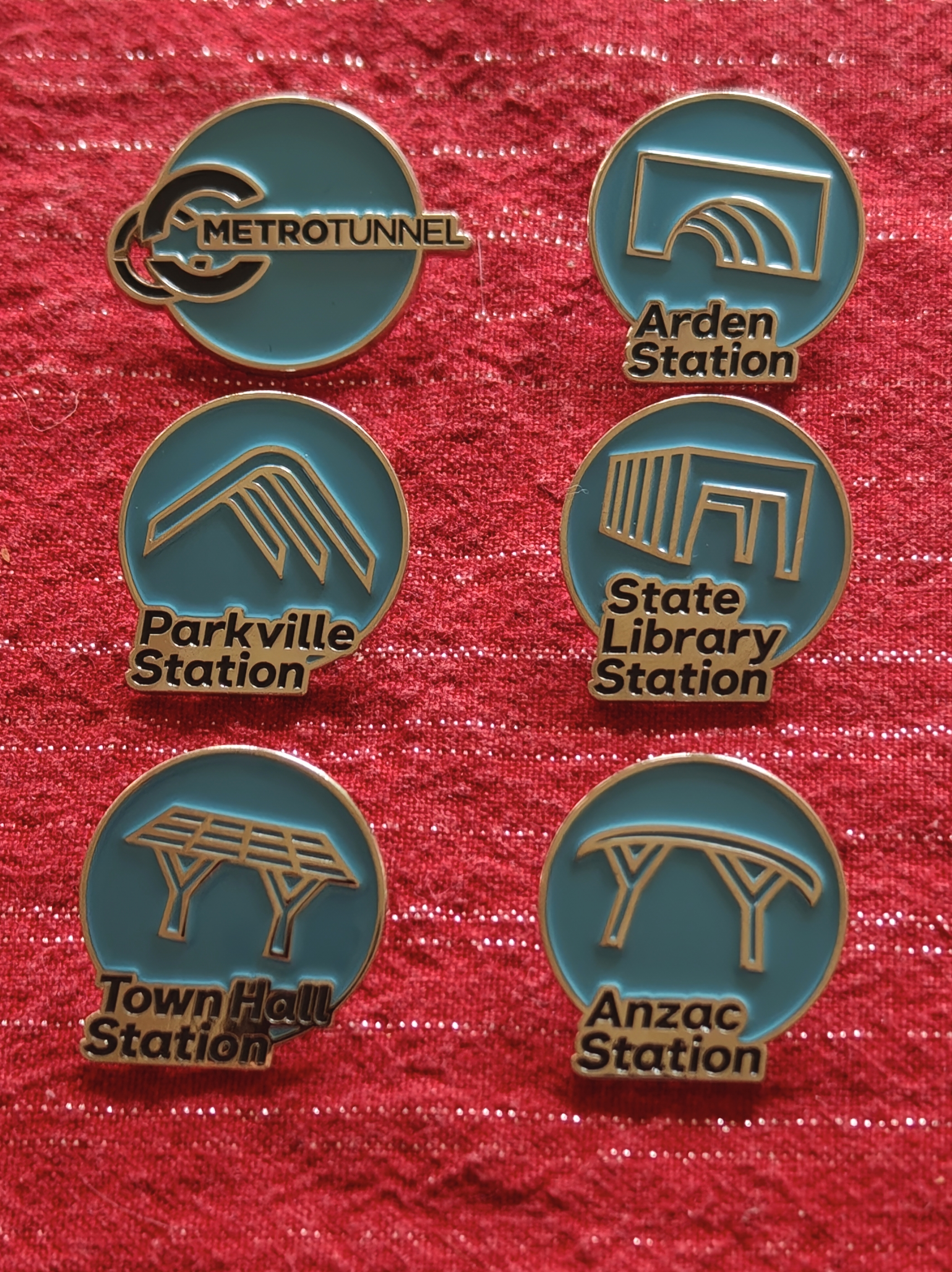
Promotional Metro Tunnel Pins

Metro Tunnel Pins were available for the Summer Series, and Metro Tunnel opening.

== Analysis and criticism ==
=== Network capacity ===
The primary stated aim of the project is to increase capacity within the inner core of the metropolitan network, as well as improving reliability and efficiency. It aims to accomplish this by creating a single, end-to-end metropolitan line between Sunbury in the west and Dandenong in the south-east, linking the existing Sunbury, Cranbourne and Pakenham lines and providing them with a dedicated city centre route. Because this re-routing removes services from the Northern Loop, more capacity will theoretically be available for the Werribee, Williamstown, Craigieburn, Upfield, Frankston and Sandringham lines. According to official project estimates, the result is a total capacity increase of 39,000 passengers in the city centre for each peak period.

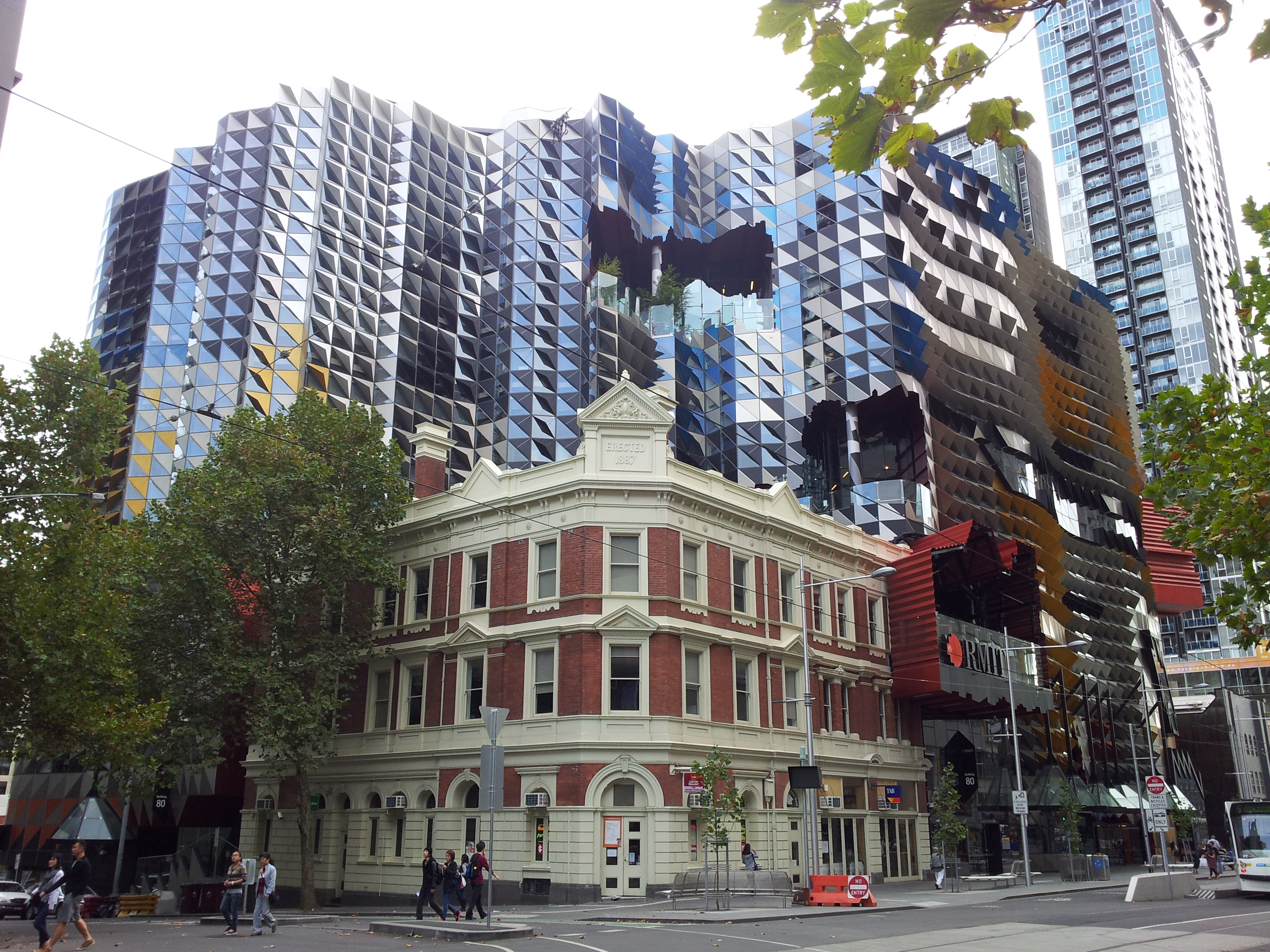
Building 80 at RMIT University, near the new State Library station entrance (not shown in picture)

However, the need for a new tunnel to increase capacity has been subject to criticism that capacity on the existing network is under utilised or hamstrung by operational inefficiencies, since the project was originally proposed in Eddington's report. Paul Mees in 2008 noted that the claim the new tunnel would allow 40 extra trains per hour through the city should be compared to an increase of 56 trains per hour by increasing line capacity to 24 trains per hour per line (80% of the theoretical 30 trains per hour allowed by the current signalling system), reducing dwell times and other efficiencies such as terminating some trains at Flinders Street station rather than Southern Cross station. Mees also criticised the proposal for absorbing rail investment at the expense of extending the network at its periphery.

On the other hand, transport economist Chris Hale has argued that while the capacity increase offered by the tunnel is real and probably more significant than that offered by incremental upgrades to the existing network, the project is the product of poor planning processes in the Victorian transport bureaucracy and consequently reflects a "single-issue" approach to infrastructure which is inconsistent with contemporary best practice. Hale contends that the tunnel's route, which reinforces existing transport networks and focuses on the inner city as the single connection point of all transport, exemplifies outmoded thinking and, therefore, achieves its primary aims while failing to accomplish more extensive benefits for a similar cost.

Ultimately, the business case for the Metro Tunnel considered high-capacity signalling and other network upgrades as alternatives to the proposed route. It concluded that, when compared to the tunnel, upgrading to HCS would produce inferior outcomes because of its limited capacity benefits and its failure to integrate improvement of the existing network with service to new parts of the central city. Additionally, the business case noted that by making incremental upgrades to the rail system without substantially altering its structure, the opportunity for more reliable operations as a result of fully segregated lines would be lost.

=== Swanston Street tram services ===
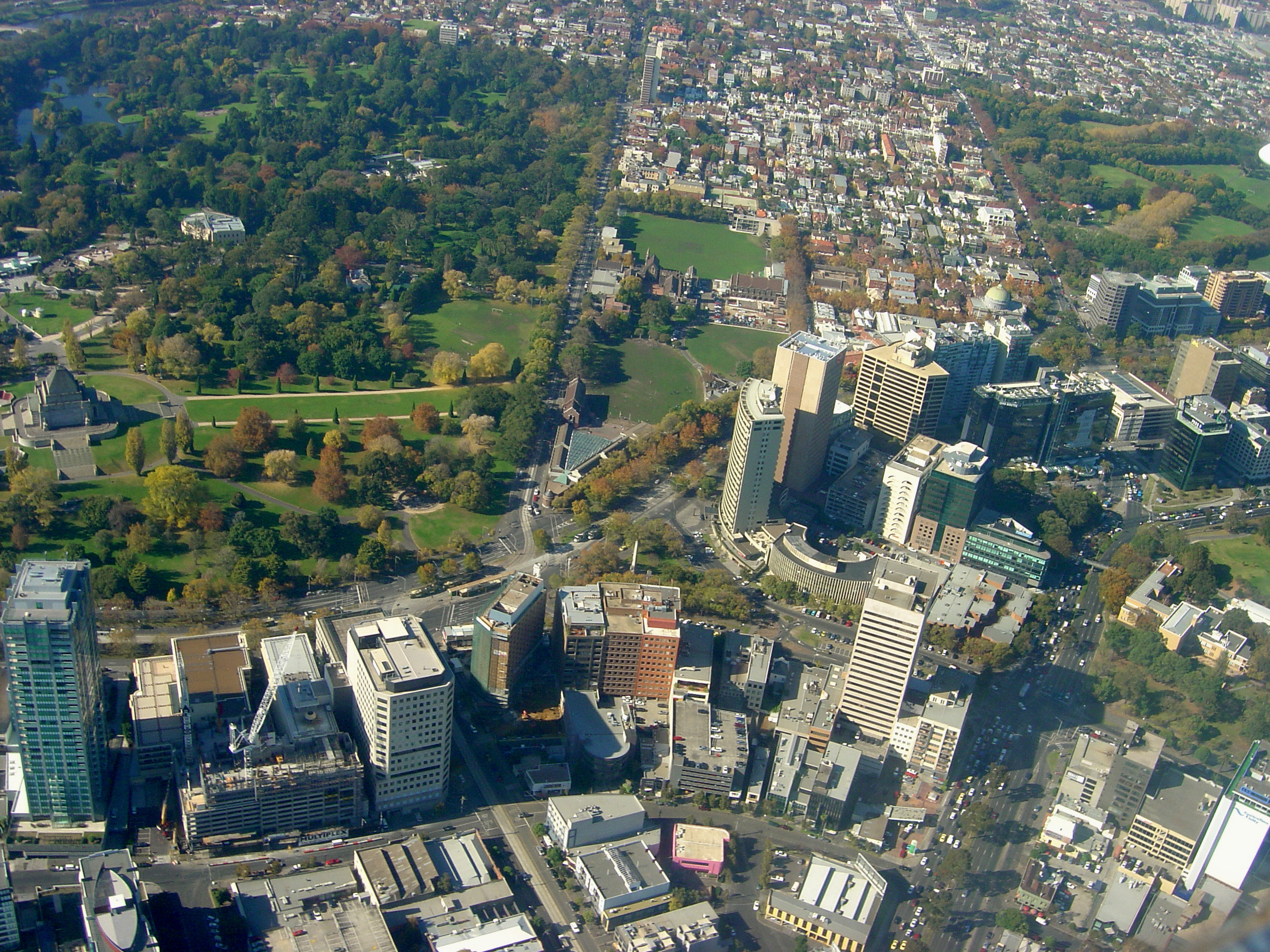
Domain Interchange, 2004, site of the now completed Anzac station

With the proposed route expected to run directly under Swanston Street and towards the south-eastern suburbs, the project will provide much needed relief to existing and overcrowded tram services that run from St Kilda Road into the CBD. Currently, St Kilda Road is the busiest tram thoroughfare in the world, with up to 10 tram routes running into the CBD via Swanston Street. The Metro Tunnel is expected to relieve this pressure by allowing commuters to catch the train into the Domain Interchange and CBD from either the north-west or south-eastern suburbs, avoiding already congested tram routes. In particular, many of the existing tram routes that run through St Kilda Road terminate at Melbourne University, which will be more easily accessible from the nearby Parkville station when the Melbourne Metro is complete.

Concerns existed over expected disruption along the Swanston Street corridor, with former Premier Denis Napthine controversially describing the alignment of the tunnel as akin to the Berlin Wall, which would "tear the city in half for up to two years". However, changes to engineering and construction plans allowed for tunneling, rather than the 'cut and cover' method of construction, resulting in minimal disruption for trams, pedestrians and traders along Swanston Street during construction.

=== Further network expansion ===
In 2012, Public Transport Victoria, the body charged with planning and coordination of public transport services in Victoria, released the Metropolitan Network Development Plan. It emphasised the need for the project as a precursor for other heavy rail expansion projects, given current limitations on existing inner city infrastructure to cope with additional services running into the inner part of the network. In particular rail lines to Doncaster, Melbourne Airport and Rowville require additional inner core capacity to enable services to run on those lines into the CBD.

=== Jobs ===
The project was expected to employ up to 3,500 people during peak construction. The training program called MetroHub provides all training, recruitment and project inductions for people working on the Tunnel and Stations work package. 500 apprentices, trainees and engineering cadets were expected to be a part of this program.

=== South Yarra station ===
The project ruled out integration with major south-eastern hub South Yarra station, meaning it will be bypassed by trains using the new tunnel. Passengers from the city on the tunnel's Dandenong line will not be able to transfer to the Sandringham line at South Yarra, and passengers travelling towards the city on the Dandenong line will be required to change at Caulfield to pursue travel to South Yarra. Pressure from the State Opposition and the Greens to include the station in the tunnel's design went unheeded. The Melbourne Metro Rail Authority has defended the plan, saying the economic case for integration is poor, requiring the building of a new hub and the acquisition of 114 properties including part of The Jam Factory at a cost of an extra $1 billion; a business case estimate indicates a return of only 20c for every dollar spent on the station. Integration of South Yarra station into the project has been the subject of lobbying as a requirement for federal funding.

=== Cost and funding ===
A significant point of contention has been the relative cost of the project and the capacity of the State to afford up to $11 billion. The former Abbott Federal Government had specifically ruled out funding urban rail projects across the country, limiting funding options for the Melbourne Metro project and placed pressure on the State Government to fund the project with a mix of debt and private business investment. While funding allocated by the Abbott Government for the scrapped East West Link was specifically ruled out for use on urban rail projects in Melbourne, the former Turnbull government had removed this condition.

Federal funding options for the project were realised by the former Abbott Government's 'Asset Recycling Program', which matches 15% of the cost of any State Government asset that is sold to be used for infrastructure projects. The sale of the Port of Melbourne by the Andrews Government could provide additional funding to the Melbourne Metro project once sold, including an indirect contribution by the Federal Government.

In June 2024, a report by the Victorian Auditor-General's Office revealed that the project was facing cost overruns of over $1.9 billion, raising the original total estimated expenditure from $10.9 billion to $12.8 billion. Delays meant the contracted opening date of September 2024 would not be met. The report attributed the cost increase and delays to several factors, including cost escalation on the tunnelling and at the CBD stations, staffing shortages, supply chain issues, and systems integration issues. Media reported that the total cost was likely to be $14 billion.

Initiatives to mitigate electromagnetic interference from the tunnels with medical equipment at nearby sites, such as the Royal Melbourne Hospital and the Peter MacCallum Cancer Centre, had also increased costs. The report identified solutions that were being trialled and implemented related to this medical equipment but said risks remained that could affect the project's timeline and budget. The Age reported on challenges at the CBD stations, particularly State Library and Town Hall, which have led to construction delays. The newspaper also reported that further compensation payments could be required to the City of Melbourne and tenants, such as the Westin hotel at City Square.

== See also ==
- Melbourne Metro 2 – proposed successor project
- Cross River Rail – similar project under construction in Brisbane
- Sydney Metro City & Southwest – similar project in Sydney
- City Rail Link – similar project in Auckland
- Suburban Rail Loop – under construction orbital rail line in Melbourne
