= Transport in Melbourne =

PTV public transport symbols, from left to right: metropolitan train, tram, bus, regional train, coach, ferry, and SkyBus.

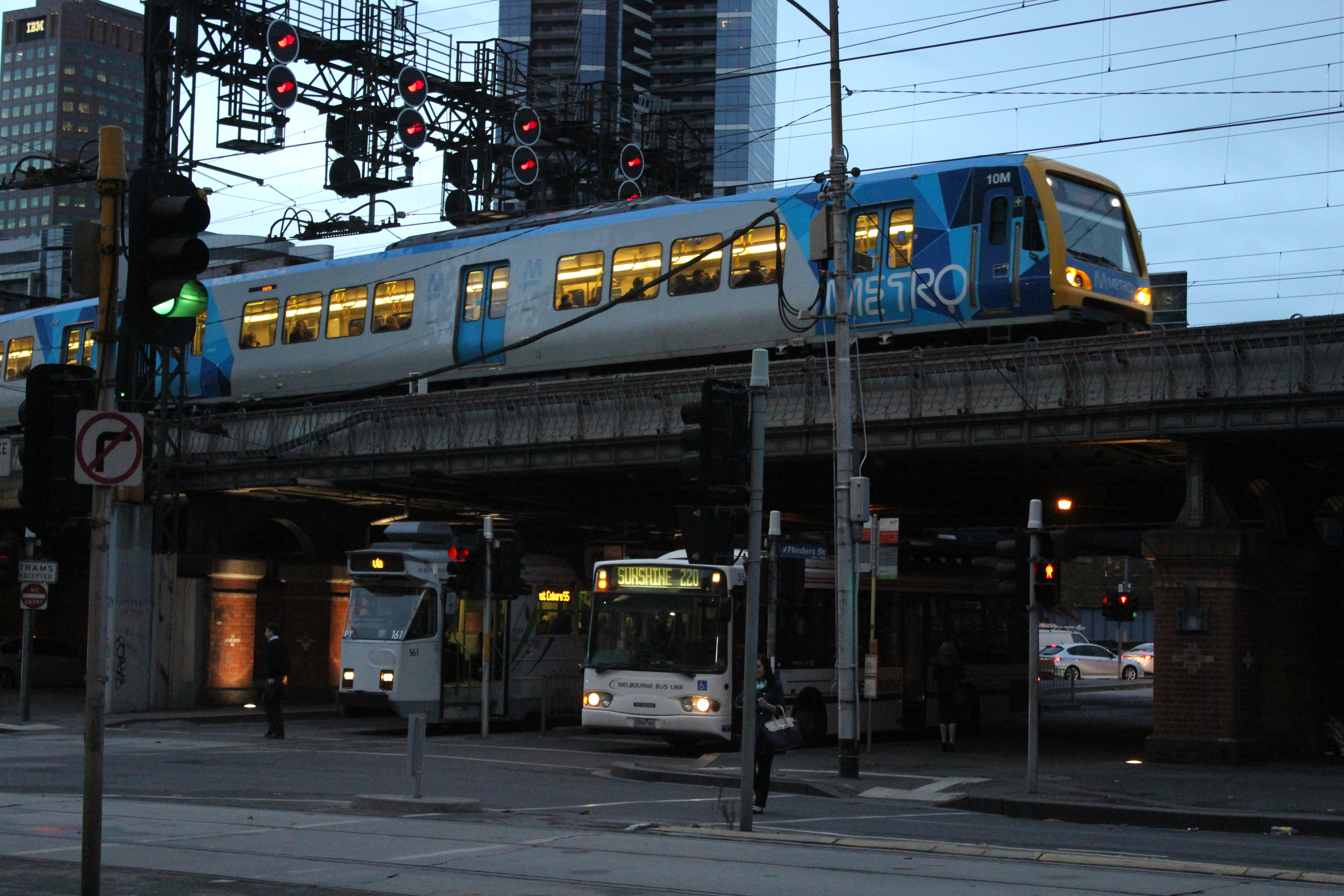
Yarra Trams Z-class tram beside a Melbourne Bus Link Scania bus, with a Metro Trains X'Trapolis 100 passing above

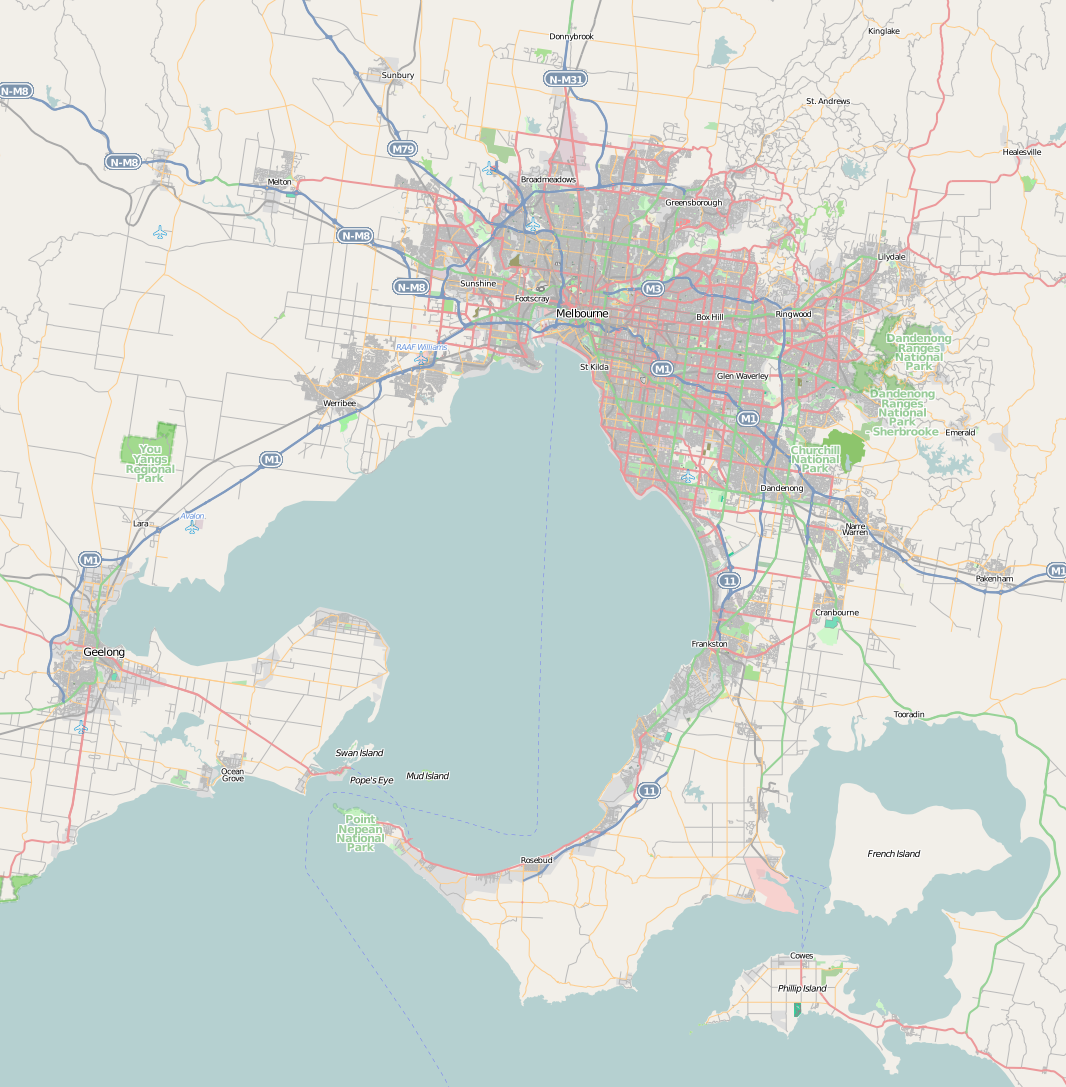
Road map of the Melbourne metropolitan area by OpenStreetMap

Transport in Melbourne, the state capital of Victoria, Australia, consists of several interlinking modes. Melbourne is a hub for intercity, intracity and regional travel. Road-based transport accounts for most trips across many parts of the city, facilitated by Australia's largest freeway network. Public transport, including the world's largest tram network, trains and buses, also forms a key part of the transport system. Other dominant modes include walking, cycling and commercial-passenger vehicle services such as taxis.

Melbourne is a busy regional transport hub for the statewide passenger rail network, coaches and interstate rail services to New South Wales and South Australia. Freight transport also makes up a significant proportion of trips made on the network from the Port of Melbourne, Melbourne Airport and industrial areas across the city.

According to the 2016 Australian census, Melbourne has the second-highest rate of public transport usage among Australian capital cities for travel to work at 19 percent, second to Sydney's 27 percent. In 2017–2018, 565 million passenger trips were made on Melbourne's metropolitan public transport network.

Melbourne has the most road space per capita of any Australian city, with its freeway network being comparable to Los Angeles and Atlanta in terms of its size and scale. Much of Australia's automotive industry was located in Melbourne until all manufacturing ceased at the end of 2017. The state government, as part of the release of the Melbourne 2030 planning strategy in 2002, set a target for modal share of cars to decrease to 80 percent by 2020. However, increases in car usage since this target was set has not shown the decline that was initially predicted.

== Timeline ==
=== General ===
- 1837: The Hoddle Grid, Melbourne's first street system, is laid out.
- 1844: Princes Bridge on St Kilda Road, a toll bridge and the first over the Yarra River, opens.
- 1849: Melbourne's main streets are paved.
- 1850: Tolls are removed from Princes Bridge.
- 1854: Flinders Street railway station and the first rail line to Sandridge (Port Melbourne) open.
- 1858: The Spencer Street station is built, connecting Melbourne to the rest of Victoria.
- 1885: First cable tram to Hawthorn
- 1889: First electric tram between Doncaster and Box Hill
- 1890: Doncaster railway line first proposed.
- 1891: Flinders Street Viaduct opens as a single, then double track link between Flinders Street and Spencer Street stations.
- 1910: Present Flinders Street station opens as the main suburban railway terminus.
- 1919: Electrification of the suburban rail network commences, continuing to this day
- 1920s: Flinders Street station declared the world's busiest station several times.
- 1940: The Ashworth Improvement Plan details proposed improvements to suburban rail in the inner city.
- 1966: St Kilda Junction remodelled and Queens Way underpass created for new highways at Dandenong Road and Punt Road.
- 1969: Melbourne Transportation Plan released planning numerous freeways and railways.
- 1970: The West Gate Bridge collapses, and the Melbourne Underground Rail Loop Authority is established.
- 1971: The Melbourne Underground Rail Loop project begins.
- 1977: First section of Eastern Freeway opens, with land reserved for a Doncaster railway line. The $202 million toll West Gate Bridge opens. Hoddle Highway is created from a four-lane widening of Hoddle Street and the demolition of buildings on the east side of Hoddle Street.
- 1980: The Lonie Report recommends replacing half the tram system with buses, as well as several railway lines in Melbourne and Victoria to be closed, but no tram routes were closed, and only 2 rail lines were closed to be replaced by trams.
- 1981: First stage of the Melbourne Underground Rail Loop opens.
- 1982: A transport bill is introduced in the Victorian Parliament.
- 1983: Transport Act 1983 receives royal assent on 23 June and becomes effective on 1 July. The act creates the State Transport Authority, the Metropolitan Transit Authority, the Road Construction Authority and the Road Traffic Authority. Victorian Railways, the Melbourne & Metropolitan Tramways Board and the Country Roads Board are abolished.
- 1985: Tolls removed from the West Gate Bridge.
- 1987: St Kilda and Port Melbourne railway lines replaced by trams.
- 1989: Construction of the $631 million Western Ring Road begins. The Public Transport Corporation and VicRoads replace the State Transport Authority, Metropolitan Transit Authority, Road Construction Authority and Road Traffic Authority on 1 July.
- 1992: A new government is elected in October under Premier Jeff Kennett. Alan Brown is appointed Minister for Public Transport and Bill Baxter Minister for Roads and Ports. The Ministry of Transport is replaced by the Department of Transport, and transport administration functions are transferred from the Public Transport Corporation to the secretary of the Department of Transport.
- 1994: Free City Circle Tram begins.
- 1995: The Dandenong to Cranbourne rail electrification opens, reinstating passenger service after several years, and the Public Transport Competition Act is passed by Parliament.
- 1996: Construction of the $2 billion CityLink tollway begins, and the Rail Corporations Act is passed by Parliament.
- 1997: Design of the franchising of the public transport network begins.
- 1998: Legislation establishes the Director of Public Transport to manage public transport service and VicTrack, to own public-transport land and assets.
- 1999: The Western Ring Road and the Bolte Bridge, the second major road over the Yarra River, open. The state government commissions the Linking Victoria study. The Director of Public Transport, VicTrack and the franchising of services begin.
- 2002: Transport Minister Peter Batchelor announces that the airport rail link to Tullamarine would not viable for another 10 years, and commits to upgrading SkyBus service to the airport. The state government commissions a Melbourne 2030 planning report, aimed at addressing population growth of up to a million new residents. With recommendations for transport, including the expansion of major activity centres (such as Dandenong and Camberwell) with access to public transport and tripling of the Dandenong line, the document aimed for 20% of trips in Melbourne to be made by public transport by 2020.
- 2003: The $23 million Box Hill tram-light rail extension opens.
- 2004: The Linking Melbourne: Metropolitan Transport Plan summarised findings of the Inner West Integrated Transport Study, North East Integrated Transport Study, Outer Western Suburbs Transport Strategy, Whittlesea Strategic Transport Infrastructure Study and Northern Central City Corridor Strategy, recommending $1.5 billion in investment. The Southern Cross Station redevelopment (which ran late and over budget), Docklands light-rail extension and the Regional Fast Train system were planned for the Commonwealth Games. The $30.5 million Vermont South tram extension begins.

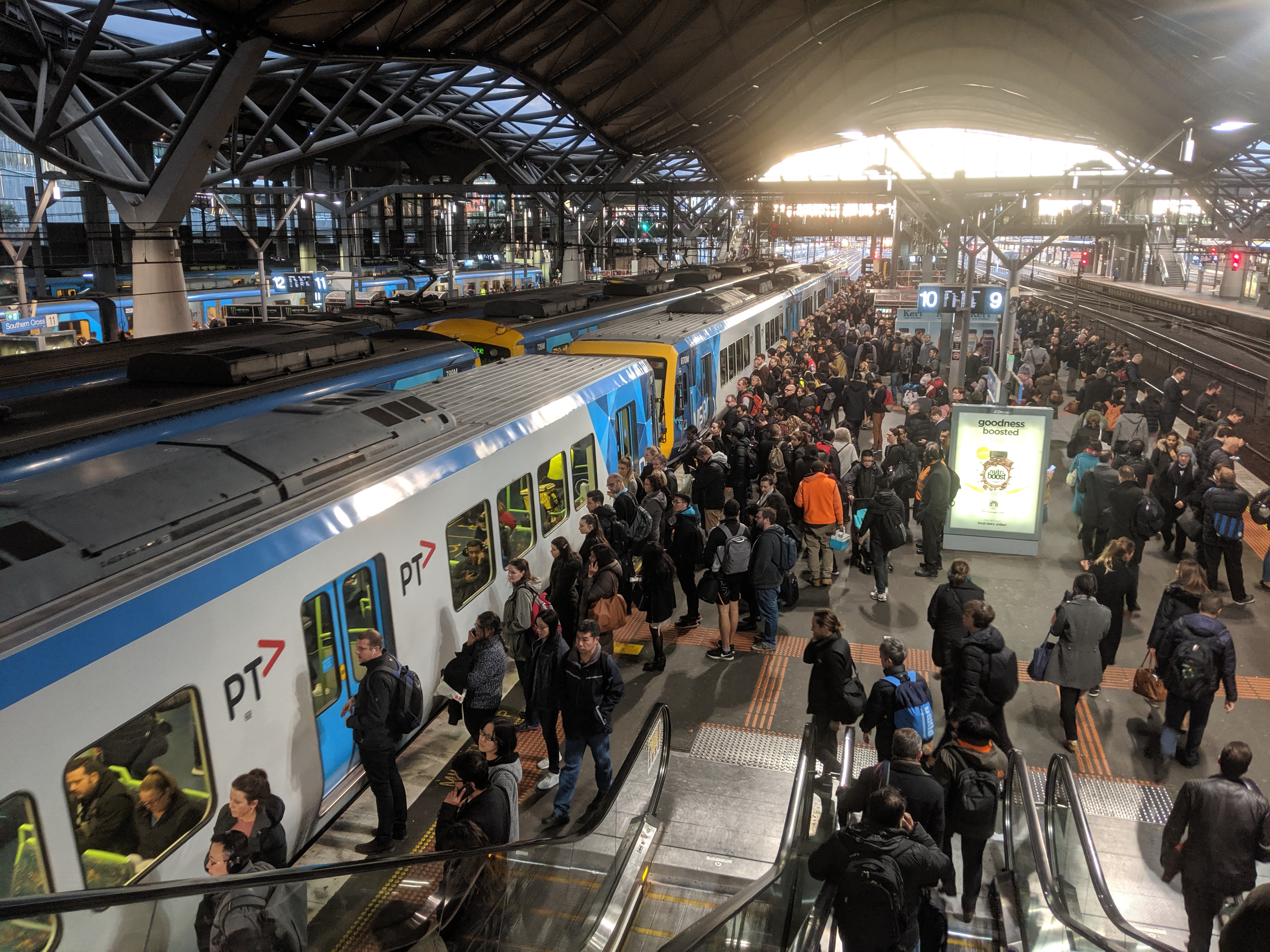
Southern Cross Station

- 2005: The $2.5 billion EastLink Freeway project begins.
- 2006: The state government releases Meeting our Transport Challenges, a $10 billion plan to improve public transport and roads. It includes a "Think Tram" project to reduce tram travel times and recommendations for a (delayed) SmartBus system for the eastern suburbs. The Rail Safety Act, Victoria's first rail-safety statute, becomes effective on 1 August. New transport-ticketing regulations begin. The state's first independent rail and bus safety regulator and rail, bus and marine safety investigator begin on 1 August.
- 2007: Myki, a new public-transport ticketing system which was delayed and over budget, is scheduled to be introduced. The state government commissions an east–west transport plan. Public-transport ticketing zone 3 is abolished. An accreditation scheme for taxi, bus and other commercial passenger-vehicle drivers and for taxi-industry licence-holders, operators and network-service providers begins on 1 July. Australia's first "Copenhagen style" cycleways are implemented in Swanston Street, Carlton; Tim Pallas rejects a Melbourne City Council plan for a Copenhagen-style cycleway on St Kilda Road. The Accident Towing Services Act is passed by Parliament.
- 2008: The Port Phillip Channel Deepening Project, a dredging project to deepen Melbourne's shipping channels, begins. The $18 billion Eddington Transport Report, aimed at reducing traffic congestion, focuses on East–West routes and includes a controversial 18-kilometre road tunnel and 17-kilometre rail tunnel and a new rail line from Werribee to Deer Park, Victoria but does not address greenhouse emissions. Eastlink opens, and the Monash–CityLink–West Gate freeway upgrade begins. The Department of Transport (Victoria, 2008–13) replaces the Department of Infrastructure. The Australian Greens Victoria transport plan is released. Public Transport Minister Lynne Kosky postpones an airport link 20 years. The Victorian Transport Plan, the state government's fourth "long-term" transport statement since 2002, is released. New Melbourne Lord Mayor Robert Doyle proposes returning vehicle traffic to Swanston Street.
- 2009: The Accident Towing Services Act mandates new standards for tow-truck operations (including licence holders and drivers) on 1 January. The Transport Integration Bill (later the Transport Integration Act) is introduced in the Victorian Parliament on 10 December. Myki is introduced in late December on suburban trains. The Major Transport Projects Facilitation Act 2009, speeding planning consents and delivery of rail, road and port projects, is passed by Parliament and begins on 1 September. Metro Trains Melbourne took over metropolitan rail operations from Connex Melbourne on 30 November 2009.
- 2010: A Fair Fines package begins on 1 February as part of Transport (Infringements) Regulations 2010, with infringement penalties for minors reduced by two-thirds and a graduated-penalties programme eliminated. The Transport Integration Act is passed by the Victorian Parliament in February, and becomes law on 1 July. Melbourne Bike Share, a public bicycle-hire service, is planned for mid-year. The Transport Act 1983 is renamed the Transport (Compliance and Miscellaneous) Act 1983 on 1 July. Public-transport and marine-safety regulators merge to create the Director, Transport Safety on 1 July after the merger of Director, Public Transport Safety (Public Transport Safety Victoria) and Director, Marine Safety (Marine Safety Victoria). The Victorian Regional Channels Authority and the Port of Hastings Corporation are merged with the Port of Melbourne Corporation on 1 September. The new state government, elected on 27 November under Premier Ted Baillieu with Terry Mulder as Minister for Public Transport and Minister for Roads, Denis Napthine as Minister for Ports and Edward O'Donoghue as Parliamentary Secretary for Transport, promises to create the Victorian Public Transport Development Authority to plan and manage public transport in Victoria and Melbourne. The Tourist and Heritage Railways Act and the Marine Safety Act 2010 are passed by the Victorian Parliament. The Bus Safety Act begins on 31 December.
- 2011: Terry Mulder announces the government's intention in March to hold a Taxi Industry Inquiry, which begins in late May headed by Allan Fels. The Transport Legislation Amendment (Taxi Services Reform and Other Matters) Act 2011 passes the Victorian Parliament on 29 June, empowering the Taxi Industry Inquiry and creating the Taxi Services Commission (which begins operations on 19 July). The Transport Legislation Amendment (Port of Hastings Development Authority) Act 2011 passes the Victorian Parliament on 16 August, creating the Port of Hastings Development Authority. The Tourist and Heritage Railways Act and the Tourist and Heritage Railways Regulations 2011 become effective on 1 October. the Transport Legislation Amendment (Public Transport Development Authority) Act 2011 passes the Victorian Parliament on 27 October, empowering Public Transport Victoria (which begins operations on 15 December). The Port Management Amendment (Port of Melbourne Licence Fee) Bill 2011, introduced in the Victorian Parliament in early December, proposes a $75 million annual fee to be paid by the Port of Melbourne Corporation to the Victorian government.
- 2012: The Port of Hastings Development Authority begins operations on 1 January, reversing the merger of the former Port of Hastings Corporation and the Port of Melbourne Corporation. The Public Transport Development Authority (now known as Public Transport Victoria) takes over train, tram and bus service in Victoria on 2 April, in accordance with the Transport Legislation Amendment (Public Transport Development Authority) Act 2011. The extension of the Epping railway line to South Morang is completed in April. The Port of Melbourne Corporation becomes liable on 1 July for a $75 million licence fee to the government, in accordance with the Port Management Amendment (Port of Melbourne Licence Fee) Act 2012. The Marine Safety Act 2010 begins on 1 July, setting new standards for commercial and recreational vessels; the Marine Act 1988 is repealed. Strict drug controls (for anyone in charge of a vessel) and zero blood-alcohol controls introduced for commercial vessel operators are introduced by the Transport Legislation Amendment (Drug and Alcohol Controls and Other Matters) Act 2012 on 1 December. The federal government approves plans for Avalon Airport to become Melbourne's second international airport. The Metcard ticketing system ends in December, leaving Myki Melbourne's sole public-transport ticketing system. Laws are enacted late in the year to support the opening and operation of the Peninsula Link freeway. The PTV Network Development Plan for Metropolitan Rail was introduced in December 2012, which outlines what the government's plans for the future of rail in Melbourne would be.
- 2013: The Peninsula Link freeway opens in January. A$78 million "handover area" building project begins at train stations. The Director of Public Transport and the Transport Ticketing Authority are abolished on 1 July, and their functions become part of Public Transport Victoria. The Taxi Services Commission becomes the state's taxi and hire-car regulator on 1 July, replacing the Victorian Taxi Directorate (which was abolished).
- 2015: The Department of Economic Development, Jobs, Transport and Resources (DEDJTR) replaces the Department of Transport, Planning and Local Infrastructure as the department responsible for transport policy. The Level Crossing Removal Project (LXRP) was founded in May 2015 to remove 50 dangerous level crossing across Melbourne.
- 2015: The Regional Rail Link opens in June, separating regional Ballarat, Bendigo and Geelong service from the Werribee Line. Two new stations are built, at Tarneit and Wyndham Vale. Site investigations commence for the Metro Tunnel.
- 2016: 8 level crossings were removed by the LXRP. In February 2016 the business case for the Metro Tunnel is released to the public.
- 2016: In June 2016 contracts are awarded for early works on the Metro Tunnel
- 2016: In December 2016 Environmental Impact Statements were published
- 2017: Contracts awarded for the tunnel and stations construction as well as rail system upgrades in preparation for the Metro Tunnel
- 2017: A further 3 level crossings were removed by the LXRP.
- 2017: City Square in the Melbourne CBD is closed off as work commences on the construction of Town Hall Station.
  - 2017: Toorak Road trams are connected to St Kilda Rd for construction of Anzac Station.
- 2017: Transport for Victoria is formed within DEDJTR by an amendment to the Transport Integration Act, to plan and coordinate the transport network as a statutory body on behalf of the Department of Transport.
- 2018: The federal and state governments announced that they would be funding a connection to the airport as part of the existing rail network.
- 2018: The state government announces plans for the Suburban Rail Loop, a new heavy rail line to connect existing train corridors in non-CBD locations to facilitate cross-suburban travel.
- 2018: Contract awarded for rail infrastructure connections and upgrades in preparation for the Metro Tunnel.
- 2018: 28 more level crossings were removed by the LXRP
- 2018: Mernda Rail Extension is complete, with 8km of new twin pairs of track and 3 new stations at Mernda, Hawkstowe and Middle Gorge.
- 2019: The Department of Transport is separated from DEDJTR as the department responsible for transport policy.
- 2019: 2 level crossings were removed by the LXRP.
- 2020: 12 more level crossings were removed by the LXRP.
- 2021: Victoria's Bus Plan was released by the Department of Transport.
- 2021: 13 level crossings were removed by the LXRP.
- 2021: The LXRP announces a further 10 level crossings to be removed by 2025.
- 2022: 11 more level crossings were removed by the LXRP
- 2022: In February 2024, 8km of track duplication between Dandenong and Cranbourne is complete.
- 2023: A further 7 crossings are removed by the LXRP
- 2024: In November 2024, Victoria's Zero-Emission Bus Transition Plan was released, outlining how the state's public buses will transition to a 100% zero-emissions fleet.
- 2024: 10 more crossings are removed by the LXRP.

=== Metro Tunnel ===
- April 2015 – Site investigations begin
- February 2016 – Metro Tunnel Business Case released
- June 2016 – Contract awarded for early works
- December 2016 – Environment Effects Statement process finishes
- April 2017 – City Square closed as work begins on Town Hall Station
- July 2017 – Contracts awarded for tunnel and stations construction and rail system upgrades
- July 2017 – Toorak Road trams connected to St Kilda Road for construction of Anzac Station
- September 2017 – Demolition and archaeology digs in the CBD begin
- October 2017 – Construction of the first acoustic shed begins (at Franklin Street)
- July 2018 – Contract awarded for rail infrastructure connections and upgrades
- February 2018 – Grattan Street closed for construction of Parkville Station
- August 2018 - Piling works at City Square begin
- December 2018 - Federation Square Visitor Centre demolished
- August 2019 – First tunnel boring machine (TBM) launches at the Arden Station site
- February 2020 – First TBM breakthrough completes a section of tunnel from Arden to Kensington
- July 2020 – New platform at West Footscray Station open
- May 2021 – All TBM tunnelling complete
- February 2022 – Track installation begins
- March 2022 – Sunshine Signal Control Centre completed
- December 2022 – New Anzac Station tram stop open
- March 2023 – Track installation completed with the Metro Tunnel connected to the Sunbury, Cranbourne and Pakenham lines
- June 2023 – First test trains enter the Metro Tunnel
- October 2023 – High Capacity Signalling introduced on sections of the Cranbourne and Pakenham line
- October 2023– High Capacity Metro Train begin running on the Sunbury Line
- January 2024 – Arden Station complete
- May 2024 – Parkville Station complete
- September 2024 – Anzac Station complete
- September 2024 - Testing begins with multiple trains in the tunnel
- January 2025 - Trial operations begin including station staff training
- April 2025 - Metro Trains Melbourne staff move into Arden, Anzac and Parkville stations

== Public transport ==
Melbourne's public transport system includes train, tram, bus and ferry services. Its tram network is the largest in the world. Almost 300 bus routes and 16 rail lines serve Greater Melbourne.

Since World War II Melbourne has become a dispersed, car-oriented city, leading to a decline in public transport use. The original transport patterns of urban development are still reflected Melbourne's prewar areas. The operation of Melbourne's public transport system was privatised by the government in 1999. Under this arrangement, rail and tram operations are contracted to private companies while the infrastructure remained under government control. Several operators have been awarded contracts since its commencement, including Connex Melbourne, M>Train and Keolis Downer. Despite initial plans that government subsidies would decrease to zero by 2015, payments to private companies have instead increased significantly.

Since the mid-2000s patronage has grown steadily on Melbourne's public transport system, particularly the metropolitan train and tram networks, leading to significant investment in the system and a number of major infrastructure projects. According to the 2018 Victorian Integrated Survey of Travel & Activity, Melbourne's public transport accounted for 8.5% of all trips within Greater Melbourne and Geelong, with 19% of journeys to work within Melbourne occurring on public transport across the three main modes.

=== Metropolitan train ===
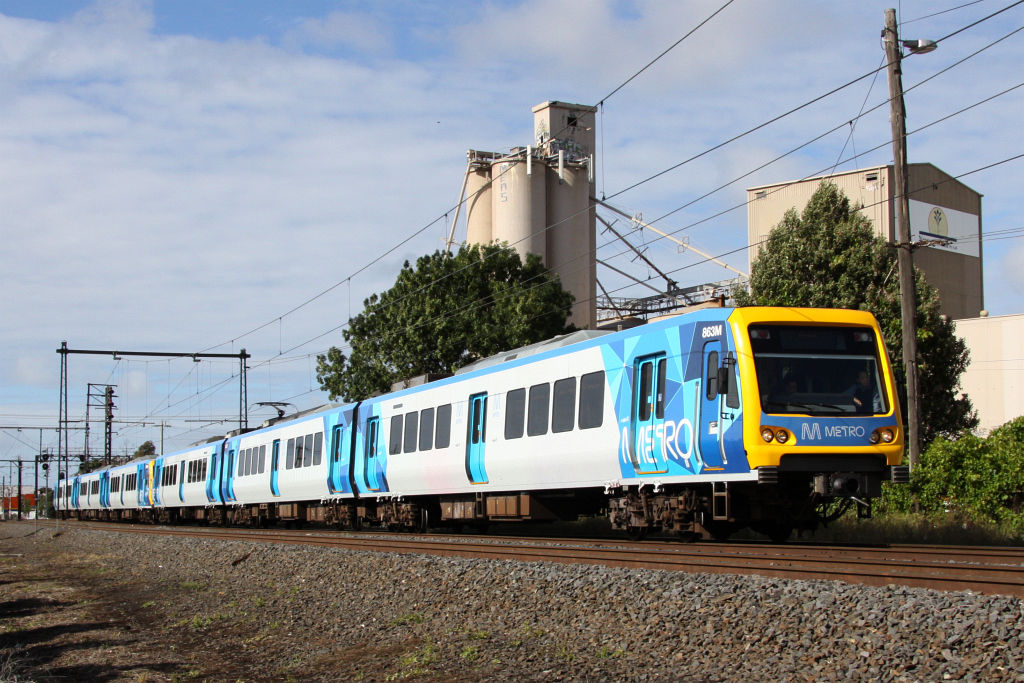
X'Trapolis 100 train, operated by Metro Trains Melbourne

Melbourne has a 16 line urban heavy rail network operated by Metro Trains Melbourne and serviced by a fleet of 326 EMU trains. With the exception of the Stony Point line, the entire urban rail network is electrified. The metropolitan network is considered to be a hybrid commuter and rapid transit system, serving both the inner city and outer commuter suburbs with high frequencies in peak periods but lower frequencies at other times. Flinders Street railway station is the city's main metropolitan station while Southern Cross railway station is the main interchange station for regional and interstate railway services.

=== Tram ===
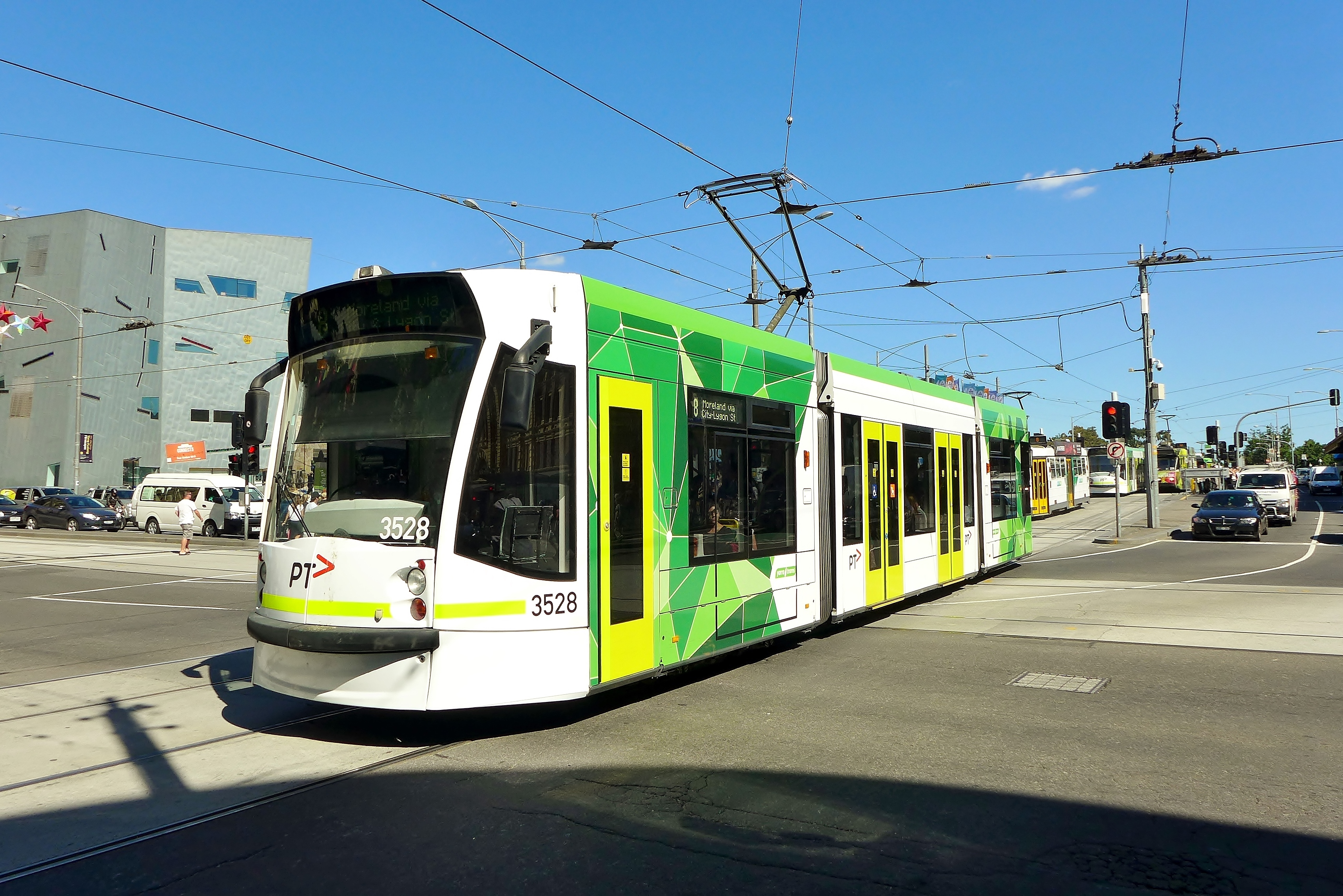
D1-class tram operated by Yarra Trams

Melbourne has the world's largest tram network, consisting of 250 kilometres (160 mi) of double track, nearly 500 trams on 24 routes, and 1,763 tram stops. It is operated by Yarra Trams. Two partial light rail routes are also part of the network. Most of the remaining track is mixed with vehicle traffic, which makes it one of the slowest tram networks in the world. Trams operate mostly in the inner suburbs and generally provide for short to medium-length trips. Trams are free to ride within the central business district. Heritage trams operate on the free City Circle route around the CBD.

=== Bus ===
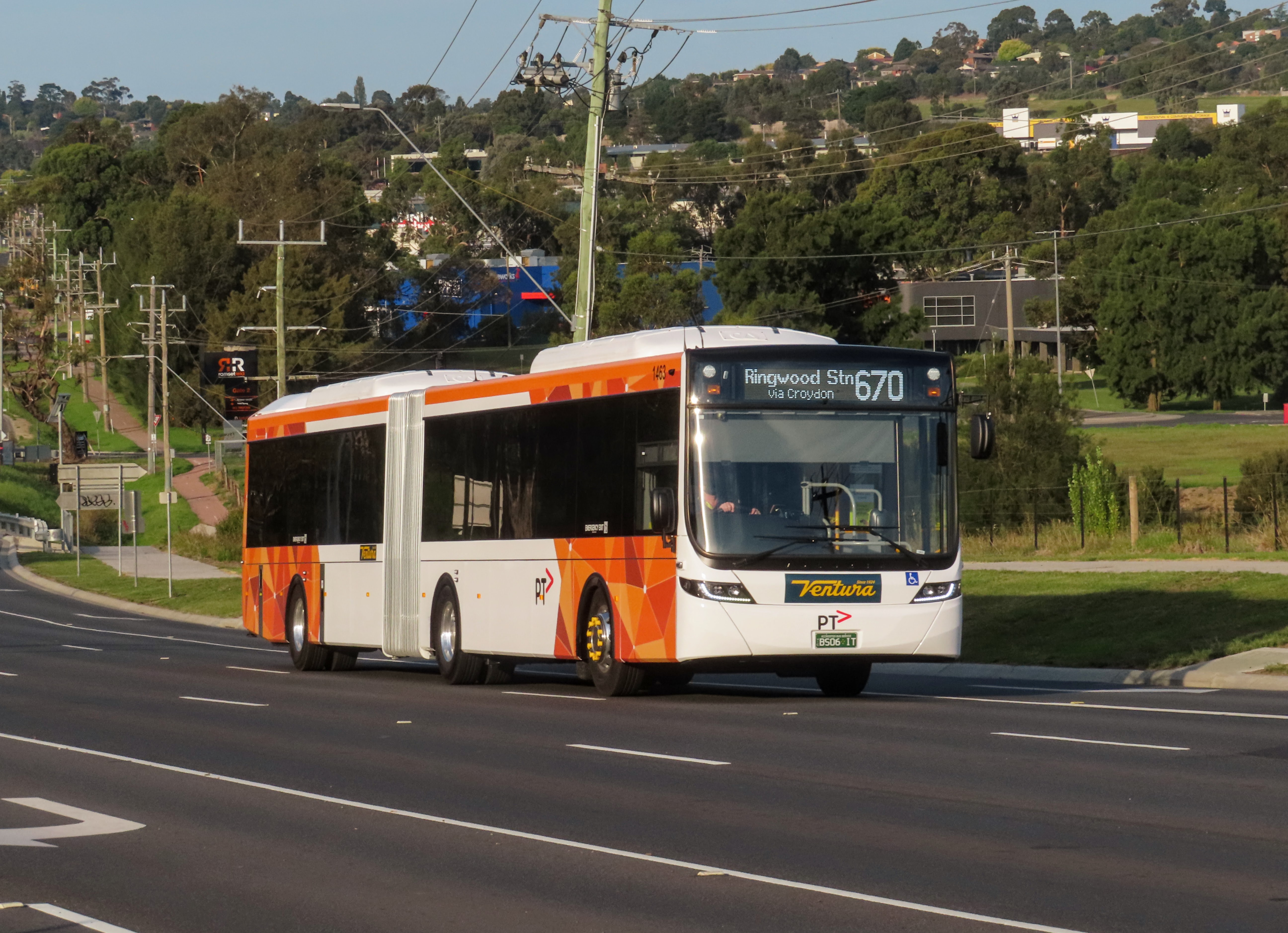
A Ventura bus operating route 670 in Melbourne's Eastern suburbs.

The bus network consists of about 50 bus companies under a franchise agreement with the state Government. Approximately 300 routes are in operation, including twenty-one night bus routes that operate on Friday and Saturday nights. Bus patronage is low compared to similar cities around Australia, which some experts have attributed to the presence of the tram network servicing many trips that would normally be taken by bus. Several 'SmartBus' routes were introduced in the late 2000s in an attempt to improve parts of the system with improved bus priority and frequencies and span of service hours better than most other bus routes at the time. Despite its success at significantly increasing bus patronage, the service has not been expanded and some bus lanes were removed.

Although all Melbourne buses use the myki ticketing system, the SkyBus between Melbourne Airport and Southern Cross railway station is a non-myki bus service. Several local government councils also operate free community bus services in their local areas including Port Phillip, Nillumbik and Darebin

=== Regional train ===
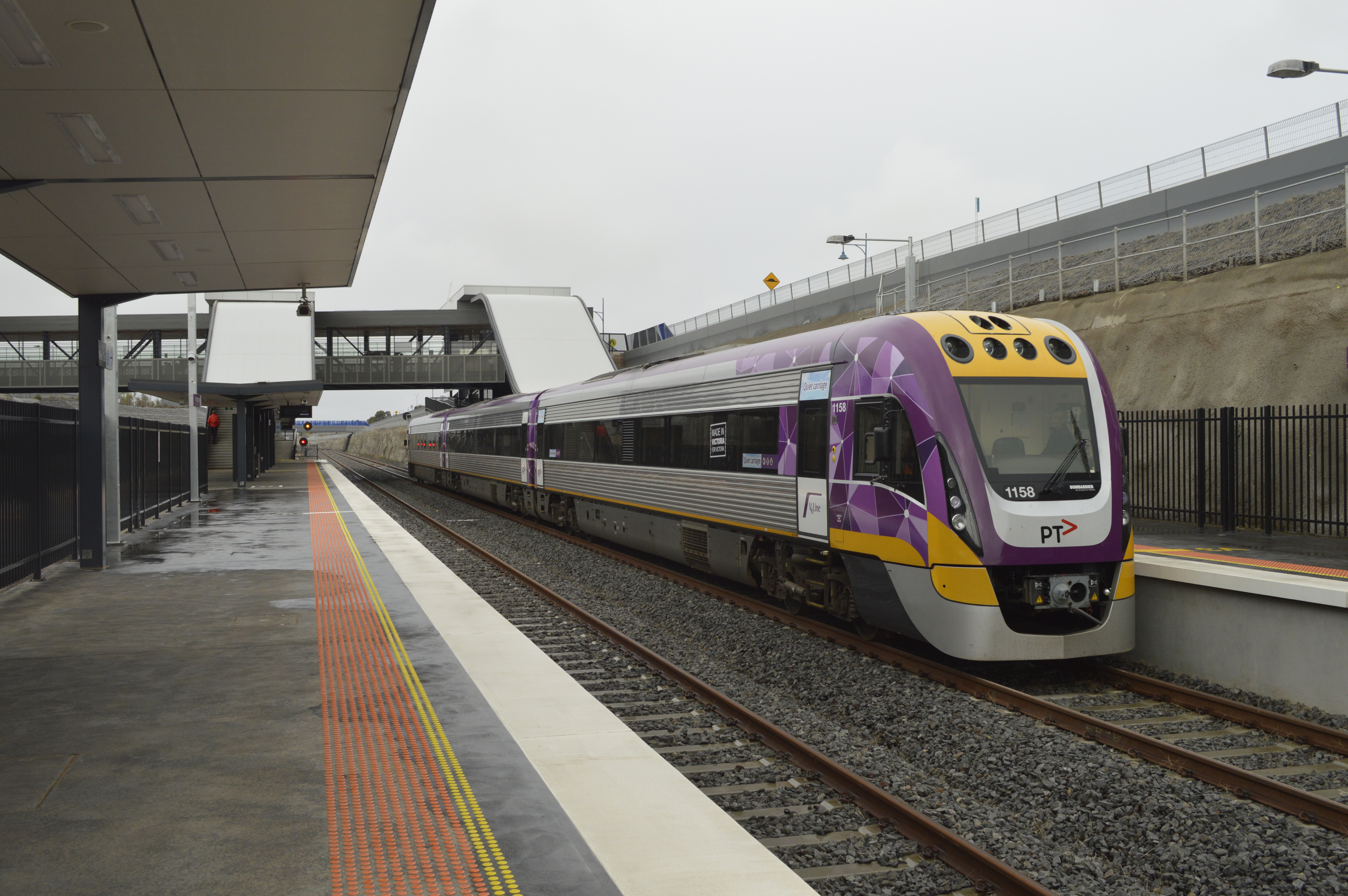
A V/Line VLocity diesel train at Wyndham Vale railway station in PTV livery.

Melbourne is the centre of a statewide railway network consisting of lines used for freight and passenger service. Intrastate passenger services are operated by the government-owned V/Line corporation, with a fleet of locomotive-hauled trains and diesel multiple units. Seven passenger railway lines connect Melbourne to towns and cities in Victoria. Portions of lines which are part of the V/Line network and cover the metropolitan area are also covered by myki tickets.

The city is also connected to Sydney by NSW TrainLink's XPT, and to Adelaide by Journey Beyond's The Overland.

=== Ferry ===
Public Transport Victoria oversees three ferry services in Victoria: the Westgate Punt (between Spotswood and Fishermans Bend), Western Port Ferry, which operates between the Stony Point railway station, French Island and Cowes on Phillip Island and Port Phillip Ferries which operates between Docklands, Geelong and Portarlington.

Cruise ships and ferries (including the Spirit of Tasmania, which crosses Bass Strait to Tasmania) dock at Station Pier on Port Phillip Bay. Privately run ferries and other vessels also travel from Southbank along the Yarra River, to Williamstown, and across Port Phillip Bay.

=== Fares ===
Melbourne has a fully integrated ticketing system across all modes of public transport in the metropolitan area through the Myki contactless smart card system. This requires passengers to touch the card to a reader at each entry and exit point. Myki's rollout began on 29 December 2009 on the rail network. It was then progressively rolled out to trams, buses and regional rail. It completely replaced the old magnetic stripe card Metcard system on 30 June 2013.

Melbourne's public-transport system is divided into two zones, in addition to the free tram zone in the central business district and some surrounding areas. Myki has two forms of tickets: myki money (in which money is loaded on a myki and the system selects the "best fare") and the myki-pass, where commuters pre-purchase tickets (or passes).

== Freight ==
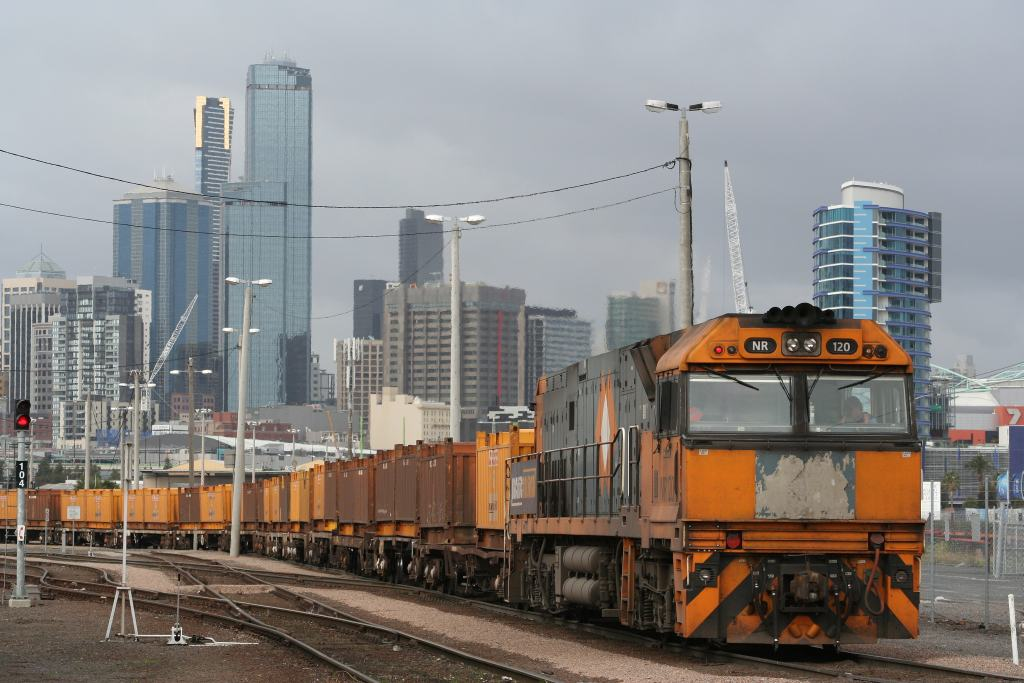
Pacific National locomotive at the Melbourne Steel Terminal, June 2006

The Port of Melbourne is Australia's largest container and general cargo port, handling 33 percent of Australia's container trade. Shipping lines operate to about 300 cities around the world, and 3,200 ships visit the port each year. The port is in Melbourne's inner west, near the junction of the Maribyrnong and Yarra Rivers.

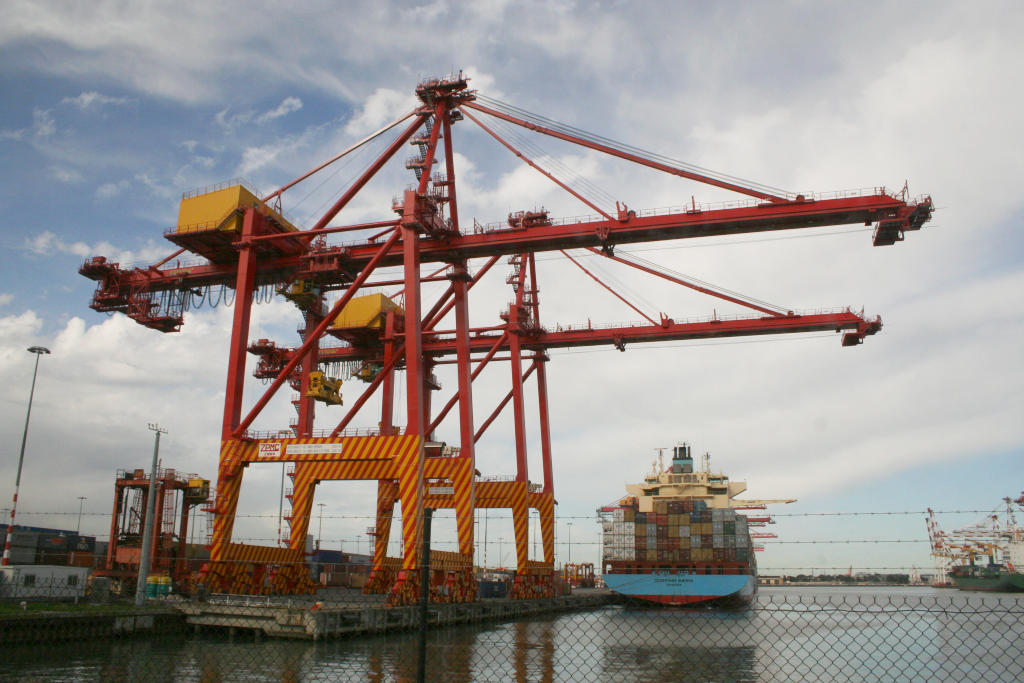
Container crane and ship at Swanson Dock East

Melbourne has an extensive network of railway lines and yards to serve freight traffic. The lines have two gauges – 5 ft 3 in (1,600 mm) broad gauge and 4 ft 8 1/2 in (1,435 mm) standard gauge – and are not electrified. Freight trains have their own lines in the city's inner western suburbs, but in other areas trains are required to share the tracks with Metro Trains Melbourne and V/Line passenger service. Most freight terminals are in the inner suburbs near the port between Melbourne's central business district and Footscray. A number of suburban stations had their own goods yards, with freight trains running on the suburban network until the 1980s.

== Airports ==
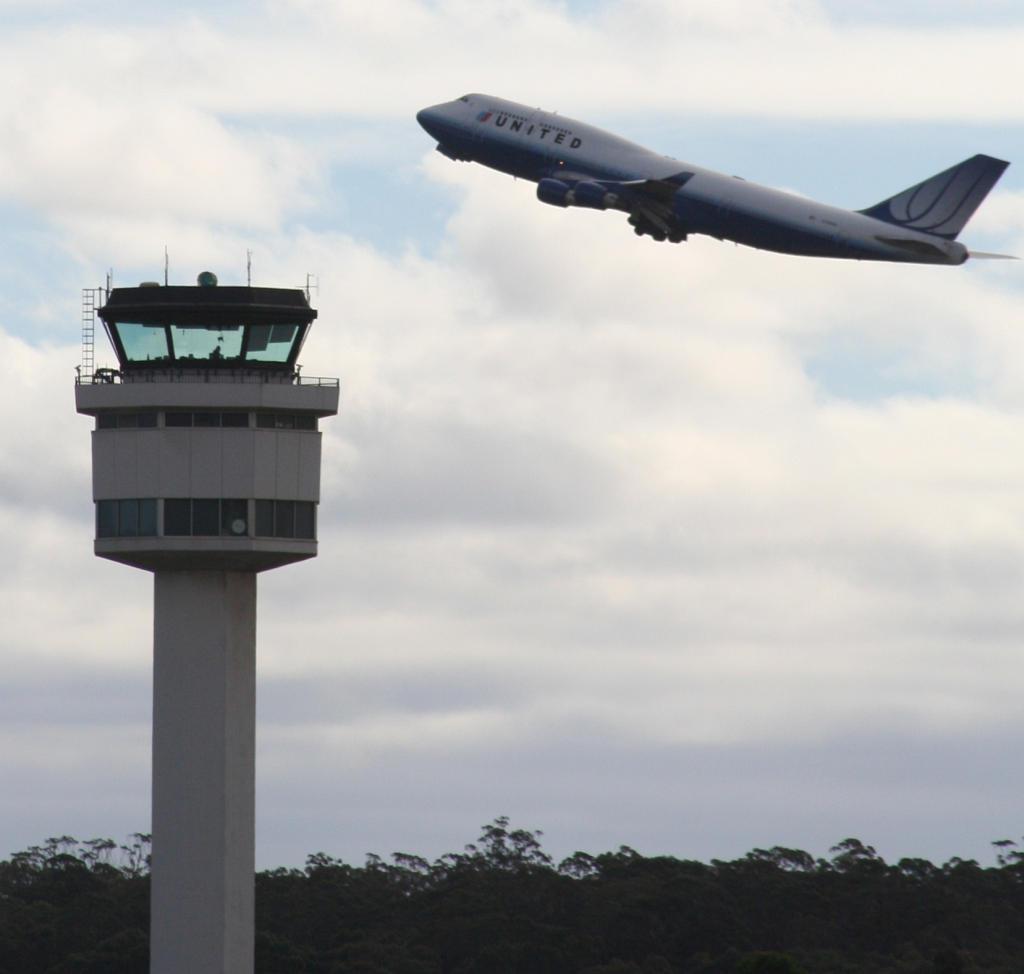
Melbourne Airport

Melbourne Airport, located in the north-western suburb of Tullamarine, is Australia's second-busiest airport. It serves over 30 airlines and 22 million international and domestic passengers annually. The airport is a hub for passenger airlines Qantas, Jetstar and Virgin Australia, and cargo airlines Qantas Freight and Toll Priority.

Melbourne's second major passenger airport, Avalon Airport (Melbourne Avalon), is south-west of the city and north-east of Geelong. Avalon Airport, primarily used by Jetstar, operates flights to Brisbane, Sydney and Perth. AirAsia X began low-cost flights from Avalon to Kuala Lumpur in December 2018, giving Melbourne a second international airport (unique among Australia's capital cities).

The city's first major airport, Essendon Airport, is no longer used for scheduled international flights. Although a small number of regional airlines operate from there, it is primarily used for general aviation and is also home to Victoria's air ambulance.

Moorabbin Airport, south of Melbourne, is primarily used for recreational flying and flying lessons. It has some regional-airline service, notably to King Island, Tasmania. Moorabbin is a Class D airport, and its ICAO airport code is YMMB. RAAF Williams, Point Cook, where the Royal Australian Air Force originated, is located near Melbourne's south-western limits.

== Roads ==
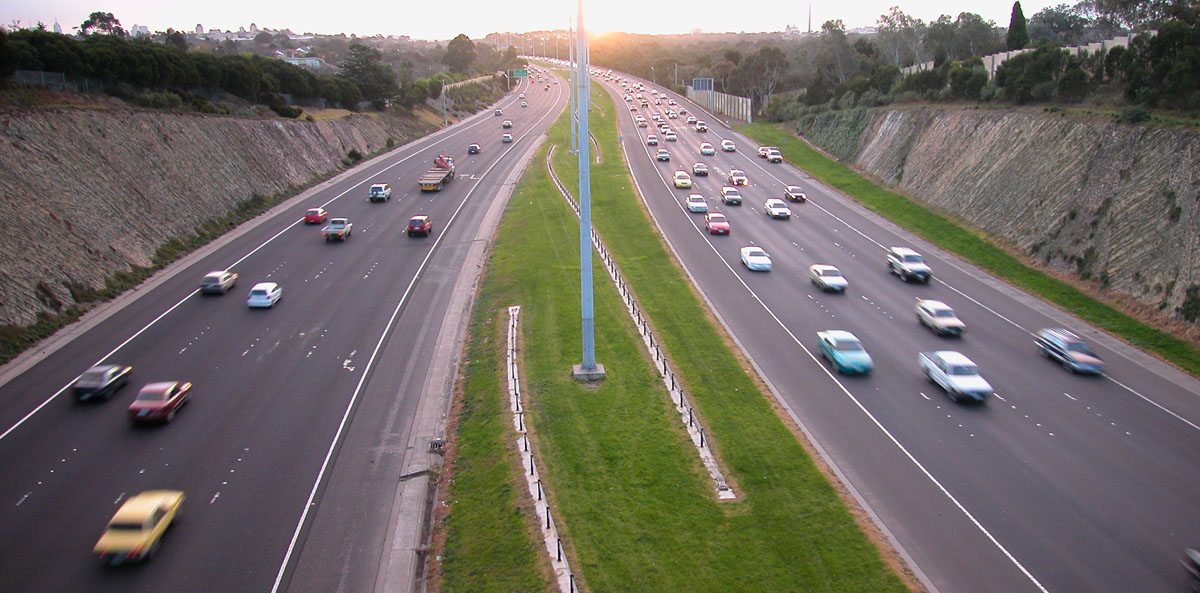
The Eastern Freeway, looking towards Melbourne

Melbourne is one of the world's most car-dependent cities, with 74 percent of all trips to and from work or education being done by car. Its freeway network is the largest in Australia, with an extensive grid of arterial roads dating back to Melbourne's initial surveying. The city's total road length is 21,381 km (13,286 mi).

The freeway network began with the 1969 Melbourne Transportation Plan, which included a grid of freeways which would cover the metropolitan area. The plans were reviewed four years later and many inner-city projects were cancelled. Freeways built during the 1960s and 1970s include the South Eastern Arterial (now part of the Monash Freeway), the Tullamarine Freeway, the Lower Yarra Freeway (now the West Gate Freeway) and the Eastern Freeway.

Expansion took place over the next thirty years, with the Monash Freeway, CityLink and the Western Ring Road all being constructed during this time. The period also saw freeway expansion into the suburbs with the Mornington Peninsula Freeway, an extension of the Eastern Freeway and the South Gippsland Freeway. In 2008, the EastLink toll freeway opened and existing freeways were further extended.

Despite government figures indicating slowed growth in road travel since 2006 (zero growth in 2008–09) and the government's goal to reduce road use to 80 percent of all motorised trips, the State Government have announced several large-scale road infrastructure investments to complete many projects from the original 1969 Plan, including Peninsula Link, East West Link and North East Link). This road construction has continued to increase the use of cars and direct investment away from other transport projects.

== Bicycles ==
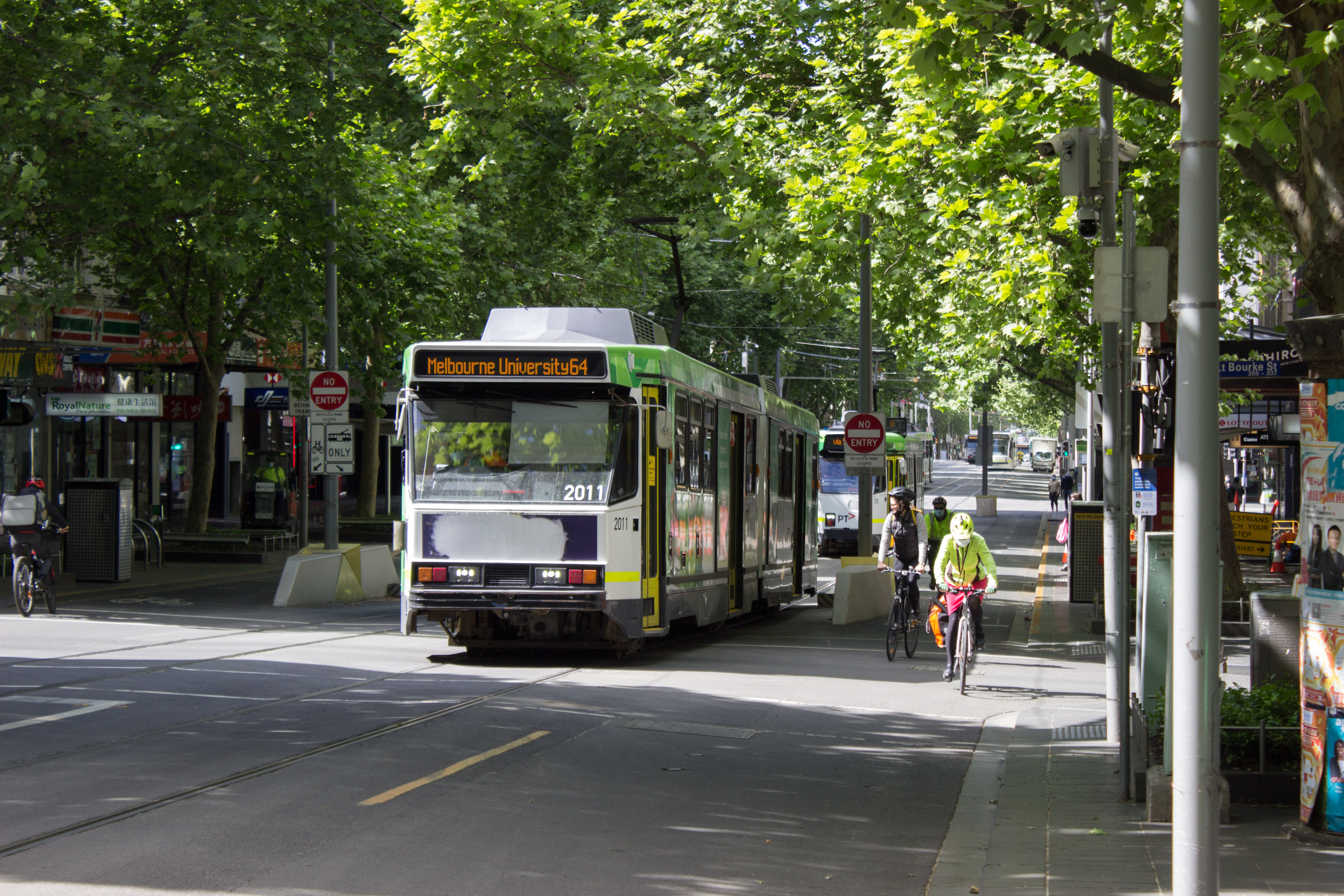
Cyclists next to a tram on Swanston Street in the Melbourne CBD

Despite having a moderate climate and relatively flat landscape, only 1.7% of trips are made by bike in Melbourne. Melbourne has an extensive network of bicycle paths and bike lanes, which are used for recreation and commuting. Five of Australia's top 10 suburbs for bicycle mode share for journeys to work are located in Melbourne. A series of major off-road paths shared with pedestrians caters for bike riders in the inner suburbs, but infrastructure tends to be less extensive further away into surrounding suburbs. In 2020, the City of Melbourne Council sought to add 40 km of new protected cycling lanes for the inner-city as a response to the COVID-19 pandemic.

Inner Melbourne currently has a dock-less e-bike and e-scooter sharing program provided by private company Lime, and an e-scooter sharing program provided by Neuron.

Melbourne previously had a government-owned bicycle-sharing system called Melbourne Bike Share that ran from 2010 to 2019 and was ended due to low ridership. Singaporean bike-sharing company oBike briefly entered the Melbourne market in mid-2017, but abandoned its program in 2018 following extensive complaints and issues with its business practices.

== Taxis ==
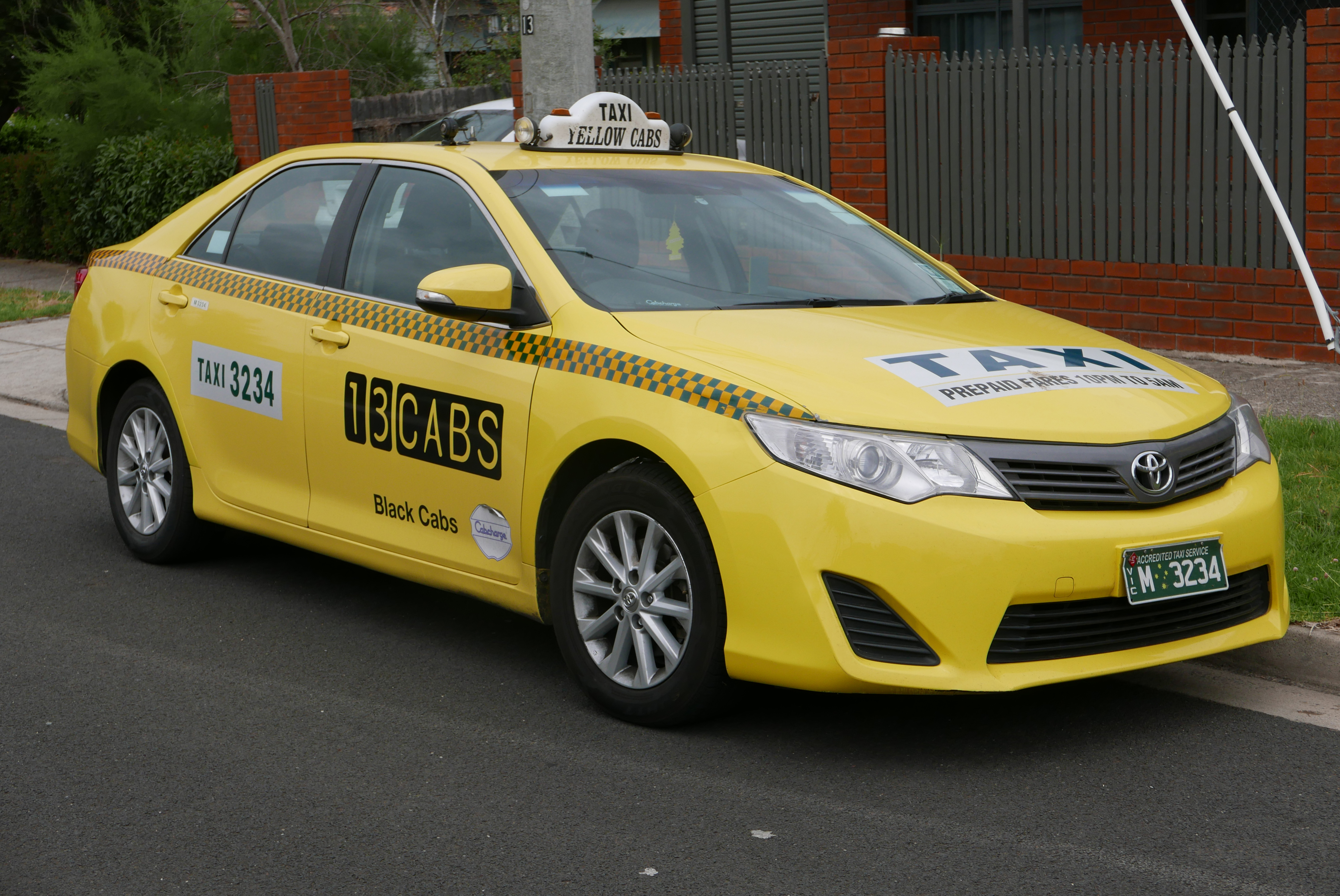
A Melbourne taxi

Taxis in Melbourne have since 1 July 2013 been regulated by the Taxi Services Commission, which began operation on 19 July. The Taxi Industry Inquiry resulted in major reforms to Victoria's taxi industry, significantly impacting taxi service in Melbourne. Taxis were required to be painted canary yellow until this requirement was abolished in 2013. Melbourne has 4,660 licensed, metered taxis, including 443 wheelchair-accessible cabs.

Vehicle for hire companies such as Uber, DiDi, Shofer, Taxify, GoCatch, Shebah, and Ola Cabs, also operate in Melbourne.

== Patronage ==
Chart showing public transport patronage in Melbourne since 1949 split by mode and population.

Chart showing public transport patronage in Greater Melbourne since 1949 as trips per person.

2016 method of travel to work in Greater Melbourne
| Public transport | 16% |
| Car | 67% |

2016 journey to work trips in the Melbourne LGA
| Public transport | 56% |
| Car | 32% |
| Walking | 6% |
| Bicycle | 4% |
| Other | 2% |

== Regulation ==
=== Transport Integration Act ===
The main transport statute in Victoria is the Transport Integration Act 2010, which establishes and sets the charters of the state agencies charged with providing transport and managing the state's transport system. The Department of Transport and Planning is responsible for the integration and coordination of Victoria's transport system under the Transport Victoria brand. However, other departments and agencies also have a coordination and implementation role in transport. Other key state agencies are VicTrack and V/Line.

=== Governing bodies ===
There are several agencies and organisations tasked with coordinating and delivering transport in Victoria. Many fall within the purview of Transport for Victoria, but others are run from other departments or are independent government organisations.

==== Public Transport Victoria ====
In 2010, the state government resolved to create a new independent agency to coordinate and oversee all aspects of the state's public transport. According to the government, the authority would plan, co-ordinate, manage and administer metropolitan trams and metropolitan and regional buses and trains, replacing the previous structure of multiple agencies. The authority was established in late 2011, and was expected to be fully operational by mid-2012. Public Transport Victoria assumed the rail, tram and bus responsibilities of the former Director of Public Transport and the activities of the Transport Ticketing Authority and MetLink, which were abolished.

==== Transport for Victoria ====
In 2016, the state government established a new coordinating agency for transport in the state. It serves as an umbrella agency, overseeing the activities of several other transport organisations and agencies across multiple modes of transport. This includes VicRoads, Public Transport Victoria and V/Line. The agency was established in 2017 and operates under the Department of Economic Development, Jobs, Transport and Resources.

==== Taxi Services Commission ====
The government announced a Taxi Industry Inquiry and the establishment of a Taxi Services Commission (TSC) in early 2011. The inquiry, headed by Allan Fels, was conducted by the TSC. The government introduced the Transport Legislation Amendment (Taxi Services Reform and Other Matters) Act 2011, which was enacted in late June 2011 to empower the inquiry. The TSC, established on 19 July 2011, became the state's taxi and hire-car regulator on 1 July 2013.

==== Port of Hastings Development Authority ====
The government reversed the late-2010 merger of the Port of Melbourne Corporation (PMC) and the Port of Hastings Corporation by establishing the new Port of Hastings Development Authority to oversee development of a new port in Hastings. The Transport Legislation Amendment (Port of Hastings Development Authority) Bill 2011 was passed by the Parliament of Victoria in late 2011, and the authority began operations on 1 January 2012.

=== Safety regulation ===
The safety of rail operations in Melbourne is regulated by the 2006 Rail Safety Act, which applies to commercial passenger and freight operations and tourist and heritage railways. The act created a framework of safety requirements for all rail-industry participants, and requires rail operators who manage infrastructure and rolling stock to obtain accreditation before commencing operations. Accredited rail operators are required to have a safety-management system to guide their operations. Sanctions for violations of the safety requirements established by the Rail Safety Act are outlined in the Transport (Compliance and Miscellaneous) Act 1983.

Safety regulation of the bus and marine sectors is overseen by the Director, Transport Safety under the 2009 Bus Safety Act and the Marine Act 1988, respectively. The sectors are subject to a no-fault safety-investigation plan conducted by the Chief Investigator, Transport Safety. The safety regulator for Melbourne's rail, bus and marine systems is Transport Safety Victoria, established under the Transport Integration Act 2010.

Rail, bus and marine operators in Victoria can be subjected to no-fault investigations by the Chief Investigator, Transport Safety or the Australian Transport Safety Bureau (ATSB). The chief investigator is charged by Part 7 of the Transport Integration Act 2010 with investigating rail, bus and marine safety matters, including incidents. The ATSB has jurisdiction over rail matters (on a designated interstate rail network), marine matters (if the ship(s) is under Australian or AMSA regulation) and bus-safety matters (by invitation of a jurisdiction).

=== Fares, ticketing and conduct ===
Ticketing requirements for rail, tram and bus service in Victoria are primarily contained in Transport (Ticketing) Regulations 2006 and the Victorian Fares and Ticketing Manual. Rules about safe and fair behaviour on trains and trams in Victoria are generally contained in the Transport (Compliance and Miscellaneous) Act 1983 and Transport (Conduct) Regulations 2005. Conduct requirements for buses are set out in that act and Transport (Passenger Vehicles) Regulations 2005.

== See also ==
- Transportation in Australia
