= List of acts of the Parliament of Victoria from 2017 =

This is a list of acts of the Parliament of Victoria, Australia for the year 2017.

== 2017 ==
Short title, or popular name	Citation	Royal assent
Long title
Energy Legislation Amendment (Feed-in Tariffs and Improving Safety and Markets) Act 2017	No. 1 of 2017	14 February 2017
An Act to amend the Electricity Industry Act 2000, (Note: Electricity Industry Act 2000 (No. 68 of 2000)) the Electricity Safety Act 1998, (Note: Electricity Safety Act 1998 (No. 25 of 1998)) the Gas Safety Act 1997, (Note: Gas Safety Act 1997 (No. 99 of 1997)) the National Electricity (Victoria) Act 2005, (Note: National Electricity (Victoria) Act 2005 (No. 8 of 2005)) the National Gas (Victoria) Act 2008 (Note: National Gas (Victoria) Act 2008 (No. 30 of 2008)) and the Victorian Energy Efficiency Target Act 2007 (Note: Victorian Energy Efficiency Target Act 2007 (No. 70 of 2007)) and for other purposes.
Food Amendment (Kilojoule Labelling Scheme and Other Matters) Act 2017	No. 2 of 2017	
Transport Integration Amendment (Head, Transport for Victoria and Other Governance Reforms) Act 2017	No. 3 of 2017	
Children Legislation Amendment (Reportable Conduct) Act 2017	No. 4 of 2017	
Climate Change Act 2017 or the Climate Action Act 2017	No. 5 of 2017	28 February 2017
An Act to repeal and re-enact with amendments the Climate Change Act 2010, (Note: Climate Change Act 2010 (No. 54 of 2010)) to establish greenhouse gas emissions reduction targets for Victoria, to set out policy objectives and guiding principles, to provide for climate change planning and reporting, to provide for forestry rights and carbon sequestration rights and to make consequential amendments to the Environment Protection Act 1970 (Note: Environment Protection Act 1970 (No. 8056)) and for other purposes.
Crimes Legislation Further Amendment Act 2017	No. 6 of 2017	
Heritage Act 2017	No. 7 of 2017	15 March 2017
An Act to re-enact with amendments the Heritage Act 1995 (Note: Heritage Act 1995 (No. 93 of 1995)) to provide for the protection and conservation of places and objects of cultural heritage significance, to establish a Victorian Heritage Register and a Heritage Inventory, to establish a Heritage Council, to create offences and other enforcement measures to protect and conserve cultural heritage and to establish a Heritage Fund and for other purposes.
Resources Legislation Amendment (Fracking Ban) Act 2017	No. 8 of 2017	
Education and Care Services National Law Amendment Act 2017	No. 9 of 2017	
Urban Renewal Authority Victoria Amendment (Development Victoria) Act 2017	No. 10 of 2017	
Victorian Planning Authority Act 2017	No. 11 of 2017	
Wrongs Amendment (Organisational Child Abuse) Act 2017	No. 12 of 2017	
Consumer Acts Amendment Act 2017	No. 13 of 2017	
Creative Victoria Act 2017	No. 14 of 2017	
Lord Mayor's Charitable Foundation Act 2017	No. 15 of 2017	
Small Business Commission Act 2017	No. 16 of 2017	
Statute Law Repeals Act 2017 (repealed)	No. 17 of 2017	10 May 2017
An Act to repeal certain spent Acts. (Repealed by Statute Law Repeals Act 2017 (No. 17 of 2017))
Electricity Safety Amendment (Bushfire Mitigation Civil Penalties Scheme) Act 2017	No. 18 of 2017	
Family Violence Protection Amendment Act 2017	No. 19 of 2017	
Freedom of Information Amendment (Office of the Victorian Information Commissioner) Act 2017	No. 20 of 2017	
Building Amendment (Enforcement and Other Measures) Act 2017	No. 21 of 2017	
Mineral Resources (Sustainable Development) Amendment (Latrobe Valley Mine Rehabilitation Commissioner) Act 2017	No. 22 of 2017	
Family Violence Protection Amendment (Information Sharing) Act 2017	No. 23 of 2017	
City of Greater Geelong Amendment Act 2017	No. 24 of 2017	
Sex Offenders Registration Amendment (Miscellaneous) Act 2017	No. 25 of 2017	
Bail Amendment (Stage One) Act 2017	No. 26 of 2017	
Parliamentary Budget Officer Act 2017	No. 27 of 2017	
State Taxation Acts Amendment Act 2017	No. 29 of 2017	
Appropriation (2017-2018) Act 2017	No. 29 of 2017	27 June 2017
An Act for the appropriation of certain sums out of the Consolidated Fund for the ordinary annual services of the Government for the financial year 2017/2018 and for other purposes.
Appropriation (Parliament 2017-2018) Act 2017	No. 30 of 2017	27 June 2017
An Act for the appropriation of certain sums out of the Consolidated Fund for the Parliament in respect of the financial year 2017/2018 and for other purposes.
Corrections Legislation Miscellaneous Amendment Act 2017	No. 31 of 2017	
Crimes Legislation Amendment (Public Order) Act 2017	No. 32 of 2017	
Disability Amendment Act 2017	No. 33 of 2017	
Sentencing Amendment (Sentencing Standards) Act 2017	No. 34 of 2017	
Commercial Passenger Vehicle Industry Act 2017	No. 35 of 2017	22 August 2017
An Act to impose a levy on the provision of commercial passenger vehicle services, to amend the Transport (Compliance and Miscellaneous) Act 1983, (Note: Transport Act 1983 (No. 9921)) the Transport Integration Act 2010, (Note: Transport Integration Act 2010 (No. 6 of 2010)) the Bus Safety Act 2009, (Note: Bus Safety Act 2009 (No. 13 of 2009)) the Road Safety Act 1986 (Note: Road Safety Act 1986 (No. 127 of 1986)) and the Taxation Administration Act 1997 (Note: Taxation Administration Act 1997 (No. 40 of 1997)) and for other purposes.
Local Government (Central Goldfields Shire Council) Act 2017	No. 36 of 2017	
Jury Directions and Other Acts Amendment Act 2017	No. 37 of 2017	
Justice Legislation Amendment (Court Security, Juries and Other Matters) Act 2017	No. 38 of 2017	
Public Administration Amendment (Public Sector Communication Standards) Act 2017	No. 39 of 2017	
Drugs, Poisons and Controlled Substances Miscellaneous Amendment Act 2017	No. 40 of 2017	
Administration and Probate and Other Acts Amendment (Succession and Related Matters) Act 2017	No. 41 of 2017	
Land Legislation Amendment Act 2017	No. 42 of 2017	
Children and Justice Legislation Amendment (Youth Justice Reform) Act 2017	No. 43 of 2017	
Domestic Animals Amendment (Restricted Breed Dogs) Act 2017	No. 44 of 2017	
Justice Legislation Amendment (Protective Services Officers and Other Matters) Act 2017	No. 45 of 2017	
Owner Drivers and Forestry Contractors Amendment Act 2017	No. 46 of 2017	
Planning and Building Legislation Amendment (Housing Affordability and Other Matters) Act 2017	No. 47 of 2017	
Worksafe Legislation Amendment Act 2017	No. 48 of 2017	
Yarra River Protection (Wilip-gin Birrarung murron) Act 2017	No. 49 of 2017	
Drugs, Poisons and Controlled Substances Amendment (Real-time Prescription Monitoring) Act 2017	No. 50 of 2017	
Environment Protection Act 2017	No. 51 of 2017	24 October 2017
An Act to provide for the continuation of the Environment Protection Authority, to specify a new objective of the Authority, to provide for a new governance structure of the continued Authority, to provide for the Governing Board of the Authority and to make consequential amendments to the Environment Protection Act 1970 and the Public Administration Act 2004 (Note: Public Administration Act 2004 (No. 108 of 2004)) and for other purposes.
Health Legislation Amendment (Quality and Safety) Act 2017	No. 52 of 2017	
Parks and Crown Land Legislation Amendment Act 2017	No. 53 of 2017	
Justice Legislation Amendment (Body-worn Cameras and Other Matters) Act 2017	No. 54 of 2017	
Ports and Marine Legislation Amendment Act 2017	No. 55 of 2017	
Renewable Energy (Jobs and Investment) Act 2017	No. 56 of 2017	
Serious Sex Offenders (Detention and Supervision) Amendment (Governance) Act 2017	No. 57 of 2017	
Caulfield Racecourse Reserve Act 2017	No. 58 of 2017	
Fines Reform Amendment Act 2017	No. 59 of 2017	
Victorian Data Sharing Act 2017	No. 60 of 2017	
Voluntary Assisted Dying Act 2017	No. 61 of 2017	5 December 2017
An Act to provide for and regulate access to voluntary assisted dying, to establish the Voluntary Assisted Dying Review Board, to make consequential amendments to the Births, Deaths and Marriages Registration Act 1996, (Note: Births, Deaths and Marriages Registration Act 1996 (No. 43 of 1996)) the Coroners Act 2008, (Note: Coroners Act 2008 (No. 77 of 2008)) the Drugs, Poisons and Controlled Substances Act 1981, (Note: Drugs, Poisons and Controlled Substances Act 1981 (No. 9719)) the Health Records Act 2001, (Note: Health Records Act 2001 (No. 2 of 2001)) the Medical Treatment Planning and Decisions Act 2016, (Note: Medical Treatment Planning and Decisions Act 2016 (No. 69 of 2016)) the Pharmacy Regulation Act 2010 (Note: Pharmacy Regulation Act 2010 (No. 39 of 2010)) and other Acts and for other purposes.
Gambling Regulation Amendment (Gaming Machine Arrangements) Act 2017	No. 62 of 2017	
Commercial Passenger Vehicle Industry Amendment (Further Reforms) Act 2017	No. 63 of 2017	
Corrections Legislation Further Amendment Act 2017	No. 64 of 2017	
Crimes Legislation Amendment (Protection of Emergency Workers and Others) Act 2017	No. 65 of 2017	
Drugs, Poisons and Controlled Substances Amendment (Medically Supervised Injecting Centre) Act 2017	No. 66 of 2017	
State Taxation Acts Further Amendment Act 2017	No. 67 of 2017	
Transport Legislation Amendment (Road Safety, Rail and Other Matters) Act 2017	No. 68 of 2017	
Domestic Animals Amendment (Puppy Farms and Pet Shops) Act 2017	No. 69 of 2017	20 December 2017
An Act to amend the Domestic Animals Act 1994 (Note: Domestic (Feral and Nuisance) Animals Act 1994 (No. 81 of 1994)) to regulate the number of fertile female dogs to be kept by breeding domestic animal businesses, to further regulate the breeding of dogs and cats and the sale of dogs and cats in pet shops, to provide for registration of foster carers and for single use permits to sell certain animals, to further provide for the administration and enforcement of that Act and legal proceedings and to provide for other minor and related matters and for other purposes.

== Sources ==
- "Acts as made: 2017". Victoria Legislation.
