= Graeme Samuel =

Australian businessman

Graeme Samuel AC

Chairman of the Australian Competition & Consumer Commission
- In office 1 July 2003 – 31 July 2011
- Preceded by: Allan Fels
- Succeeded by: Rod Sims

Personal details
- Education: LL.B, University of Melbourne; LL.M, Monash University
- Profession: Lawyer

Graeme Julian Samuel AC (born 31 May 1946) is an Australian businessman. He was the Managing Director and head of the Melbourne office of M&A advisory firm Greenhill Caliburn, and is a member of the Australian National University Council. He previously served as the chairman of the Australian Competition & Consumer Commission from 1 July 2003 to 31 July 2011.

== Early life and education ==
Samuel was educated at Wesley College, Melbourne, and studied law at both the University of Melbourne (LLB) and Monash University (LLM). He has had a long career in law, working as a partner in Melbourne law firm Phillips Fox & Masel, and in business served as the executive director of Macquarie Bank from 1981 to 1986.

== Career ==
Samuel has also had extensive involvement in senior levels of sports management in Australia. Samuel was a member of the Australian Rugby League Commission, which governs the NRL and is a former commissioner of the Australian Football League (he became a life member of the league in 1995). During his time as AFL commissioner, Samuel was one of the so-called "faceless men" who were vilified by supporters during the attempted merger or relocation of clubs such as Footscray, Fitzroy, Melbourne and Hawthorn.

On 3 May 1995, The Age highlighted Samuel's vision for the future of the AFL under the title 'The Samuel Vision' — which included the following major points:

- Port Adelaide's entry to the AFL is a priority
- The AFL is being damaged by maintaining 11 clubs in Victoria
- Fitzroy should consider merging with Brisbane
- Commission should no longer deal with issues of discipline
- Waverley Park's future will depend on how many clubs are in the competition
- A minimum salary cap should be considered for clubs
- Western Oval is not necessarily the best place for Footscray
- Minimum level of contribution to AFL revenue a condition of clubs keeping license

Samuel was also the chairman of the Melbourne and Olympic Parks Trust, which oversees both Melbourne Park and Olympic Park.

In July 2012, Samuel was appointed Chairman of the Victorian Taxi Services Commission following the Victorian Government's initiative to clean up and provide better regulation around the taxi cab industry. The Government's Taxi Industry Inquiry headed by Allan Fels recommended sweeping reforms to improve taxi services in Victoria. Samuel is charged with overseeing on the ground implementation of Fels' reforms.

From 29 October 2019, Samuel conducted the second independent review of the Environment Protection and Biodiversity Conservation Act 1999, the primary biodiversity protection legislation in Australia. Supported by an expert panel, the final report was submitted on 30 October 2020 to the Minister of the Environment, Sussan Ley, making 38 recommendations.

== Not For Profit roles ==
Chair of Dementia Australia

== Recognition ==
On 8 June 1998 he was appointed an Officer of the Order of Australia.

On 14 June 2010 he was promoted to Companion of the Order of Australia in the Queens's Birthday Honours list for services to the community, public administration, economic reform and corporate law.

On 1 January 2001 he was awarded the Centenary Medal.

On 16 January 2001 he was awarded the Australian Sports Medal.

Government offices
Preceded by Allan Fels	Chairman of the Australian Competition & Consumer Commission; 2003–2011	Succeeded by Rod Sims
