= Rod Sims =

Australian economist and former public servant

Rod Sims AO
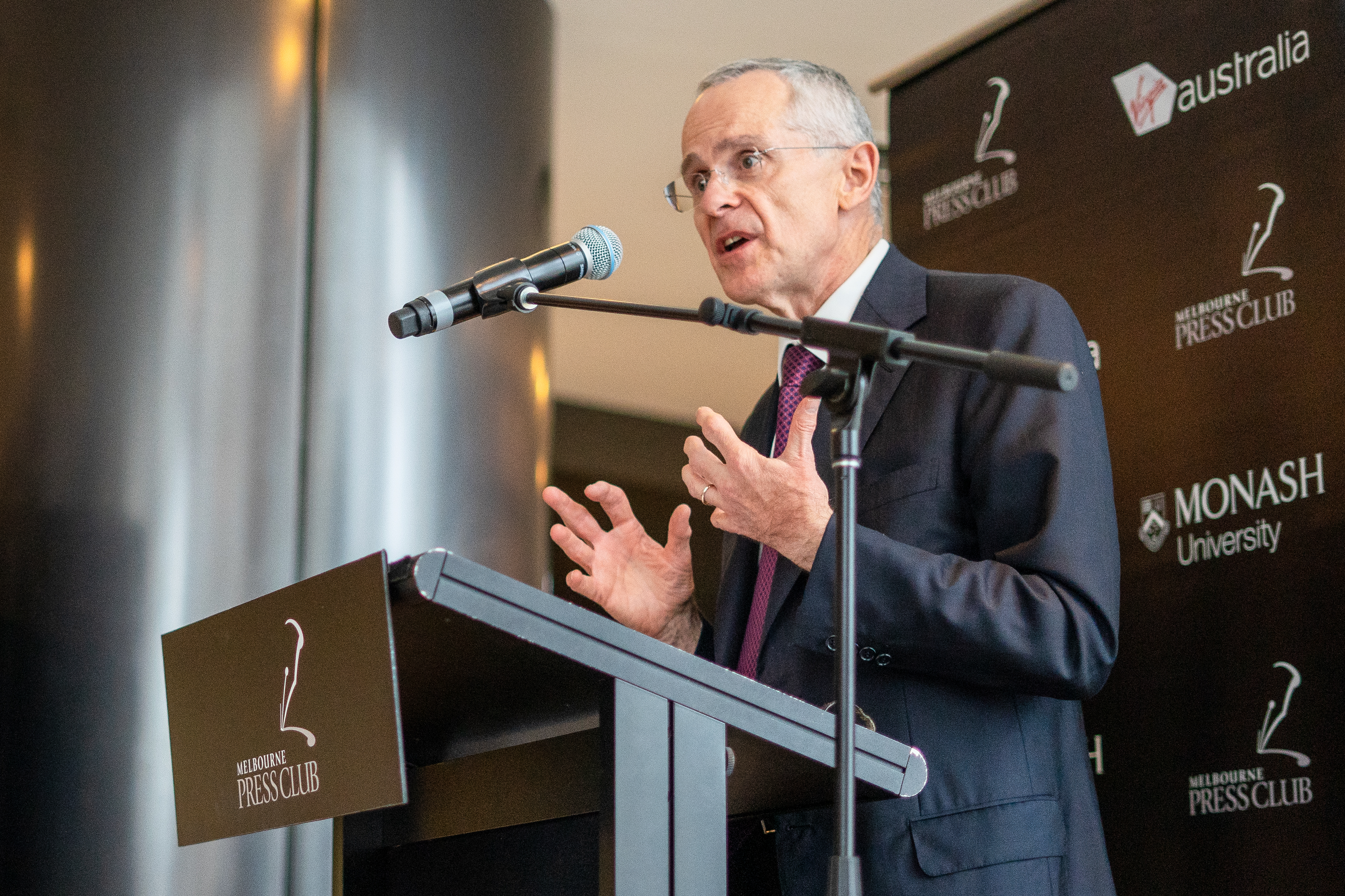
- Sims speaks at a Melbourne Press Club lunch in 2019.

Chairman of the Australian Competition & Consumer Commission
- In office 1 August 2011 – 20 March 2022
- Preceded by: Graeme Samuel
- Succeeded by: Gina Cass-Gottlieb

Personal details
- Born: Rodney Graham Sims; 1950 (age 75–76) Lorne, Victoria, Australia
- Education: B.Com (Hons), University of Melbourne; M.Ec, Australian National University
- Profession: Economist, government official

Rodney Graham Sims AO (born 1950) is an Australian economist and former public servant. Sims served as chair of the Australian Competition & Consumer Commission (ACCC), Australia's competition regulator, from 1 August 2011 to 20 March 2022.

Described as "the most feared man in Australian business" by the Australian Financial Review, Sims was the longest serving ACCC chair in the agency's history. As chair of the ACCC, he was noted for having presided over scrutiny of "Big Tech" companies Google and Facebook.

== Early life and education ==
Sims was born in Lorne, Victoria in 1950. His father, originally from Colac, ran a general store in Lorne, and died when Sims was 14. Sims' mother, originally from Birregurra, would then raise Sims and his three sisters.

Sims received a scholarship to attend university, and graduated with first class honours degree in Commerce from the University of Melbourne. Sims later went on to receive a Master of Economics degree from the Australian National University in Canberra.

== Early career ==
Sims worked as a development economist in Papua New Guinea as well as for the Commonwealth Secretariat. He was also formerly a Deputy Secretary in the Department of the Prime Minister and Cabinet and in the Department of Transport.

=== Hawke Government ===
Sims held the position of chief economics advisor to Prime Minister Bob Hawke, having succeeded Ross Garnaut in this capacity. Despite his association with Hawke and his professional links with Thérèse Rein, spouse of former Prime Minister Kevin Rudd, Sims has indicated that he is not a "Labor man", stating:

"I’ve never been political in the sense that my interest is totally in public policy outcomes”

As Hawke's chief economics advisor, Sims accompanied Hawke at a state dinner at the White House hosted by U.S. President George H. W. Bush.

=== InfraCo Asia Development (IAD) ===
Sims has previously held roles with the InfraCo Asia Development (IAD) as a founding Non-Executive Director and as chairman, a position in held from May 2010 until June 2011. Sims has also held a directorship at Port Jackson Partners.

== Australian Competition & Consumer Commission (ACCC) ==
In May 2011, the Gillard Government announced the nomination of Sims to lead the Australian Competition & Consumer Commission (ACCC). On 1 August 2011, Sims officially took office as ACCC chair, replacing Graeme Samuel. At the time of his appointment, many competition lawyers expected Sims to take a "tougher" line on anti-competitive conduct than his predecessor.

In 2013 and 2014, Sims' ACCC pushed supermarket companies Coles and Woolworths to limit the size and scope of so-called "shopper dockets" that were seen as undercutting small businesses. In 2020, Sims accused telco giant Telstra of exploiting Aboriginal Australian customers following reports of unfair selling practices; the ACCC would later secure a $50 million fine for Telstra over the company's conduct.

Sims retired as ACCC chairman on 22 March 2022. He was succeeded in the position by Gina Cass-Gottlieb.

=== Tech industry ===
Under Sims' leadership, the ACCC has launched lawsuits against both Google and Facebook over alleged misuse of user data. Following an agency review of Google and Facebook's impact on local journalism, the ACCC recommended the creation of a News Media Bargaining Code. Since its implementation, Sims has argued that it has proven "extremely successful" for Australian media companies, though he has criticized Facebook for failing to negotiate “in the right spirit” with media.

In a 2022 interview with The Information, Sims stated that he prefers "pro-competition rules" over proposals to break up so-called Big Tech companies through antitrust enforcement.

== Post-ACCC career ==
In August 2023, Federal Treasurer Jim Chalmers appointed Sims to the Competition Taskforce Advisory Panel, which has been established to advise the Treasury on national competition policy.

== Personal life and honours ==
Sims is a resident of Vaucluse, New South Wales, and stated in 2019 that he commutes to work every day of the week. In 2022, Sims was appointed as Officer of the Order of Australia (AO) in the 2022 Australia Day Honours for distinguished service to public administration in economic policy and regulatory roles. Sims is an avid supporter of the Hawthorn Football Club and has stated that he does not use Facebook, but does have a Twitter account "to receive not send".

Government offices
Preceded by Graeme Samuel	Chairman of the Australian Competition & Consumer Commission; 2011–2022	Succeeded by Gina Cass-Gottlieb
