= Gina Cass-Gottlieb =

Australian lawyer

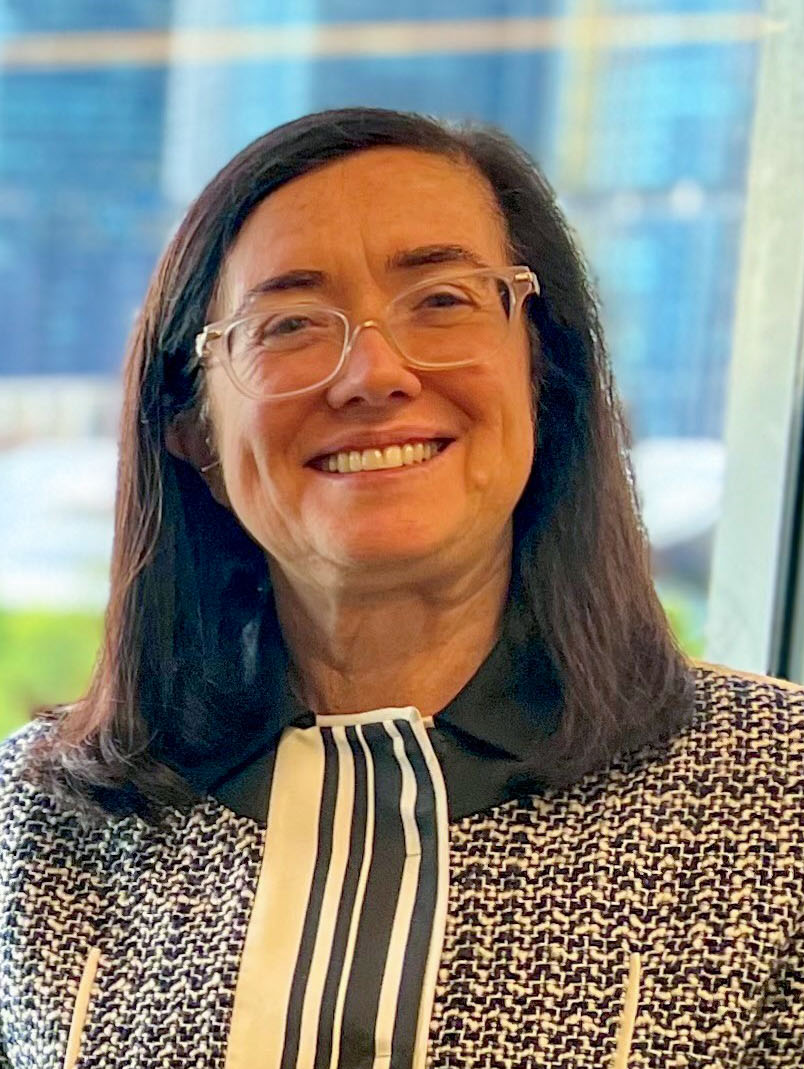
- Gina Cass-Gottlieb, 2024

Chair of the Australian Competition & Consumer Commission
- Incumbent
- Assumed office 21 March 2022
- Preceded by: Rod Sims

Personal details
- Born: 1960 or 1961 (age 64–65)
- Education: University of Sydney; University of California, Berkeley
- Profession: Lawyer

Gina Cass-Gottlieb is an Australian attorney and government official. She has served as the chair of the Australian Competition and Consumer Commission (ACCC) since 21 March 2022.

== Education ==
Cass-Gottlieb attended Sydney Girls High School. She holds a Bachelor of Laws and Bachelor of Economics from the University of Sydney, and was a Fulbright Scholar at University of California, Berkeley from 1986 to 1987, graduating with a Master of Laws with a focus on United States competition law, financial regulation, and securities regulation.

== Career ==
Cass-Gottlieb was a partner at Blake Dawson Waldron before founding the Competition and Regulation Group at Gilbert + Tobin, where she was a senior partner from the early 1990s until March 2022.

She became a member of the Payments System Board of the Reserve Bank of Australia in 2013 and of the Financial Regulator Assessment Authority in 2021.

On 21 March 2022, she became the chair of the Australian Competition and Consumer Commission, the first woman to hold the position. Her appointment drew criticism from former prime minister Kevin Rudd for her connections to News Corp and the Murdoch family.

== Personal life ==
Gina Cass-Gottlieb is the daughter of Cecil Cass, an orthopedic surgeon, and Bettina Cass, a sociologist and women's rights activist. Her uncle, Moss Cass, was a physician and the Minister for the Environment and Water during the Whitlam government.

She married Stephen Gottlieb in February 1984.

Government offices
Preceded by Rod Sims	Chair of the Australian Competition & Consumer Commission; 2022-	Incumbent
