= Safe Transport Victoria =

Australian government agency

Agency overview
- Preceding agencies: Commercial Passenger Vehicles Victoria; Taxi Services Commission; Victorian Taxi Directorate
- Minister responsible: Gabrielle Williams, Minister for Public and Active Transport
- Agency executives: Megan Bourke-O'Neil, Chair; Aaron de Rozario, Chief executive
- Parent department: Department of Transport and Planning
- Parent agency: Transport for Victoria
- Key document: Transport Integration Act 2010
- Website: cpv.vic.gov.au
- Agency ID: PROV VA 5010

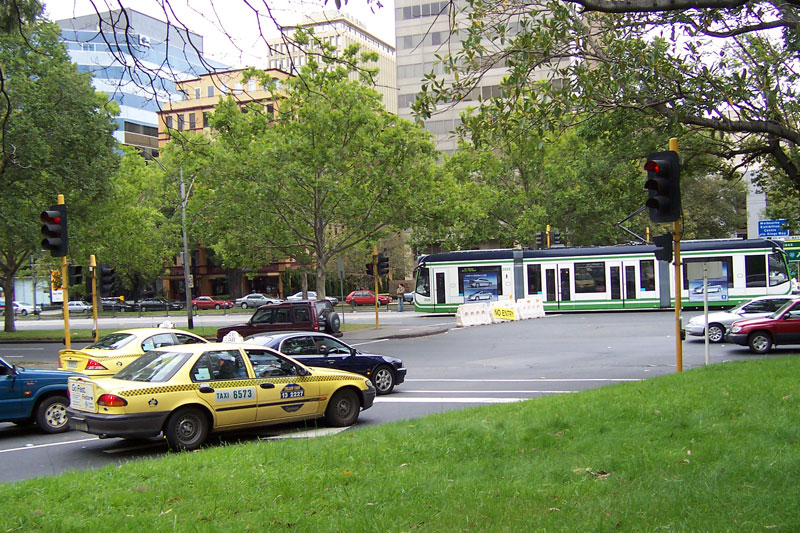
Taxis and trams in Melbourne.

Safe Transport Victoria (STV), until 2023 known as Commercial Passenger Vehicles Victoria (CPVV), and until 2 June 2018 called the Taxi Services Commission (TSC), is the Government agency responsible for the regulation of the taxi and hire car industries in the Victoria, Australia. Before becoming a regulator, the TSC was responsible for conducting a major independent inquiry, the Taxi Industry Inquiry, into taxi and other small commercial passenger vehicle services in the State.

STV was created as a statutory corporation by the Transport Legislation Amendment (Taxi Services Reform and Other Matters) Act 2011, which amended the State's prime transport statute, the Transport Integration Act 2010, and the Transport (Compliance and Miscellaneous) Act 1983. It was renamed CPVV on 2 June 2018, to reflect its broader role regulating mobility as a service companies and other commercial passenger services.

The TSC commenced operation in its initial inquiry phase on 19 July 2011, and became the State's ongoing taxi regulator in place of the Victorian Taxi Directorate on 1 July 2013. It was chaired by former Australian Competition & Consumer Commission Chairman and Australian businessman Graeme Samuel.

== Taxi Industry Inquiry ==
The TSC was established due to continuing concerns about the ongoing poor performance of Victoria's taxi industry. Its first task was to conduct the Taxi Industry Inquiry.

=== Announcement of Inquiry ===
An Inquiry into the taxi industry was announced on 28 March 2011 by Premier of Victoria, Ted Baillieu who announced that it would be headed by Professor Allan Fels, the former head of the Australian Competition & Consumer Commission.

According to Baillieu, the key problems with the Victorian taxi industry were:

- low customer satisfaction, with a sharp decline over the past five to six years
- safety and security for passengers and drivers
- insufficient support for drivers
- too many poorly-skilled drivers with inadequate knowledge
- a high turnover of drivers resulting in a shortage of experienced drivers
- complex ownership and management structures
- lack of competition
- too much of the industry revenue not being directed to the service providers – the drivers and operators.

=== Inquiry details and ongoing regulatory responsibilities ===
The Premier indicated that reforming the Victorian taxi industry would occur in two stages. In the first stage, the Fels Inquiry was to be tasked with undertaking a comprehensive inquiry into the service, safety and competition issues in the Victorian taxi industry. In the second stage, following Fels' investigation, the Taxi Services Commission was to take over the role of industry regulator with the powers and tools necessary to drive reform in the taxi industry. The Premier announced that the Taxi Services Commission was to be established as a statutory authority.

The Premier indicated that the previous taxi industry regulator, the Victorian Taxi Directorate (VTD), was to operate as normal until the Taxi Services Commission was established as the industry regulator. Staff and resources from the VTD moved to the new body when it became the ongoing industry regulator.

== Main responsibilities ==
=== Inquiry ===
The Commission was initially responsible for conducting an inquiry into the taxi industry and wider commercial passenger vehicle industry. The Commission was required to report on those matters including by making recommendations about how the commercial passenger vehicle industry should be structured and regulated.

=== Regulation ===
In its second phase, the commission was positioned as the Victorian Government's regulator of taxi services and other small commercial passenger vehicles. This role requires the STV to, among other things, administer licensing and accreditation schemes and conduct compliance and enforcement and other activities which apply to the taxi and broader small commercial passenger vehicle industries. The STV commenced as the taxi industry regulator on 1 July 2013.

Its regulations include licensing, accreditation, and background checks of drivers. In 2014, the STV sued Uber X following an investigation that found they were contravening parts of the law. The STV created a pathway for the legalisation of Uber services in Victoria in 2015. This was facilitated by a rule change that meant taxi drivers no longer needed to be affiliated with a registered network. In 2023, after waiving fees during the COVID-19 pandemic, the agency started charging fees again for accreditation, which caused many operators' licenses to lapse.

The STV is also charged with keeping data of past trips taken by taxis as a recommendation of the inquiry.

== Governance ==
=== Establishment ===
STV was established following passage of the Transport Legislation Amendment (Taxi Services Reform and Other Matters) Act 2011, which amended the Transport Integration Act 2010 to create the STV, alongside Victoria's other transport agencies, as a body corporate.

=== Constitution ===
STV consists of a Chairperson and up to two Commissioners. Professor Allan Fels was appointed as initial Chairperson to conduct the Taxi Industry Inquiry. Provision was made for staff to be engaged by the TSC. The Commissioners in the TSC's initial inquiry phase were not transitioned to manage the TSC when it assumed its role as industry regulator.

=== Legislation ===
The Transport Integration Act provides the STV with a governance framework - the objects, functions and powers - which comprise the charter of the agency.

==== Objects ====
The Transport Integration Act provided that the objects of STV in its initial inquiry phase were to:

"(a) pursue and promote major and enduring improvements in ... —

(i) the provision and accessibility of services in the commercial passenger vehicle industry;
(ii) competition in the commercial passenger vehicle industry;
(iii) innovation in the commercial passenger vehicle industry, including in the business structures, service delivery models, policies and procedures in the industry;
(iv) the safety of passengers and drivers of commercial passenger vehicles;

(b) promote public confidence in the safety of the commercial passenger vehicle industry."

==== Functions ====
The functions of STV are:

"(a) conducting an inquiry into—

(i) the structure, conduct, performance and regulation of the commercial passenger vehicle industry; and
(ii) ancillary matters related to the provision of commercial passenger vehicle services; and

(b) reporting on the outcome of the inquiry, including making recommendations about how the commercial passenger vehicle industry should be structured and regulated."

==== Desirable considerations ====
In performing its initial inquiry function, the STV was required to consider the desirability of:

- raising the standard of customer service in the commercial passenger vehicle industry
- integrating the commercial passenger vehicle industry with other forms of public transport
- improving efficiency in the commercial passenger vehicle industry
- providing education and training to drivers of commercial passenger vehicles
- ensuring that the commercial passenger vehicle industry is regulated under a performance-based regulatory framework
- improving the financial viability of the commercial passenger vehicle industry
- alternative regulatory frameworks and the potential costs (including externalities) and benefits of those frameworks
- any regulatory framework that is recommended being consistent with relevant health, safety, environmental and social requirements
- applying to the commercial passenger vehicle industry
- achieving consistency in the regulation of the commercial passenger vehicle industry between States and on a national basis
- reducing obstacles that prevent people from using commercial passenger vehicle services
- improving the quality of commercial passenger vehicle services at State borders
- promoting environmentally sustainable practices in the commercial passenger vehicle industry.

== Inquiry and reporting ==
=== Provisions triggering inquiry ===
It was not sufficient for the Commission to be established for it to conduct an inquiry. It needed to have matters formally referred to it by the Minister for Public Transport before it could commence that work. Accordingly, the Transport (Compliance and Miscellaneous) Act 1983 made provision for the Minister to issue a notice specifying the matters to be investigated, the nature of the Commission's reporting on its investigations and other relevant matters.

=== Conduct of inquiry ===
==== General ====
The STV was generally able to conduct its inquiry in the manner it considered appropriate. A number of requirements and signals were included in the legislation, however, which required initial discussions and ongoing consultations. The Commission's procedures were informal - it was not bound by the rules of evidence and was able to inform itself as it considered appropriate. In addition, the Commission was empowered to conduct hearings in public or in private and could determine whether a person could appear at a hearing and be represented by another person.

==== Powers ====
The Transport Integration Act 2010 provides the STV with a range of general corporate powers. More specific powers including those of a coercive nature are contained in the key support statute to the Transport Integration Act, the Transport (Compliance and Miscellaneous) Act 1983. Provisions include those enabling the Commission to require information and documents and those concerning the issue and tabling of reports.

==== Independence ====
The STV was independent of Ministers and Government generally in its initial inquiry phase. No provision was included for the Commission to be directed during this period thereby enabling it to operate without interference. This changed during the second phase when the Commission became subject to the standard powers of direction available to Ministers.

== See also ==
- Taxi Industry Inquiry
- Transport Legislation Amendment (Taxi Services Reform and Other Matters) Act 2011
- Transport Integration Act 2010
- Transport (Compliance and Miscellaneous) Act 1983
