= Transport law =

Area of law

Transport law (or transportation law) is the area of law dealing with transport. The laws can apply very broadly at a transport system level or more narrowly to transport things or activities within that system such as vehicles, things and behaviours. Transport law is generally found in two main areas:

- Legislation or statutory law passed or made by elected officials like Parliaments or made by other officials under delegation
- Case law decided by courts

Legislation typically consists of statutes known as Acts and delegated legislation like regulations, orders or notices. Case law consists of judgments, findings and rulings handed down by courts.

== Transport system things and activities ==
Transport laws can apply at a global transport system-wide level. A transport system can encompass a wide range of matters which make up the system. These include -

- heavy and light rail systems including associated land, infrastructure and rolling stock which comprise trains, trams and light rail vehicles
- roads including freeways, arterial roads and paths
- vehicles including cars, trucks, buses and bicycles
- ports and waterways
- commercial ships and recreational vessels
- air transport systems and aircraft.

A transport system includes not only system infrastructure and conveyances, but also things like -

- communication systems and other technologies
- strategic, business and operational plans
- schedules, timetables and ticketing systems
- safety systems
- labour components
- service components
- government decision makers like Ministers, departments, authorities, corporations, agencies and other legal persons.

The Transport Integration Act 2010 of Victoria, Australia provides an example of the use of a broad statutory formulation to circumscribe the operation of a transport law in legislative form.

Individual components can be identified from this broad transport system formulation and then regulated discreetly. For example, a bus or a car forms part of a broad transport system but are commonly regulated on an individual basis in terms of identification (registration), control of the vehicle (driver licensing and drug and blood alcohol controls), vehicle forms and fittings (vehicle standards) and other safety requirements.

== Examples of transport legislation ==
Victoria again provides an example of a jurisdiction with a suite of transport legislation which operates both at transport system and modal or activity levels.

=== System level ===
The Transport Integration Act 2010 sets out the overall policy framework for transport in Victoria. It also establishes and sets the charters of the key government agencies which make decisions affecting the planning and operation of the State's transport system and each agency is required by the statute to have regard to the policy framework.

As a general rule, transport agencies and officials do not exist in their own right and have no existence or power without conferral from a transport law. Legislation is commonly required for this purpose. Transport decision makers and agencies established and/or empowered by the Transport Integration Act 2010 include -

- key government figures such as Ministers (currently the Minister for Public Transport, the Minister for Roads and the Minister for Ports)
- a central government Department - the Department of Transport (Victoria, 2019–) - responsible for system-wide planning, integration and coordination
- a public transport agency responsible for providing or regulating train, tram, light rail, bus and taxi services - the Public Transport Development Authority
- a road agency responsible for road construction and maintenance and vehicles and towing services regulation - the Roads Corporation (VicRoads)
- agencies responsible for discrete parts of the rail system such as land, infrastructure and other assets (Victorian Rail Track (VicTrack)) and regional services (V/Line Corporation)
- agencies responsible for ports and other waters - the Port of Melbourne Corporation, the Port of Hastings Development Authority, the Victorian Regional Channels Authority and local and other authorities
- an independent transport safety regulator (Director, Transport Safety) and independent safety investigator (the Chief Investigator, Transport Safety)

The Transport Integration Act 2010 establishes these agencies and sets their statutory charters. The charters circumscribe the agencies' jurisdiction or power to operate in and to regulate their respective components of the transport system.

=== Mode or activity-based legislation ===
Victoria has a range of statutes which regulate transport modes and transport-related activities throughout the state. These include:

- the Road Management Act 2004
- the Road Safety Act 1986
- the Rail Management Act 1996
- the Rail Safety Act 2006
- the Bus Safety Act 2009
- the Bus Services Act 1995
- the Accident Towing Services Act 2007
- the Major Transport Projects Facilitation Act 2009
- the Port Management Act 1995
- the Marine Act 1988
- the Tourist and Heritage Railways Act 2010

== Case law and law from other sources ==
Areas of transport law governed by court decisions and other non transport statutes or laws include property law, contract law, torts law and specialist regulation governing the contract of carriage, and the relationship between carriers and passengers in public transport and shippers and cargo owners in shipping.

== See also ==
- Aviation law
- Bicycle law
- Traffic law
  - Traffic court
