= Taxi Industry Inquiry =

Inquiry in Victoria, Australia

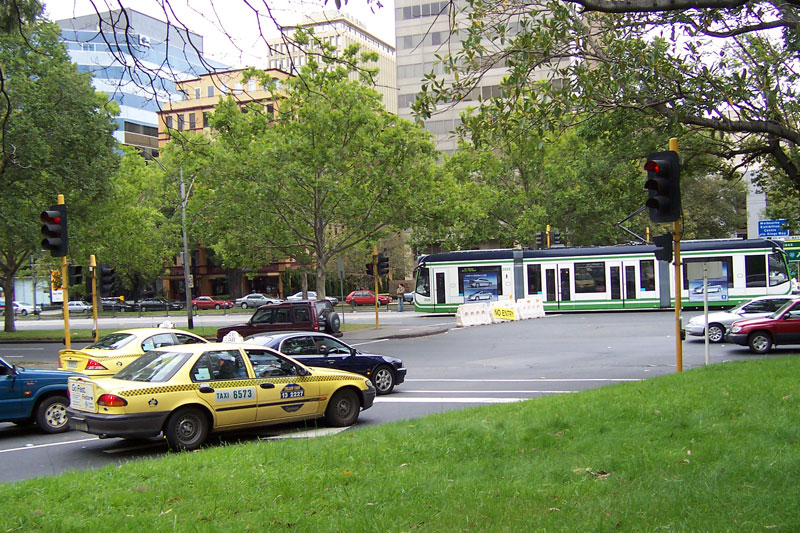
- Taxis and trams in Melbourne
- Date: 2011/12
- Location: Melbourne
- Also known as: Fels Inquiry
- Organised by: Government of Victoria
- Commissioner: Allan Fels
- Website: www.taxiindustryinquiry.vic.gov.au

The Taxi Industry Inquiry or the Fels Inquiry was an inquiry commissioned in 2011 into the taxi industry and taxi services in Victoria, Australia, by the Taxi Services Commission. The inquiry was headed by Professor Allan Fels assisted by Dr David Cousins.

== Announcement ==
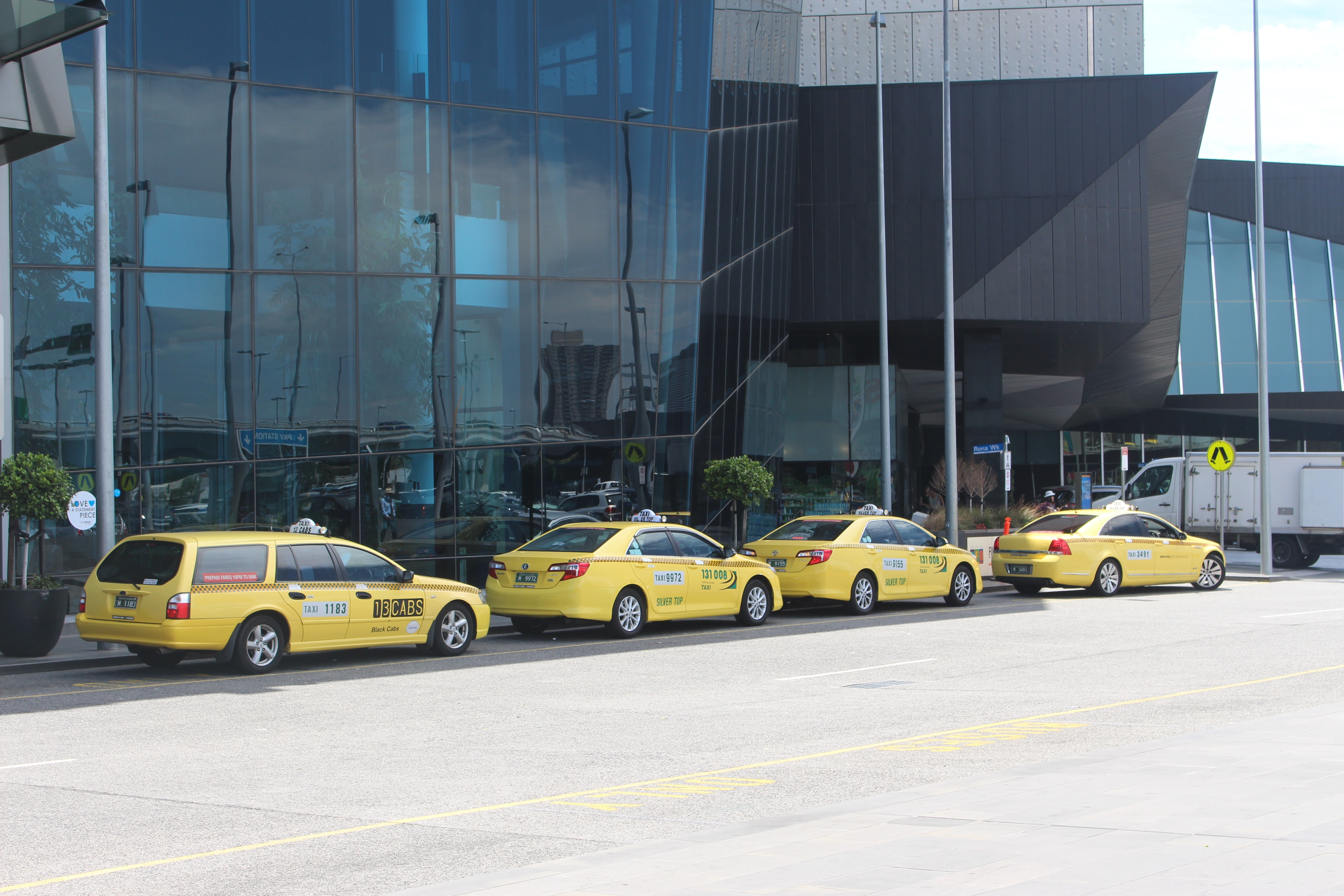
Taxi rank at the Melbourne Convention & Exhibition Centre

The Inquiry was announced on 28 March 2011 by the Premier of Victoria, Ted Baillieu. According to Bailleu, the key problems with the Victorian taxi industry were:

- low customer satisfaction, with a sharp decline over the past five to six years
- safety and security for passengers and drivers
- insufficient support for drivers
- too many poorly skilled drivers with inadequate knowledge
- a high turnover of drivers resulting in a shortage of experienced drivers;
- complex ownership and management structures
- lack of competition
- too much of the industry revenue not being directed to the service providers – the drivers and operators.

== Inquiry scope ==
Baillieu announced that Professor Fels would investigate every aspect of the current industry.

It is obvious that the current industry structure and regulation has failed. It has entrenched a lack of accountability for on-the-ground taxi services by the major industry participants. These issues are long-standing and deep-rooted and the Coalition Government has a responsibility to improve the level of service to customers who utilise the taxi industry.

— Premier Baillieu, 28 March 2011.

The Premier indicated that reforming the Victorian taxi industry would occur in two stages. In the first stage, the Fels Inquiry completed a comprehensive inquiry into the service, safety and competition issues in the Victorian taxi industry. In the second stage, a Taxi Services Commission will take over the role of industry regulator, giving it the powers and tools necessary to reform the taxi industry.

The Premier indicated that the current taxi industry regulator, the Victorian Taxi Directorate (VTD), will operate as normal until the commission was established. During the second stage staff and resources from the VTD will move to the new body as it assumes the ongoing role of regulator.

== Terms of reference ==
The terms of reference issued for the Inquiry were to review the sector and its performance against the following principles:

- customer and service focus;
- safety for passengers and drivers;
- support for and training of drivers;
- integration with other forms of public transport;
- an outcomes-based and accountable regulatory framework;
- market design that is effective, efficient and promotes competitiveness; and
- sustainability, in economic, environmental and social terms.

The overall aim of the inquiry was to instigate major and enduring improvements to service, safety and competition to Victoria's taxi and hire car industry. The inquiry should be wide-ranging and consider all point to point transport services including taxis, hire cars and other demand responsive services with a particular focus on service outcomes.

The inquiry should conduct broad ranging consultation to determine the views at all levels, including consultation with the general public and expert industry and other key stakeholders.

The inquiry will report regularly to the Minister for Public Transport and make a final report and recommendations focusing in particular on the following:

- the appropriateness of the structure of the taxi industry including the accountability of the range of industry participants with a particular focus on commercial incentives to participants including licence holders to improve services to passengers;
- service delivery and employee conditions, in particular the working conditions, training, standards and remuneration of drivers, and how these contribute to service standards and outcomes;
- competition in the sector, in particular focusing on vertical integration, anti-competitive practices and incentives for innovation;
- the effects of regulation, particularly relating to entry to the taxi market through capped licence numbers and to price controls and taxi fare setting arrangements, and how these affect customer service and innovation;
- the performance of the Multi-Purpose Taxi Program and wheelchair accessible taxis in providing service to people with disabilities and a broad range of mobility disadvantaged people;
- the current and potential role of taxis, hire cars and other demand responsive transport services in an integrated transport system, with a focus on the role of these services in social inclusion;
- options for reform including benchmarking safety and service standards, appropriate market-based, legislative and administrative solutions, and communication technology advancements that may be harnessed, to facilitate improvements in the safety, service and environmental performance;
- the appropriate regulatory and service model for long term regulation and operation of the industry, focussed on service outcomes;
- examine, evaluate and report on other models and new approaches in the taxi and hire car sectors both in Australia and overseas;
- transitional arrangements from the current regulatory and service arrangements to the recommended model; and
- any other related matters."

== State of the industry ==
The Inquiry issued an issues paper on 12 May 2011 called "Setting the Scene". The paper set out the background to the Inquiry and raised a number of issues about the performance and state of Victoria's taxi industry. The Inquiry called for public submissions in response to the paper by 24 June 2011.

The Herald Sun newspaper reported on 12 May 2011 major problems with the performance of taxi services in Melbourne under a headline "Customer satisfaction with Melbourne's taxi services hits all-time low." The Age newspaper included a similar report on 13 May 2011.

== Legislative basis ==
The Victorian Government introduced legislation in early June 2011 to provide support to the Inquiry including by establishing a statutory authority, the Taxi Services Commission, to give clear organisational separation to the Inquiry and to provide the inquiry with sufficient powers to obtain information and report to Government.

=== Minister's comments ===
Introducing the Transport Legislation Amendment (Taxi Services Reform and Other Matters) Bill 2011, the Minister for Public Transport, Terry Mulder commented that the measure -

"... sets a course for major reform of Victoria's taxi services. The Bill establishes a new Taxi Services Commission as the first phase of a complex and challenging reform process. The commission will provide the legislative basis and the powers for the comprehensive inquiry into the taxi industry that is being conducted by Professor Allan Fels, AO.

The inquiry and its broad terms of reference were announced by the Premier in March and its work is already under way. Once the inquiry has been completed, the commission will take over as the independent regulator of commercial passenger vehicles including taxi and hire cars.

Major reform of the Victorian taxi industry and its regulatory framework is desperately needed to arrest the serious ongoing decline in the standard of taxi services. In the late 1990s under the Kennett government, Victoria's taxi services compared favourably with other jurisdictions. Now, however, a once-proud taxi industry is on a downward spiral after a decade of government inaction and regulatory failure.

Victorians are fed up with the never-ending problems in the taxi industry and the appalling reduction in levels of service over recent years. This has been highlighted by the latest report of the Department of Transport's customer satisfaction monitor, which saw overall satisfaction with taxi services fall to the lowest level since the surveys began six years ago.

While many taxi operators and drivers do a good job, the problems driving customer dissatisfaction are clear: the long queues for a taxi in the Melbourne CBD and other entertainment districts on a Friday or Saturday night, drivers who do not know where to go, taxis that do not turn up, drivers who will not accept a short fare, violent incidents and unsafe behaviour.

Victorians are embarrassed when a dirty taxi or a poorly trained driver gives international visitors an unfavourable first impression of Melbourne. They are angry when they hear that taxi licences cost up to half a million dollars while taxi drivers are earning less than the minimum wage.

The Victorian public supports the need for an inquiry and will be raising many issues that have been hindering the industry's performance.

Taxis have a unique and crucial role in the transport system. They are a vital link in the public transport network, providing a flexible, point-to-point mode of transport that fills the gaps in fixed-route train, tram and bus services. In particular, taxis are the only mode of transport available to a range of groups which cannot drive a motor vehicle and cannot access other public transport services due to factors such as age, disability or where they live.

Victorians simply want to be able to get a taxi when they need one. They want the driver to know the way to their destination. They ask that the cab be clean and safe".

=== Effect of the legislation ===
The resultant Act established the Taxi Services Commission as a body corporate under the Transport Integration Act 2010 along with the other central transport bodies. The Act has four parts. Parts 2 and 3 set out the two major stages for the commission. In its first stage, the commission is conducting a comprehensive inquiry, i.e. the current Taxi Industry Inquiry. Accordingly, the Act essentially provides the commission with secure powers and authority to enable it to fulfil its task.

The Minister made a number of comments about the wide scope of the Inquiry -

"The Inquiry will cover the commercial passenger vehicle industry in its entirety. While taxis will be the focus of the Inquiry, this broad scope means that the commission is able to inquire into hire cars, restricted hire cars, special-purpose vehicles and public commercial passenger vehicles (including certain buses).

The Commission will be able inquire into the holders of commercial passenger vehicle licences, the operators of commercial passenger vehicles, providers of taxi network services, and ancillary matters such as the supply of relevant goods and services in the industry. This industry-wide approach will ensure that the commission can comprehensively address systemic failures in the conduct, performance and regulation of the industry. In its second stage, the commission will assume the role of the industry regulator and take responsibility for implementing the reforms decided by the government as a result of the Inquiry.

This Bill reflects the government's determination to ensure that Victoria once again has world-class taxi services."

== Magnitude of reform task ==
Professor Fels has indicated that the reform task in the Victorian taxi industry is substantial. He has warned that the taxi industry required a "very deep review that looks at fundamental questions about how the whole system works.

"It's not just about patching the system up with a little bit of regulation here and modification there," he said. "We need to look at an industry that is not performing well systematically."

Professor Fels said the Inquiry's "Setting the Scene" paper had received more than 140 submissions, with 40 from people with disabilities. He has reported finding disturbingly high rates of poor taxi services across Victoria. He has indicated the Inquiry would consider the cost of a taxi licence – currently about $500,000 – and whether this allowed enough access to the industry.

The industry's regulatory body, the Victorian Taxi Directorate, is also in his sights. "The whole system of regulation is on the agenda and it is also true the Government has legislated already to set up a Taxi Services Commission to come into play after our report," he said. "The VTD at the moment is a separate regulatory body we are reviewing because regulation is part of the set of problems."

== Industry reaction ==
The Victorian Taxi Association (VTA), which represents taxi networks and operators, has indicated "...support for an inquiry but not an inquisition". The Chief Executive of the VTA has commented that:

...if the inquiry is to be of any value it has to look into the VTD/DOT (the Victorian Taxi Directorate and the Department of Transport), get on with it, keep it simple and output focussed (rather than process focussed), look after the industry participants, and respect those who have built the industry – and bingo, the public will be better off.

However, the head of the Taxi Industry Inquiry, Professor Allan Fels observed that This is an industry like any other that is there to serve a customer. We're not there to service them (the industry).

== Industry issues – Cabcharge ==
One of the controversial features of the taxi industry in Australia is the influence of Cabcharge. The Taxi Industry Inquiry considered this issue as part of the Taxi Industry Inquiry and the company has been the subject of several observations by Professor Fels since the Inquiry commenced.

The Cabcharge account payment system was established in 1976 to provide a way to pay for taxi fares throughout Australia and participating countries. Cabcharge listed on the Australian Securities Exchange in December 1999. It later diversified and its key activities included technology, taxi payments and major acquisitions in the Australian bus industry through ComfortDelGro.

The company's activities are sometimes controversial and it has faced criticism at times from inquiries and regulatory bodies. Cabcharge has been the subject of recent Federal Court proceedings over alleged anti-competitive practices including predatory pricing activities and was subjected to a record high $15 million settlement for these behaviours. The company also faced criticism of profiteering for the 10% surcharge it imposed on taxi fares paid by card and the matter was later investigated by the Reserve Bank of Australia (RBA).

=== Outline ===
Cabcharge's principal activities include:

- provision of charge account facilities for businesses and individuals to enable non cash payment of taxi fares.
- development of a Point of Sale system that allows taxi users to pay their fare using third party charge, credit and debit cards and Cabcharge products. The system requires passengers to pay a 10% surcharge on their fare although the surcharge is currently being reviewed by the Reserve Bank of Australia following public comments and complaints that the surcharge is excessive.
- software development.
- provision of taxi booking and dispatch services through Taxi Networks in NSW (Combined Communications Network) and Victoria (13cabs). Additional capture of taxi owners, operators and drivers is practised through provision of services including repairs and installation of in-vehicle equipment, insurance, vehicle leasing and training.
- development of taxi-related hardware and software like taxi security camera systems, meters, and transaction processing equipment.
- provision of taxi booking and dispatch through CityFleet UK with operations in London, Edinburgh, Liverpool, Birmingham and Aberdeen in a joint venture with Singapore-based ComfortDelGro.
- operation of buses and coaches in NSW and Victoria through Cabcharge's associate ComfortDelGro Cabcharge (CDC) (of which Cabcharge owns 49%). In NSW this includes Westbus, Hillsbus, Hunter Valley Buses and Charter Plus and in Victoria, Eastrans, Westrans, Davis (Ballarat) and Benders (Geelong).

=== Concerns about Cabcharge activities ===
Cabcharge's commercial activities have been controversial at times and the company has faced regular accusations of excessive charging or profiteering and predatory and anti-competitive practices. The company was recently subject to adverse court proceedings and a major settlement arising from these behaviours.

=== 10% surcharge on taxi fares paid by card ===
Cabcharge provides EFTPOS terminals, free of charge, to approximately 97% of taxis in Australia. The company incurs the costs associated with transactions including card and other product production, in-taxi processing, administration, fraud protection and investigation, provision of statements and driver education. However, this situation also allows the company to exert substantial and anti-competitive control over most of the Australian taxi industry and to engage in profiteering activity.

Cabcharge was criticised for the 10% surcharge it collects on taxi fares paid by credit and debit cards and for the general anti-competitive control it exerts on other industry participants through its control of electronic payments and other areas of the taxi system such as vehicle and related repairs and installation of in-vehicle equipment, insurance, vehicle leasing and training. Criticism has emanated from various sources including the chair of the Taxi Industry Inquiry, Professor Fels, the former head of the Australian Competition & Consumer Commission (ACCC), and leading card companies. The 10% charge was later reviewed by the Reserve Bank of Australia.

In 2011 Professor Fels approached the Reserve Bank of Australia to help lower the 10% surcharge. He has been reported as observing monopolistic behaviours by Cabcharge.

Representatives from major credit card operators Visa and Mastercard also criticised the 10% fee:

Cabcharge was making taxi passengers pay more than 10 times the average "merchant fee" charged by banks, and five times more than the average fee charged by retailers, based on Reserve Bank data. Surcharges in the order of 10 per cent are simply excessive and way above the cost of accepting a Visa card. It's certainly more than 10 times the average Reserve Bank published cost.

— Visa spokesman, Adam Wand.

There was "no way" that credit-card processing could cost Cabcharge 10 per cent of a fare. I don't know how they can justify it. There is no question it pads out their bottom line, rather than reflecting the cost of the transaction.

— MasterCard head of strategy, David Masters.

In an article in Victoria's Herald Sun newspaper, John Legge noted that customers in that state paid at least $350 million in taxi fares with banking cards, for which 95% of Victoria's taxis use the Cabcharge system. Legge noted that the ACCC penalised Cabcharge $15 million for abusing its industry dominance.

RBA data is reported as showing that banks charge merchants an average fee of 0.81 per cent to process Visa or MasterCard payments, while the average fee passed on from the merchant to customers is 1.9 per cent for Visa and 1.8 per cent for MasterCard. The RBA considered that some companies charges are excessive and, as a result, it is drafting new rules to compel offenders to limit their charges to the costs actually incurred by merchants.

=== Taxi Industry Inquiry findings relating to Cabcharge ===
The Taxi Industry Inquiry made a number major criticisms of Cabcharge and its activities in its interim report.

==== General anti competitive conduct ====
"There are now significant anti-competitive forces at play within the industry, most notably the concentration of power with the major taxi networks and Cabcharge."

"The inquiry is concerned primarily about the effectiveness of competition in markets for payments processing and payment instruments. Over time, it appears to the inquiry that Cabcharge has been extremely effective in stifling the development of competition in these markets."

==== Predatory use of payment instruments ====
"In relation to payment instruments, if the market is defined for taxi-specific payment instruments, then Cabcharge has a very strong position in this market. It appears to have largely captured the network effects and has reenforced this by integrating into payments processing and network services."

"There is a high level of market concentration in the non-cash payment systems market with one enterprise, Cabcharge, historically holding market power in both taxispecific payment instruments and payments processing. Cabcharge is the only significant taxi-specific payments instrument, and Cabcharge estimates that its electronic payment processing system is found in approximately 97 per cent of Australian taxis, limousines and water taxis, including all – or nearly all – taxis in Victoria."

"...markets for payment instruments and processing are characterised by strong network effects. Cabcharge has been able to take advantage of these network effects by tying its branded cards to its processing facilities; that is, only Cabcharge EFTPOS terminals are permitted to process Cabcharge cards. Cabcharge has not given other payment providers access to process Cabcharge’s own cards and vouchers. As Cabcharge cards are the most widely used payment instrument, and the only significant taxi-specific payment instrument, a taxi operator that does not have the ability to process these cards will be seriously disadvantaged. This means that alternative processors face a significant barrier to establishing a market presence. Market inquiries indicate that Cabcharge branded charge account cards and eTickets account for up to 40 per cent of non-cash transactions in the taxi industry. This was a key issue that the ACCC sought to address in ACCC v Cabcharge Australia Ltd [2010] FCA 1261".

==== Predatory activities through mergers and service controls ====
"Numerous vertical mergers involving Cabcharge have been cause for concern for the ACCC over the past 15 years. Cabcharge’s acquisition of network service providers (NSPs) in Australian capital cities is considered to have given Cabcharge valuable influence over the payment systems installed in its affiliated taxis and raised barriers to entry that have protected its position in the payments system market."

"Through its NSPs, Cabcharge also provides a wide range of services to the industry, including driver training, taxi vehicle 'fit-outs', taxi cameras and meters, licence brokerage and insurance for taxi operators. It is the inquiry’s view that these activities have implications for competition in the payments services markets. More specifically, they help to maintain market power in payment instruments and payments processing: that is, Cabcharge is not likely to be seeking to 'foreclose' downstream markets by providing affiliated NSPs with lower cost access to payments services, but is seeking to make it more difficult for entrants into payments processing to provide services to taxi operators. Through this strategy, elements of the market essentially become foreclosed to other processors, making it harder for them to build scale and compete with Cabcharge. This protection of the 10 per cent surcharge is a key consideration for Cabcharge given that income from the service fee contributes around $87.3 million to its annual revenue (almost 50 per cent of the company’s total annual revenue)."

==== Observations about Cabcharge's 10% surcharge ====
"... even with the lessening of some barriers to competition – such as access to processing Cabcharge-branded cards and the removal of the MPTP-Cabcharge monopoly – the 10 per cent surcharge is likely to remain common practice. Market pressure for a reduction in the surcharge may only occur if and when taxi operators and networks effectively compete for consumers by lowering fares and the costs of associated payment methods."

"The inquiry is concerned that consumers pay excessive fees for processing electronic payments of taxi fares. The significant market power historically exercised by Cabcharge in setting its 10 per cent service fee appears to act as a 'marker' for other payments service providers. This is a particular concern in relation to general bank issued or third party payment instruments, given that average surcharges applied by merchants in other sectors are between one and four per cent."

"The lack of access to Cabcharge branded cards has also reduced competition nationwide in markets for taxi payments processing. However, the Victorian Government has little power to effect change in this area. Competition law rests in the federal domain, with the ACCC being responsible for ensuring that payments system arrangements comply with the competition and access provisions of the Commonwealth Competition and Consumer Act 2010. As discussed above, the ACCC has endeavoured to address the commercial barriers to entry in the past and continues to monitor Cabcharge’s behaviour. The inquiry supports the ACCC’s continued scrutiny of this issue."

"... the inquiry remains concerned about the 10 per cent surcharge currently imposed on Victorian taxi users. The fact that half of these fees overall are funnelled back to drivers, NSPs and operators strongly suggests that the 10 per cent is unnecessarily high and that there will be significant consumer benefit in lowering the charge to a level where these payments are minimal or eliminated."

==== Concluding criticisms about misuse of commercial power ====
"Perceptions of poor service performance, high fares and a low level of innovation are major contributors to stagnating demand for taxi services. The uneven distribution of income derived by the taxi industry also affects service quality. Licence holders benefit significantly from the scarcity of licences; others in the industry with market power, such as network service providers (NSPs) and Cabcharge, also do well. On the other hand, taxi drivers engaged by operators receive around half the wage they would be entitled to if they were treated as employees. Taxi operators who are paying fees to licence holders under assignments are also under increasing cost pressures. ... there are now significant anti-competitive forces at play within the industry, with many years of constraints on competition creating an industry mindset that is heavily focused on protecting incumbent interests, rather than seeking ways to improve services to consumers."

"NSPs generally appear to have significant market power. They have few competitors and, in many cases, have no other competitors in their allocated zones. There appear to be significant economies achieved by having larger network size, but regulation has also contributed to high market concentration. Where firms have significant market power, this may be extended into other markets by vertical integration and other vertical relationships. Of particular concern in this regard, are the links between Cabcharge and one of the major metropolitan NSPs and the extension of NSP activities to in-vehicle equipment supply."

"The inquiry’s view is that commercial barriers set up by Cabcharge are best addressed by the ACCC and the Reserve Bank of Australia, who oversee and enforce regulation of anti-competitive behaviour in payment systems markets and the efficiency of the payment systems and are best placed to ensure regulatory consistency between the states."
