= Transport law in Australia =

Transport law in Australia includes both federal and state legislation. It includes laws of carriage by road, rail, sea and air. There are laws relating to common carriers and private carriers.

== Commonwealth ==
There was a National Road Transport Commission. It was established by the National Road Transport Commission Act 1991 and continued by the National Road Transport Commission Amendment Act 1998. That commission was replaced by the National Transport Commission, created by the National Transport Commission Act 2003

The Road Transport Reform (Vehicles and Traffic) Act 1993 was repealed by Schedule 3 to the Statute Law Revision Act 2011. The Road Transport Reform (Dangerous Goods) Act 1995 was repealed by Schedule 1 to the Road Transport Reform (Dangerous Goods) Repeal Act 2009.

The Interstate Road Transport Act 1985 and the Interstate Road Transport Charge Act 1985 were repealed by Schedule 2 to the Interstate Road Transport Legislation (Repeal) Act 2018. The National Road Transport Commission Amendment Act 1992 was repealed by Schedule 1 to the Amending Acts 1990 to 1999 Repeal Act 2016.

The Commonwealth Railways Commissioner was created by the Commonwealth Railways Act 1917 (from 1975 renamed the Australian National Railways Act 1917), and replaced by the Australian National Railways Commission created by the Australian National Railways Act 1975.

The National Rail Corporation was created by the National Rail Corporation Agreement Act 1992.

== National ==
There is a Rail Safety National Law (RSNL), first passed through the South Australian Parliament on 12 May 2012. The Office of the National Rail Safety Regulator (ONRSR) administers the RSNL. The RSNL includes SFAIRP.

There is a Heavy Vehicle National Law (HVNL), first passed through the Queensland Parliament on 10 February 2014. The National Heavy Vehicle Regulator (NHVR) administers the HVNL. As of 2026, Western Australia and the Northern Territory have not adopted the HVNL. The HVNL includes the chain of responsibility.

== New South Wales ==
Legislation includes the Common Carriers Act 1902, the Traffic Act 1909, the Transport Administration Act 1988 and the Road Transport Legislation Amendment (Penalties and Other Sanctions) Act 2018.

The Road Transport Legislation Amendment (Interlock Devices) Act 2002 was repealed by section 4 of, and Schedule 3 to, the Statute Law (Miscellaneous Provisions) Act 2004. The Passenger Transport Act 1990 is prospectively repealed by section 179 of the Passenger Transport Act 2014.

Part II of the Government Railways Act 1912, made provision in relation to the Commissioners. The Transport Legislation (Repeal and Amendment) Act 1988 repealed the Government Railways Act 1912, except for Part 9 of that Act, and renamed it the Government Railways (Superannuation) Act 1912. The rest of the Act was repealed by section 4(1)(a) of the Superannuation Legislation (Amendment) 1991.

The Public Transport Commission was established by the Public Transport Commission Act 1972. RailCorp was created by amendments made by the Transport Administration Amendment (Rail Agencies) Act 2003. Schedule 1 of the Transport Administration Amendment (Transport Entities) Act 2017 inserted Part 3B of the Transport Administration Act 1988 which made provision for Sydney Trains. The Transport Administration (State Transit Authority—Fares) Order 2004 defined the CityRail area.

== Northern Territory ==
Legislation includes the Commercial Passenger (Road) Transport Act 1991, the Marine Act 1981 and the Traffic Act 1987.

== Queensland ==
Legislation includes the Transport Infrastructure Act 1994, the Transport Operations (Passenger Transport) Act 1994 and the Transport Operations (Marine Safety) Act 1994.

The State Transport Act 1960 was repealed by section 93 of, and Schedule 2 to, the Transport Operations (Road Use Management) Act 1995. The Traffic Act 1949 was repealed by section 55 of the Road Transport Reform Act 1999. The Railways Act of 1914 was repealed by section 8.10 of the Transport Infrastructure (Railways) Act 1991. The Queensland Marine Act 1958 was repealed by section 233 of, and Schedule 1 to, the Transport Operations (Marine Safety) Act 1994.

Queensland did not have and does not have an Act identical to the Carriers Act 1830 (11 Geo 4 & 1 Will 4 c 68). The concept of a common carrier by road was practically eliminated by the Carriage of Goods by Land (Carriers' Liabilities) Act of 1967. In Barron v Cyril Golding Earthmoving (1979) the court held there was no difference between common carriers and private carriers. The Carriage of Goods by Land (Carriers' Liabilities) Act of 1967 was repealed by the Carriage of Goods by Land (Carriers' Liabilities) Repeal Act 1993.

== South Australia ==
Legislation includes Motor Vehicles Act 1959 and the Railways (Operation and Access) Act 1997.

The South Australian Railways Commissioner's Act 1936 consolidated provisions relating to the South Australian Railways Commissioner, who was abolished by section 6(1) of the South Australian Railways Commissioner's Act Amendment Act 1975. These Acts, and the rest of the Railways Act 1936-1979, were repealed by section 3(b) of the State Transport Authority Act Amendment Act (No 2) 1981.

The Marine Act 1936 was repealed by paragraph 1(c) of Schedule 2 to the Harbors and Navigation Act 1993.

The Carriers Act 1891 made provision in relation to common carriers. It was repealed by section 2 of the Carriers Act Repeal Act 1999.

== Tasmania ==
Legislation includes the Common Carriers Act 1874, the Traffic Act 1925, the Transport Act 1981 and the Rail Company Act 2009.

The Railway Management Act 1935 was repealed by section 3 of the Railway Management Act (Repeal) Act 1997.

The Marine Act 1976 was repealed by section 32(1) of, and Schedule 2 to, the Port Companies Act 1997.

== Victoria ==
Legislation has included the Transport Act 1983 (No. 9921 (Vic)), the Road Safety Act 1986 and the Marine Act 1988. Amending legislation has included the Road Safety (Miscellaneous Amendments) Act 1989.

Pearce and Shepherd made a number of observations about the defects of the Transport Act 1983 and the other transport legislation in force in 2003.

The Transport Legislation Review was a legislation review project conducted in the state of Victoria, Australia. The review was policy-driven and proceeded on a modular basis. There is commentary by Pearce and Shepherd on this approach. The centrepiece of the review and now the prime transport statute in Victoria is the Transport Integration Act 2010 (No. 6 of 2010 (Vic)) which came into effect on 1 July 2010. There is commentary on the act by Pearce and Shepherd, Morris and Kinnear, Withington and Unkles. Other statutes include the Rail Safety Act 2006, the Bus Safety Act 2009 (No. 13 of 2009 (Vic)) and the Marine Safety Act 2010.

Provision in relation to tow trucks was made by division 8 of part VI of the Transport Act 1983, which was repealed by section 231 of the Accident Towing Services Act 2007 (No. 30 of 2007 (Vic)), an act that makes provision in relation to tow trucks. Other legislation has included the Transport (Tow Truck) Regulations 1983 and 1994 and the Accident Towing Services Regulations 2008.

The Major Transport Projects Facilitation Act 2009 changed planning approvals procedures for major transport projects. The Tourist and Heritage Railways Act 2010 (No. 79 of 2010 (Vic)) created a new regulatory scheme for the tourist and heritage railways sector. The Director of Marine Safety was replaced, under section 171 of the Transport Integration Act 2010, by the Director, Transport Safety.

Legislation on hoons includes the Transport Legislation Amendment (Hoon Boating and Other Amendments) Act 2009.

=== Other statutes ===
- Transport Legislation (Amendment) Act 2004
- Transport Legislation (Further Amendment) Act 2005
- Transport Legislation Amendment (Compliance, Enforcement and Regulation) Act 2010
- Transport Legislation Amendment (Ports Integration) Act 2010.

=== Regulations ===
- Transport (Infringements) Regulations 1990 (revoked)
- Transport (Passenger Vehicles) Regulations 1994 (revoked); Transport (Passenger Vehicles) Regulations 2005
- Transport (Alcohol Measurement) Regulations 2004
- Transport (Ticketing and Conduct) Regulations 2005
- Transport (Conduct) Regulations 2005
- Transport (Ticketing) Regulations 2006
- Rail Safety Regulations 2006
- Marine Regulations 2009
- Port Management (Port of Melbourne Safety and Property) Regulations 2010
- Bus Safety Regulations 2010

=== Taxis ===
- Transport (Taxi-cab Accreditation and Other Amendments) Act 2006
- Transport (Taxi-Cabs) Regulations 1994 (revoked); Transport (Taxi-cabs) Regulations 2005
- Transport (Taxi-cab Licences – Trading) Regulations 2005
- Transport (Taxi-cab Licences – Market and Trading) Regulations 2005

The Victorian Government established a Taxi Industry Inquiry in May 2011 under a new agency, the Taxi Services Commission.

== Western Australia ==
Legislation includes the Transport Co-ordination Act 1966. Railway legislation includes the Government Railways Act 1904 and the Railways (Access) Act 1998. Road traffic legislation includes the Road Traffic Act 1974.

Marine legislation includes the Western Australian Marine Act 1982. There are the Western Australian Marine (Infringements) Regulations 1985.

The Carriers Act 1920 made provision in relation to common carriers. It was repealed by section 3(1) of, and paragraph 6 of Schedule 1 to, the Statute Law Revision Act 2006.

The Taxi-car Control Act 1985 was repealed by section 46 of the Taxi Act 1994, and that act was repealed by section 303 of the Transport (Road Passenger Services) Act 2018.

== See also ==
- Transport in Australia
- Director of Public Transport
- VicRoads

== Bibliography ==
- John Livermore. Transport Law in Australia. Kluwer Law International. Third Edition. 2017. Fourth Edition. 2020. Fifth Edition. 2023.
- Gabriel Moens and Peter Gillies. "Federal Road Transport Legislation and Regulation". International Trade & Business Law & Policy. Cavendish Publishing. 1998. Reprinted 2000. ISBN 1876213256. pp 257 to 283.
- Margaret Starrs, "Towards Uniform Road Transport Laws in a Federal System" (1995) 29 Journal of Transport Economics and Policy 215
- "425 - Transport". Australian Current Law: Legislation. 1995. p 697. See also other annual volumes.
- "Acts Governing Railways and Transport". The Australian Digest.
- "Railways and other Public Transport". The Australian Digest.
- "Railways and other Public Transport". Australian Legal Monthly Digest.
- P A Leslie and M G Britt. Motor Vehicle Law in New South Wales. 1955. 3rd Edition. 1969. 4th Edition. 1975.
- N E Palmer. Bailment. Law Book Company Limited. 1979. Chapter XV (Carriage of goods by road). p 553 et seq. Chapter XVIII (Carriage by rail). Sections V to XI. pp 697 to 716.
