= Allan Fels =

Australian economist, lawyer and public servant

Professor Allan Fels AO

Chairman of the Australian Competition & Consumer Commission
- In office 1 July 1995 – 30 June 2003
- Succeeded by: Graeme Samuel

Personal details
- Born: Allan Herbert Miller Fels; 7 February 1942 (age 84) Perth, Western Australia
- Spouse: Maria-Isabel Cid (deceased 2015)
- Education: University of Western Australia; Duke University
- Occupation: Academic
- Profession: Economist

Allan Herbert Miller Fels AO (born 7 February 1942) is an Australian economist, lawyer and public servant. He was most widely known in his role as chairman of the Australian Competition & Consumer Commission (ACCC) from its inception in 1995 until 30 June 2003. Upon his retirement from the ACCC, he became foundation dean of the Australia and New Zealand School of Government (ANZSOG) until January 2013.

Fels completed his Law/Economics degree at the University of Western Australia and his PhD in Economics from Duke University. At Monash University, he was a Senior Lecturer in Economics as well as Professor of Administration and Director of the Monash Graduate School of Management.

He was made an Officer of the Order of Australia in June 2001. His book, Tough Customer: Chasing a better deal for battlers, was published in September 2019 by Melbourne University Press. Fels was awarded a Doctor of Laws (honoris causa) by the University of Melbourne in February 2022.

As of July 2026, he is an Adjunct Professor at Monash University in the Faculty of Business and Economics and as a Professorial Fellow at the University of Melbourne. He is also Chair of Mind Australia and the Public Interest Journalism Initiative.

== Family ==
Fels was married to Maria-Isabel Cid, until she died in September 2015 and has two daughters, Isabella and Teresa Fels as well as two grandons - Rafael and Marco. Australian Story ran a program on him and his family in 2002.

Government offices
Preceded by Bob Baxt	Chairman of the Australian Competition & Consumer Commission; 1995–2003	Succeeded by Graeme Samuel
