= Metlink =

Defunct marketing arm for transportation providers in Melbourne, Australia

- Type: Transportation authority
- Industry: Public transport
- Founded: 2003
- Defunct: 2 April 2012
- Fate: Merged
- Successor: Public Transport Victoria
- Headquarters: Melbourne, Victoria, Australia
- Area served: Melbourne
- Parent: Department of Transport
- Website: www.metlinkmelbourne.com.au

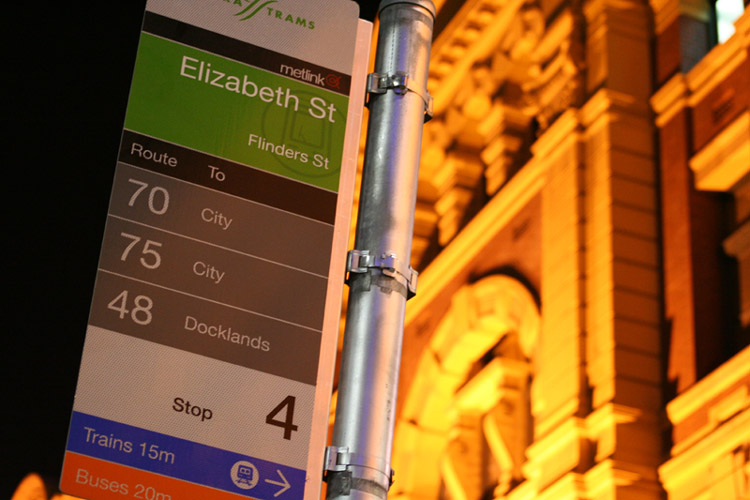
Metlink signage colour-coded by transport mode

Metlink was the marketing body and umbrella brand for public train, tram and bus transport operators in Melbourne, Australia. On 2 April 2012, the operations of Metlink were transferred to the newly created public transport planning and management authority, Public Transport Victoria.

== History ==
In 1999, the public transport system in Melbourne was disaggregated and privatised. Immediately after privatisation, there was no active system-wide branding or marketing. As a result, branding, marketing and the provision of customer information became fragmented and disjointed.

In 2003, the Victorian Government and operators joined forces to create ‘Metlink’ which provided a single identity for Melbourne's public transport system. Metlink involved the provision of integrated signage, consumer information and advertising.

== Responsibilities ==
Metlink was responsible for the promotion of travel by public transport. It published timetables, maps and guides, operated a multi-modal website, provided a journey planner, call centre, market research and data collection. Metlink also accepted and processed customer feedback, and tracked lost property.

As well as establishing a common brand for Melbourne's public transport network, the Metlink initiative was intended to better integrate information about train, tram and bus transport in Melbourne, and therefore provide passengers with better information about connecting services.

Following changes to the privatisation of Melbourne's public transport system in April 2004, the Metlink brand was transferred to a new company, Metlink Victoria Pty Ltd, the role of which was also to perform several minor functions previously performed by the State Government and the franchise operators. Metlink's ownership was then handed over to the two remaining major metropolitan operators – Yarra Trams and Connex Melbourne – the latter replaced by new train franchisee Metro Trains Melbourne in 2009. Representatives of the Bus Association of Victoria and V/Line had input into Metlink, but they did not have a controlling interest.

Metlink also had responsibility for the Revenue Clearing House, the passenger information website (formerly Victrip), the 131 638 (131 MET) telephone information service, and the public transport information centre Met Shop on Swanston Street.

== Branding ==
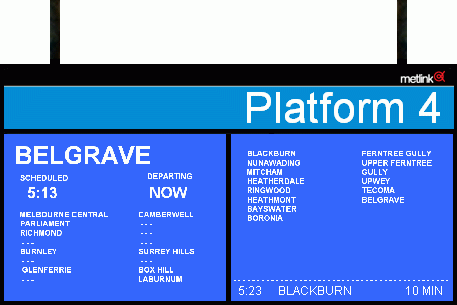
A diagram of a CRT PID screen pair

Metlink developed a master style guide for timetables, maps and other customer information, to complement the graphic design style of signage. The Metlink brand signage was implemented in 2003, with progressive replacement of the heterogeneous signage previously used by the various (some defunct) public transport operators at railway stations, tram and bus stops throughout Melbourne.

Under the Metlink branding system, railway station signage and timetables were colour-coded Blue, tram stop signs and timetables were colour-coded Green, and the bus network was colour-coded Orange. Additionally, the regional train and coach network was colour-coded Purple. This colour scheme has also been adopted by the successor public transport operator, Public Transport Victoria.

== Marketing ==
Metlink also acted as a marketing entity for public transport, and released several television advertisements. However, this was not an exclusive arrangement, as a separate set of TV advertisements was produced by former train operator Connex (featuring Sheena Easton and a trainload of passengers singing her 1980 hit Morning Train (9 to 5)) during April and May 2004. In mid-2005 Connex launched another independent print and television advertising campaign, this time focusing on its safety initiatives, and featuring Humpty Dumpty. In 2006, Connex launched a TV campaign Don't Hold Others Back focusing on encouraging courtesy on the Melbourne Rail Network.

Metlink was also active in encouraging use of "value Metcards" (pre-purchased multi-trip and periodical tickets) and ran a humorous campaign promoting this called BATBYGOBSTOPL (Buying A Ticket Before You Get On Board Saves Time Or Problems Later). In July 2007, Metlink launched a new campaign, "I Highly Recommend You Get on the Bus", featuring comedian Frank Woodley, to promote improvements in bus services and, following that, the "Take it Easy, Take the bus" campaign.

== Viclink ==
Viclink
- Type: Transportation authority
- Industry: Public transport
- Founded: 2006
- Defunct: 2 April 2012
- Fate: Merged
- Successor: Public Transport Victoria
- Headquarters: Melbourne, Victoria, Australia
- Area served: Victoria
- Parent: Department of Transport
- Website: www.viclink.com.au

Victoria's regional bus and rail services were brought under an associated brand to Metlink called Viclink. Related signage upgrades at regional railway stations began in October 2006, and were also rolled out for major regional city bus networks. The Viclink brand was subsumed by the new public transport umbrella organisation, Public Transport Victoria, on 2 April 2012.

== Legislation and governance ==
=== Transport Integration Act ===
The prime transport-related statute in Victoria is the Transport Integration Act 2010. The act established the Department of Transport as the integration agency for Victoria's transport system. The act also establishes and sets the charters of the State agencies charged with providing public transport rail services and managing network access for freight services, namely the former Director of Public Transport and V/Line. In addition, the act establishes VicTrack which owns the public rail network and associated infrastructure. Another important statute is the Rail Management Act 1996 which confers powers on rail operators and provides for an access scheme for the state's rail network.

=== Rail Safety Act ===
The safety of rail transport operations in Melbourne is regulated by the Rail Safety Act 2006 which applies to all commercial passenger operations. The Act establishes a framework containing safety duties for all rail industry participants and requires operators who manage infrastructure and rolling stock to obtain accreditation prior to commencing operations. Accredited operators are also required to have a safety management system to guide their operations. Sanctions applying to the safety scheme established under the Rail Safety Act are contained in the Transport (Compliance and Miscellaneous) Act 1983. The safety regulator for the rail system in Melbourne including trams is the Director, Transport Safety (trading as Transport Safety Victoria) whose office is established under the Transport Integration Act 2010.

=== Ticketing and conduct ===
Ticketing requirements for trains, trams and buses in Melbourne are mainly contained in the Transport (Ticketing) Regulations 2006 and the Victorian Fares and Ticketing Manual. Rules about safe and fair conduct on trains, trams and buses in Melbourne are generally contained in the Transport (Compliance and Miscellaneous) Act 1983 and the Transport (Conduct) Regulations 2005.

== See also ==
- Rail transport in Victoria
- Railways in Melbourne
- Trams in Melbourne
- Buses in Melbourne
- Transport Legislation Review
- Director of Public Transport
- Public Transport Victoria
- Department of Transport
- Transport (Compliance and Miscellaneous) Act 1983
