= Department of Environment, Land, Water and Planning =

Department of the state government of Victoria, Australia

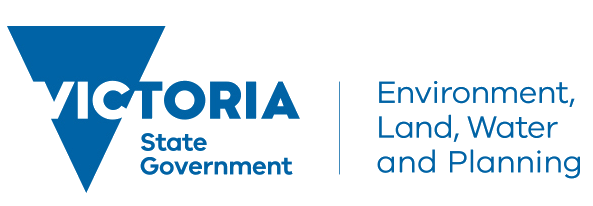

Department overview
- Formed: 1 January 2015
- Preceding agencies: Department of Environment and Primary Industries; Department of Transport, Planning and Local Infrastructure
- Dissolved: 31 December 2022
- Superseding agencies: Department of Energy, Environment and Climate Action; Department of Transport and Planning
- Jurisdiction: Victoria, Australia
- Headquarters: 8 Nicholson Street, East Melbourne, Victoria 3002
- Ministers responsible: Lily D'Ambrosio, Minister for Energy, Minister for Environment and Climate Action & Minister for Solar Homes; Harriet Shing, Minister for Water; Lizzie Blandthorn, Minister for Planning
- Department executive: John Bradley, Secretary
- Website: delwp.vic.gov.au

The Department of Environment, Land, Water and Planning (DELWP) was a government department in Victoria, Australia.

Commencing operation in January 2015, the DELWP was created in the aftermath of the 2014 state election, with Premier Daniel Andrews announcing that the previous Department of Environment and Primary Industries (DEPI) would be renamed. The newly formed DELWP subsequently assumed property and land titles, planning and local government portfolios from the previous Department of Transport, Planning and Local Infrastructure, whilst responsibilities for agriculture were transferred to the Department of Economic Development, Jobs, Transport and Resources.

The department was responsible for various matters related to the environment, energy and planning. On 1 January 2023, planning functions were transferred to the Department of Transport and Planning and DELWP was renamed to Department of Energy, Environment and Climate Action.

== Functions ==
The DELWP had responsibility for the following policy areas:

- Environment
- Energy
- Wildlife
- Heritage
- Climate change
- Waste and resource recovery
- Planning
- Marine and coasts
- Planning
- Property and land titles
- Water and catchments
- Forest Fire Management Victoria (an agency for Bush firefighting)
