= Jeroen Weimar =

Dutch-born British-Australian public servant

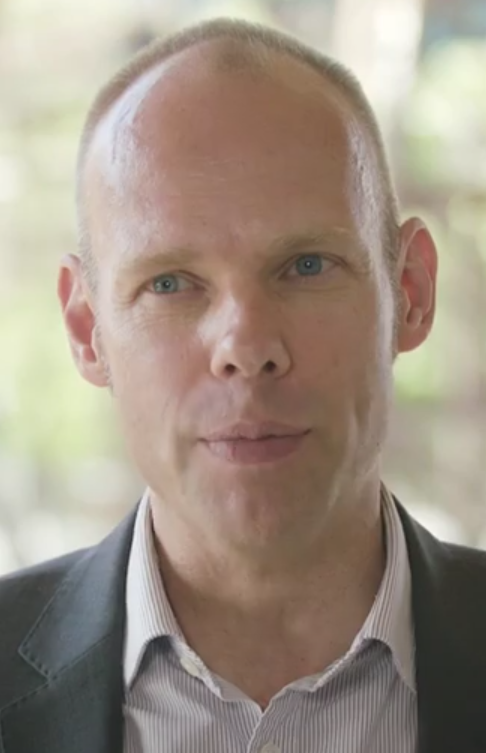
- Weimar in 2018
- Born: 1968 or 1969 (age 57–58); Netherlands
- Education: London School of Economics
- Occupations: Bureaucrat, urban planner

Jeroen Weimar is a Dutch-born British-Australian public servant. He is best known in the Australian state of Victoria for his leadership roles in Public Transport Victoria, the Victorian government's COVID-19 response, and the Victorian 2026 Commonwealth Games Organising Committee. He is currently the secretary of the Victorian Department of Transport and Planning.

== Early life ==
Weimar was born in the Netherlands, and raised in the United Kingdom. He earned degrees in economics and urban planning at the London School of Economics.

== Career ==
Weimar began his career in the United Kingdom, working for organisations including the British Transport Police Authority, the Greater London Authority, and KPMG. He joined Transport for London (TfL) in 2001, and worked there for more than nine years. By 2008, when London Mayor Boris Johnson announced a ban on drinking alcohol on public transport, Weimar was working as TfL's Director of Transport Policing and Enforcement. Weimar went on to serve as the chief operating officer of FirstGroup.

Weimar relocated to the Australian state of Victoria after he was successful in his application to join Public Transport Victoria (PTV), of which he was appointed CEO following the departure of Mark Wild in September 2016 (acting since January 2016) and then subsequently VicRoads. Weimar served in that position until July 2019, when PTV and VicRoads merged with the Department of Transport, at which point he was appointed the department's head of transport services. Weimar resigned from the Department in March 2020, after the transport portfolio was reorganised and struggled with the role having to deal with the combination of VicRoads with PTV.

During the COVID-19 pandemic in Victoria, Weimar was called back to the Victorian public service to manage COVID-19 transport protocols. He was employed in July 2020 to oversee Victoria's then-struggling COVID-19 response unit and its contact tracing operations. In that role, he regularly appeared in televised COVID-19 updates alongside Victorian premier Daniel Andrews. By July 2021, he was being regarded as a "side-kick" to the premier, standing with other public figures who made regular media appearances during Melbourne's strict COVID-19 lockdowns, including Andrews, Brett Sutton and Jenny Mikakos.

In April 2022, Weimar stepped down from his role as Victoria's COVID-19 response commander. Following speculation, in June 2022 he was appointed chief executive of the organising committee for the 2026 Commonwealth Games which, at the time, were planned to be held in several cities in the state of Victoria. Weimar was removed due to his role being made redundant in July 2023 when Premier Daniel Andrews announced the cancellation of the Victorian Games due to poor management and significant increases in the projected cost.

In February 2024, he was appointed to lead Victoria's major housing strategy to help the State manage the housing crisis. The appointment was criticised by the state opposition leader. from a number of quarters.

In December 2024, it was announced that Weimar had been appointed secretary of the Victorian Department of Transport and Planning (DTP), commencing on 27 January 2025, marking a return to the area he worked in when he first went to Victoria.

Weimar departed DTP on 28 August 2026. Fiona Adamsom replaced Weimar at DTP on the same day.

== Personal life ==
Weimar enjoys road cycling. He and his family are active members of the Sandringham Surf Life Saving Club, of which he was vice president until July 2021.
