= Melbourne Rail Link =

Underground rapid transit project in Melbourne, Australia

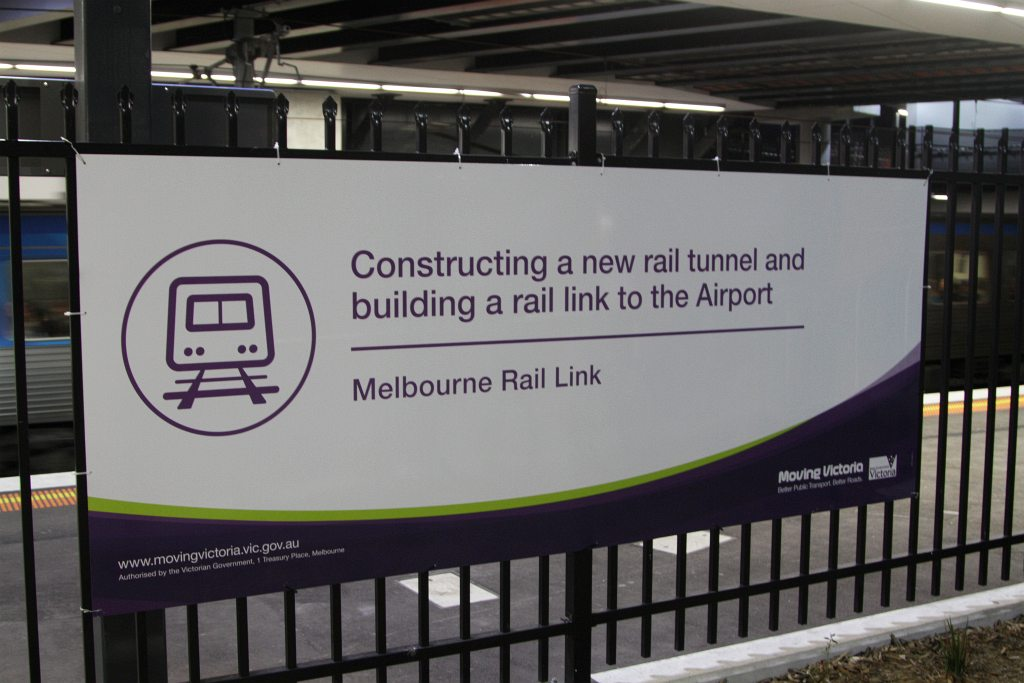
- Melbourne Rail Link promotional signage at Footscray station in July 2014

Overview
- Status: Cancelled
- Locale: Melbourne, Victoria, Australia
- Termini: Southern Cross; South Yarra
- Stations: 4
- Website: Official website

Service
- Type: Rapid transit Suburban rail
- System: Melbourne rail network
- Services: Lilydale; Belgrave; Alamein; Frankston

Technical
- Line length: 6–7 km (3.7–4.3 mi)
- Number of tracks: 2
- Character: Underground
- Track gauge: 1,600 mm (5 ft 3 in) Victorian broad gauge

The Melbourne Rail Link was a proposed twin 6 to 7 kilometre (3.72 to 4.34 mi) rail tunnels between Southern Cross and South Yarra with four new underground stations at South Yarra, Domain and Fishermans Bend (Montague) and Southern Cross Station. The tunnel would have connected the Belgrave, Lilydale and Alamein lines with the Frankston line enabling the operational separation of various existing lines on Melbourne's rail network and increase the capacity of the system to metro-style frequencies.

Following a change in State Government due to the state election, the project was cancelled and the previous Metro Tunnel proposal was reinstated.

== Proposal ==
In February 2014, the state government announced that it was considering alternative alignments for Metro Tunnel, because of concerns that cut and cover construction in Swanston Street would result in a massive disruption to traffic and retail activity for an extended period of time. At the launch of its 2014 budget, the Napthine government announced that the Metro Tunnel project would be abandoned and replaced with an alternative proposal called the "Melbourne Rail Link". The MRL route consisted of a tunnel from South Yarra to Southern Cross via Kings Domain and Fishermans Bend, where it would join existing City Loop tunnels reconfigured for bidirectional traffic. Furthermore, the government promised that the realignment would enable a Melbourne Airport rail link to be constructed from Southern Cross at the same time. Ultimately, the reconfiguration of the rail network was to have produced similar operational outcomes as the Melbourne Metro plan, with a Sunbury-Dandenong corridor operating directly between Southern Cross and Flinders Street in both directions, but with an additional end-to-end line from Frankston to Ringwood via the new tracks.

According to government ministers, the Melbourne Rail Link offered greater capacity increases and less disruption during the construction phase than existing plans. However, it was heavily criticized, including by Lord Mayor of Melbourne Robert Doyle, who described the route change as a potential "100-year catastrophe" because of its failure to service the Parkville medical and research precinct. Furthermore, the government revealed in the days following the budget that it had not produced a business case for its plan, and that the decision had been taken primarily on the basis of a "common sense" need to service its urban redevelopment project at Fishermans Bend. Other concerns emerged in the months following the budget, with experts publicly questioning whether the Napthine government had committed sufficient funding, and whether the proposed tunnels could be engineered to successfully avoid the main Melbourne sewer.

== Cancellation ==
By November, with the state election approaching, the rail tunnel had become a major point of contention in the campaign, with the government prioritising the East West Link (EWL) road tunnel rather than the rail tunnel. Then Labor opposition leader Daniel Andrews promised that "under no circumstances" would it build the EWL if elected. As an alternative, Labor proposed reinstating the original Metro Tunnel plan, which retained the support of senior public servants in the Department of Transport, Planning and Local Infrastructure. According to their analysis, the original tunnel route performed substantially better than the EWL in a cost-benefits analysis, but no such calculation had been performed for the new Melbourne Rail Link. Labor won the election, hence the Melbourne Rail Link project was cancelled and the previous Metro Tunnel proposal was reinstated and progressed with the project having opened in 2025 and full operation having begun in early 2026.
