= Road Construction Authority =

Statutory Authority overview
- Formed: 1 July 1983
- Preceding Statutory Authority: Country Roads Board
- Dissolved: 30 June 1989
- Superseding Statutory Authority: VicRoads
- Jurisdiction: Victoria, Australia
- Headquarters: Kew, Victoria
- Employees: 3,984 (June 1989)
- Annual budget: $611 million (1988/89)
- Minister responsible: Minister for Transport
- Statutory Authority executive: Ian Stoney, Chairman & Managing Director
- Agency ID: PROV VA 1054

The Road Construction Authority was a government authority responsible for the construction and maintenance of main roads in the state of Victoria, Australia between 1983 and 1989.

== History ==
The Road Construction Authority (RCB) was formed to take over responsibility from the Country Roads Board for the care and management of the 24,000 kilometres of main roads of the state. The Age observed that the Cain government's formation of the RCA was part of a "radical reorganisation" of the state's transport bureaucracy, reducing the long-standing autonomy of public sector bodies and bringing them closer to ministerial control.

The RBC was abolished on 30 June 1989 when it and the Road Traffic Authority merged to form VicRoads.

== Publication ==
Roads, Victoria was the in house magazine of the RCB.
