= Department of Transport and Planning =

Government department in Victoria, Australia

- Logo since January 2023

Department overview
- Formed: 1 January 2019
- Preceding agencies: Department of Economic Development, Jobs, Transport and Resources; Public Transport Victoria
- Jurisdiction: Victoria, Australia
- Employees: 3,979 (June 2020)
- Annual budget: $9.1 billion (FY 19–20)
- Ministers responsible: Vicki Ward, Minister for Public Transport; Melissa Horne, Minister for Ports and Freight; Paul Hamer, Minister for Roads and Road Safety
- Department executive: Jeroen Weimar, Secretary
- Website: vic.gov.au/department-transport-and-planning

The Department of Transport and Planning (DTP) is a government department in Victoria, Australia. Commencing operation on 1 January 2019 as the Department of Transport (DOT), the DOT was formed in machinery of government changes made by Premier Daniel Andrews after the re-election of his Labor government at the 2018 Victorian state election. The re-shuffle saw the "super-ministry" Department of Economic Development, Jobs, Transport and Resources abolished and its functions reassigned to the DOT and Department of Jobs, Precincts and Regions.

The department is responsible for ongoing operation and coordination of the state's transport networks, as well as the delivery of new and upgraded transport infrastructure. As part of a major restructure of the legislative and organisational structure of the state's transport sector between 2019 and 2022, the department absorbed the statutory responsibilities and staff of the formerly independent agencies VicRoads and Public Transport Victoria, and from 2024 began providing public-facing transport information under the brand Transport Victoria.

On 1 January 2023, after the 2022 Victorian state election, the department absorbed the planning functions of Department of Environment, Land, Water and Planning and was given its current name.

The DTP supports three ministers, holding three ministerial portfolios: Minister for Ports and Freight Melissa Horne, Minister for Public Transport Vicki Ward and Minister for Roads and Road Safety Paul Hamer

== History ==
=== Background ===
Transport in Victoria has been managed by various government departments across different ministries. Following each state election, the Premier issues a Machinery of Government instrument, outlining how government responsibilities will be overseen by ministers and the organisation of the bureaucracy.

The first Victorian government agency with a unified approach to transport planning was the Ministry of Transport, formed in 1951 as the earliest precursor to the current DOT. Renamed as the 'Department of Transport' in 1996, the agency underwent numerous changes in organisational structure. Transport responsibilities were merged under the Department of Infrastructure under the Kennett Government until the second incarnation of the Department of Transport was formed in 2008.

The department was replaced by Department of Transport, Planning and Local Infrastructure in April 2013, and then the Department of Economic Development, Jobs, Transport and Resources in January 2015. Further changes were announced with the establishment of Transport for Victoria in June 2016 to provide a "new central transport agency to coordinate Victoria's growing transport system and plan for its future".

=== Establishment ===
After the November 2018 re-election of the Andrews government, machinery of government changes divided the functions of the Department of Economic Development, Jobs, Transport and Resources into two new departments. The Department of Transport absorbed all of the former department's transport functions. Jacinta Allan, who had been public transport minister in the previous structure, was promoted to a new role of Minister for Transport Infrastructure to lead the new department's focus on major road and rail projects.

The new department was formally established on 1 January 2019, with Paul Younis as acting Secretary. On 26 March, he was confirmed as a permanent appointment to the position. As Secretary, Younis also held the position of acting Head, Transport for Victoria, an office established under section 64A of the Transport Integration Act 2010.

In the days following Younis' permanent appointment, the government announced a major restructure of its transport agencies, with statutory authorities VicRoads and Public Transport Victoria to be abolished as independent entities and incorporated into the Department of Transport. Government ministers claimed that the merger was a more modern approach to integrated transport planning; however, media reports and the state Opposition suggested that the changes were an attempt to reduce transparency and obscure cost overruns on major projects. The move received support from the Rail, Tram and Bus Union, but was opposed by the Australian Services Union, representing many VicRoads staff. The Public Transport Users Association offered its cautious support for the changes, saying that although integration of planning functions was a positive, the merger risked creating an entrenched and inaccessible bureaucracy.

The restructure took effect on 1 July 2019. All functions of the PTV and VicRoads were transferred to the Department of Transport, with the exception of VicRoad's registration and licensing functions and some heavy vehicle functions.

=== Planning functions ===
After the Andrews government was re-elected at the 2022 Victorian state election, the planning functions of the Department of Environment, Land, Water and Planning were merged into the DOT on 1 January 2023, and the department was renamed to the Department of Transport and Planning.

== Ministers ==
As of April 2026, the DTP supports four ministers in the following portfolios:

Name	Party	Portfolio
Gabrielle Williams	Labor	Minister for Transport Infrastructure; Minister for Public and Active Transport
Melissa Horne	Labor	Minister for Ports and Freight; Minister for Roads and Road Safety
Harriet Shing	Labor	Minister for Suburban Rail Loop
Sonya Kilkenny	Labor	Minister for Planning

== Functions ==
The DTP had responsibility for the following policy areas:

- Public transport, including:
  - Metropolitan trains
  - Trams
  - Buses
  - Regional transport
- Roads
- Taxi industry and other commercial passenger vehicles
- Maritime affairs
- Transport infrastructure
- Road safety
- Walking and cycling
- Planning (since January 2023)
- Property and land titles (since January 2023)

== Agencies ==
=== Sector transport agencies ===
- V/Line
- Commercial Passenger Vehicles Victoria
- Port of Hastings Corporation
- Ports Victoria
- VicTrack
- Transport Safety Victoria
- Road Safety Victoria
- Transport for Victoria

Public Transport Development Authority was also an agency of DOT until its abolition in July 2019. On 6 August 2025, public transport information provided by PTV was moved into 'Transport Victoria'.

Road Safety Victoria was formed in August 2019.

Transport for Victoria was originally created in 2017 as an umbrella agency for both VicRoads and Public Transport Victoria, to promote the concept of an integrated transport network. These responsibilities were taken over directly by Department in 2019. Transport for Victoria continues to exist as the statutory office of Head, Transport for Victoria, which serves as a separate legal person from The Crown and has several duties relating to contracts and ownership of assets. The position of Head, Transport for Victoria has been held by the secretary of the Department of Transport and Planning since 2019, and is currently secretary Jeroen Weimar.

=== Victorian Infrastructure Delivery Authority ===
Victorian Infrastructure Delivery Authority
Authority overview
- Formed: 2 April 2024
- Preceding agencies: Major Transport Infrastructure Authority; Victorian Health Building Authority
- Type: Administrative office
- Jurisdiction: Victoria, Australia
- Employees: 2,030 (June 2020)
- Minister responsible: Danny Pearson, Minister for Transport and Infrastructure
- Authority executive: Kevin Devlin, Director-General
- Website: bigbuild.vic.gov.au

The Major Transport Infrastructure Authority (MTIA) was established on 1 January 2019 as an administrative office of the DOT, replacing the former independent administrative offices governing various infrastructure projects. It is led by Director-General Kevin Devlin who is responsible to the Minister for Transport and Infrastructure, Danny Pearson. MTIA was declared a transport body under the Transport Integration Act 2010 in August 2019. On 2 April 2024, the MTIA merged with Victorian Health Building Authority (VHBA) to form Victorian Infrastructure Delivery Authority (VIDA) and includes health infrastructure such as hospitals in its scope.

Project teams within the VIDA (and previously MITA) are:

- Level Crossing Removal Project – formerly Level Crossing Removal Authority before 2019
  - The project team also includes the Regional Rail Revival and Melbourne Airport Rail, which were previously part of Rail Projects Victoria (RPV) until April 2024
- Major Road Projects Victoria – formerly Major Road Projects Authority before 2019
  - The project team also includes the North East Link Project and West Gate Tunnel Project, which were their own project teams within MITA until 2023. Both former project teams were previously North East Link Authority, Western Distributor Authority and West Gate Tunnel Authority before 2019
- Metro Tunnel Project – formerly Rail Projects Victoria until April 2024 and previously Melbourne Metro Rail Authority before 2019
- Victorian Health Building Authority – previously its own independent authority until formation of VIDA

=== Suburban Rail Loop Authority ===
Suburban Rail Loop Authority
Authority overview
- Formed: 3 September 2019
- Type: Administrative office
- Jurisdiction: Victoria, Australia
- Employees: 352 (June 2022)
- Minister responsible: Danny Pearson, Minister for the Suburban Rail Loop
- Authority executive: Frankie Carroll, CEO
- Website: suburbanrailloop.vic.gov.au

The Suburban Rail Loop Authority (SRLA) was established in September 2019 as an administrative office of the DOT. It coordinates and plans the delivery of Suburban Rail Loop. The authority became an independent statutory authority on 1 December 2021.
