= Department of Economic Development, Jobs, Transport and Resources =

Government organization in Melbourne, Victoria, Australia

Department overview
- Formed: 1 January 2015
- Preceding agencies: Department of Transport, Planning and Local Infrastructure; Department of Environment and Primary Industries
- Dissolved: 31 December 2018
- Superseding agencies: Department of Transport; Department of Jobs, Precincts and Regions
- Jurisdiction: State of Victoria, Australia
- Headquarters: Melbourne
- Ministers responsible: Jacinta Allan, Minister for Public Transport, Minister for Major Projects; Philip Dalidakis, Minister for Small Business, Innovation and Trade; Luke Donnellan, Minister for Roads and Road Safety, Minister for Ports; John Eren, Minister for Tourism and Major Events; Martin Foley, Minister for Creative Industries; Natalie Hutchins, Minister for Industrial Relations; Wade Noonan, Minister for Industry and Employment, Minister for Resources; Jaala Pulford, Minister for Agriculture, Minister for Regional Development
- Department executive: Richard Bolt, Secretary
- Website: economicdevelopment.vic.gov.au
- Agency ID: PROV VA 5034

The Department of Economic Development, Jobs, Transport and Resources (DEDJTR) is a former department of the Government of Victoria. It was created on 1 January 2015 by the government of Premier Daniel Andrews when the number of government departments was reduced from 9 to 7, and assumed responsibility for ministerial portfolios previously spread across 5 departments. It was abolished at the end of 2018 and divided into two new departments.

== Governance and history ==
The department was established after the 2014 Victorian state election by the new Labor government, using the powers of the Premier of Victoria and the Governor-in-council under the Public Administration Act 2004 and the Administrative Arrangements Act 1983. Its establishment was part of a reorganisation of the Victorian public sector which combined the functions of 9 departments into 7, following a similar process after the 2010 election which reduced the number of departments from 11 to 9. The new department absorbed all the functions of the Department of State Development, Business and Innovation; the agricultural, forestry and fisheries operations of the Department of Environment and Primary Industries; the transport responsibilities of the Department of Transport, Planning and Local Infrastructure; and the Industrial Relations Victoria and Arts Victoria agencies from the Department of Treasury and Finance and the Department of Premier and Cabinet respectively.

An inquiry into the changes was launched by the Legal and Social Issues Committee of the Victorian Legislative Council in 2015. The inquiry was told that the new, larger department was better able to collaborate and promote "liveability" through its functions.

On 29 November 2018, following the re-election of the Labor Party in the 2018 Victorian state election, it was announced that DEDJTR would be broken up into two new departments: a Department of Transport and a Department of Jobs, Precincts and Regions. The changes took effect on 1 January 2019.

== Overview ==
The department supports the following 11 ministerial portfolios and their corresponding agencies:

- Agriculture
  - Agriculture Victoria Services
  - Biosciences Research Centre Joint Venture Board
  - Dairy Food Safety, Victoria
  - Game Management Authority
  - Geoffrey Gardiner, Dairy Foundation
  - Greater Sunraysia Pest Free Area Industry Development Committee
  - Melbourne Market Authority
  - Murray Valley Wine Grape Industry Development Committee
  - PrimeSafe
  - Royal Melbourne Showgrounds Joint Venture Board
  - VicForests
  - Victorian Strawberry Industry Development Committee
  - Veterinary Practitioners Registration Board of Victoria
- Creative Industries
  - Arts Centre Melbourne
  - Australian Centre for the Moving Image
  - Docklands Studios Melbourne
  - Film Victoria
  - Geelong Performing Arts Centre
  - Melbourne Recital Centre
  - Museum Victoria
  - National Gallery of Victoria
  - State Library of Victoria
- Employment
- Energy and Resources
- Industry
- Ports
  - Port of Hastings Development Authority
  - Port of Melbourne Corporation
  - Victorian Regional Channels Authority
  - Victorian Ports Corporation
- Public Transport
  - Chief Investigator, Transport Safety
  - Level Crossing Removal Authority
  - Melbourne Metro Rail Authority
  - Public Transport Victoria
  - Taxi Services Commission
  - Transport Safety Victoria
  - V/Line Corporation
  - VicTrack
- Regional Development
  - Regional Development Victoria
- Roads and Road Safety
  - Transport Accident Commission
  - VicRoads
- Small Business, Innovation and Trade
  - Launch Victoria
  - Office of the Small Business Commissioner
- Tourism and Major Events
  - Australian Grand Prix Corporation
  - Emerald Tourist Railway Board
  - Federation Square Pty Ltd
  - Melbourne and Olympic Parks Trust
  - Melbourne Convention and Exhibition Trust
  - Melbourne Cricket Ground Trust
  - Visit Victoria

The department secretary was Richard Bolt, brother of journalist Andrew Bolt, previously head of the Department of Environment and Primary Industries.
