= Department of Transport (Victoria, 2008–2013) =

Former government agency of Victoria, Australia

Department overview
- Formed: 2008
- Preceding Department: Department of Infrastructure
- Dissolved: April 2013
- Superseding Department: Department of Transport, Planning and Local Infrastructure
- Jurisdiction: Victorian Government
- Website: http://www.transport.vic.gov.au
- Agency ID: PROV VA 4853

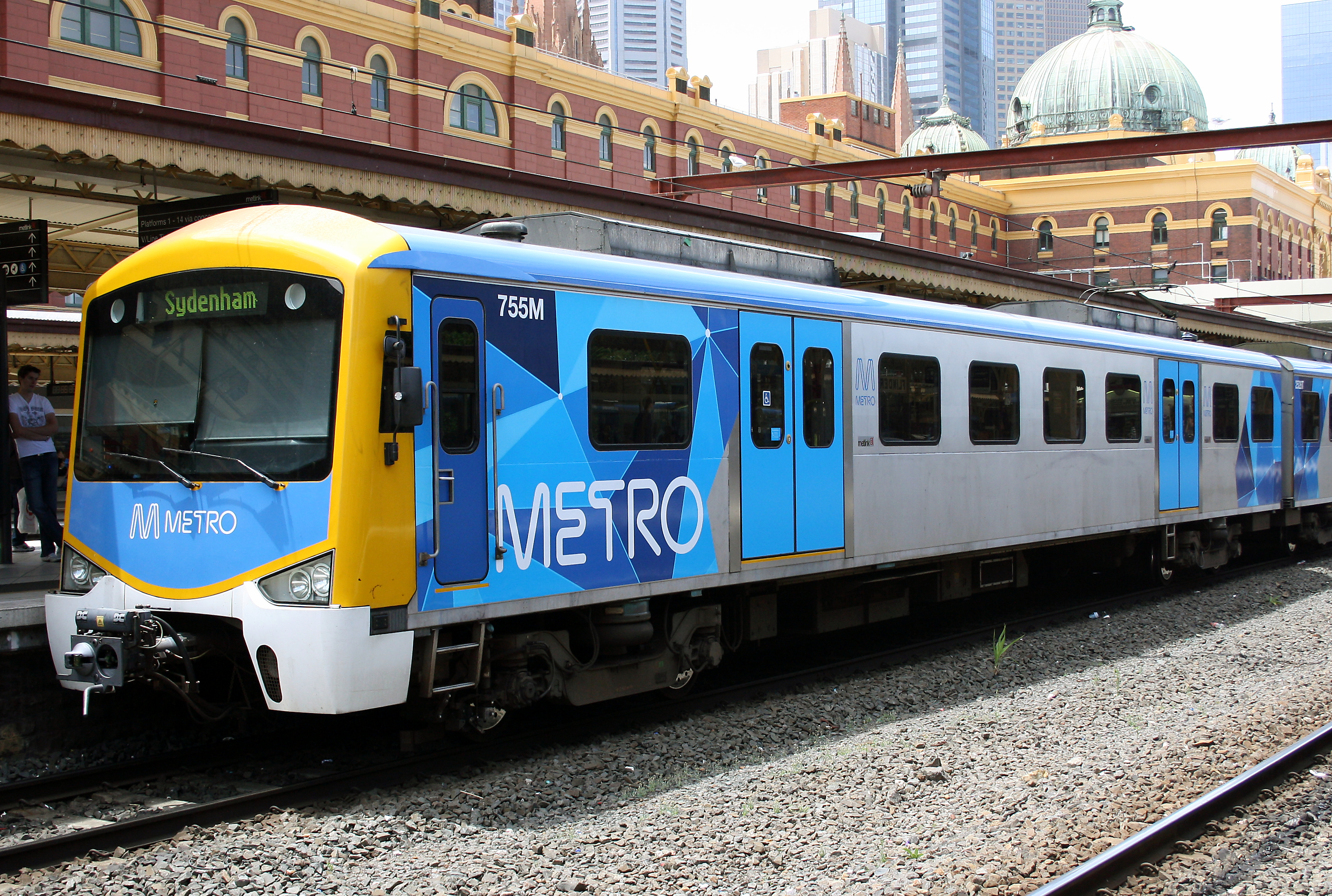
Metro Trains Melbourne set 755M in Metro livery, part of the suburban train fleet in Melbourne. The Department of Transport was responsible for planning, policy, and legislation for the transport system in Victoria. As a result, the department drove the integration of Victoria's transport land and water transport systems and the delivery of public transport, road and port services and associated activities across the State.

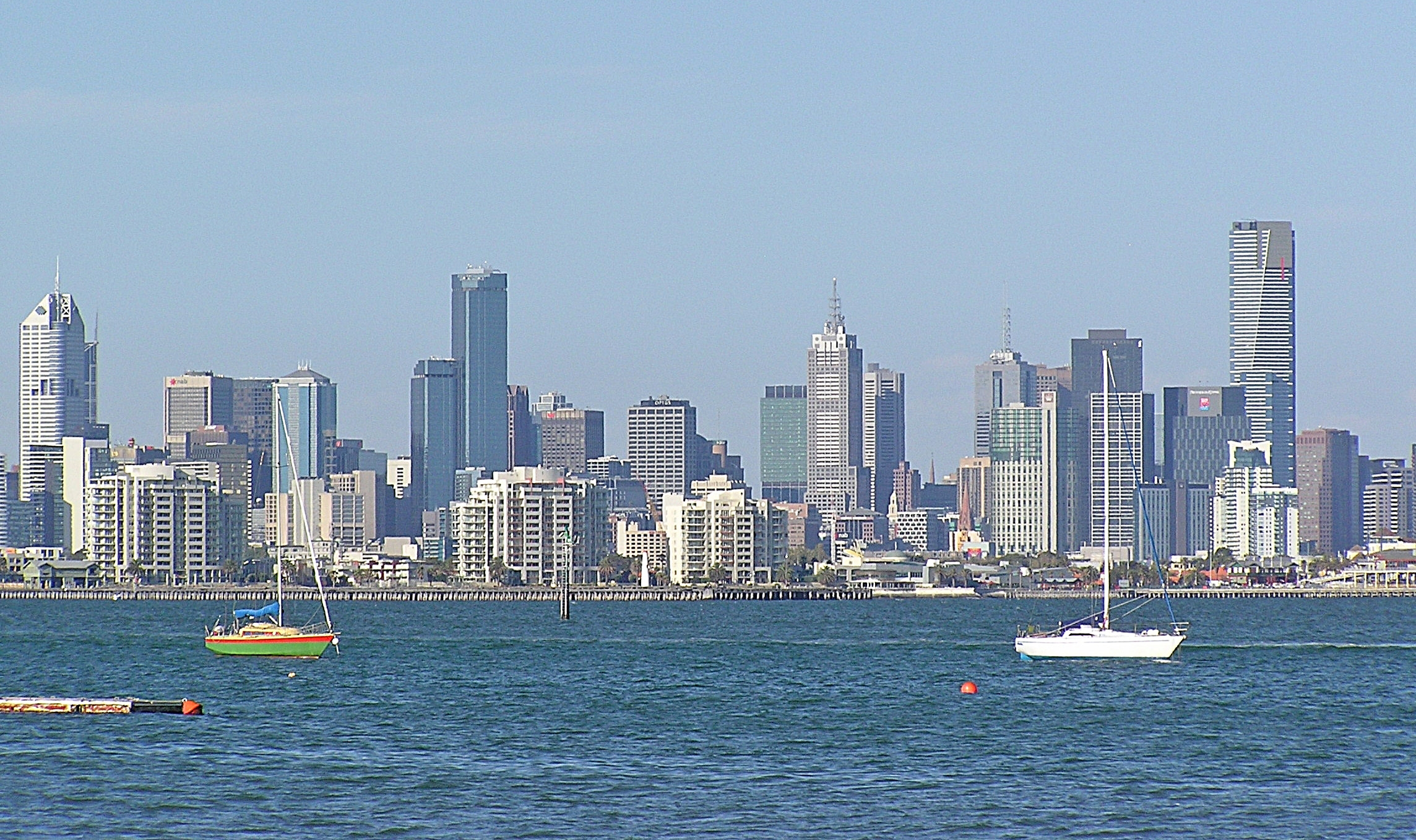
Recreational boating in Port Phillip Bay in Melbourne with the city in the background. Melbourne, the state capital, is home to more than seven in ten Victorians.

The Department of Transport (DOT) was the government agency responsible for the coordination, integration and regulation of the transport system in the State of Victoria, Australia. The department generated planning, policy, and legislation for transport in Victoria. As a result, the department drove the integration of Victoria's transport land and water transport systems and the delivery of public transport, road and port services and associated activities across the State. The department's stated mission was "Building a safer, fairer and greener transport system for all Victorians to create a more prosperous and connected community."

The DOT was abolished and its functions absorbed by the new Department of Transport, Planning and Local Infrastructure in April 2013.

== Ministerial portfolios ==
At the time of its abolition, the Department of Transport supported three Ministerial portfolios, the Minister for Public Transport, the Minister for Roads (the Hon Terry Mulder MLA) and the Minister for Ports (the Hon David Hodgett MLA). It also supported one Parliamentary Secretary for Transport (Mr Gary Blackwood MLA).

== Governance ==
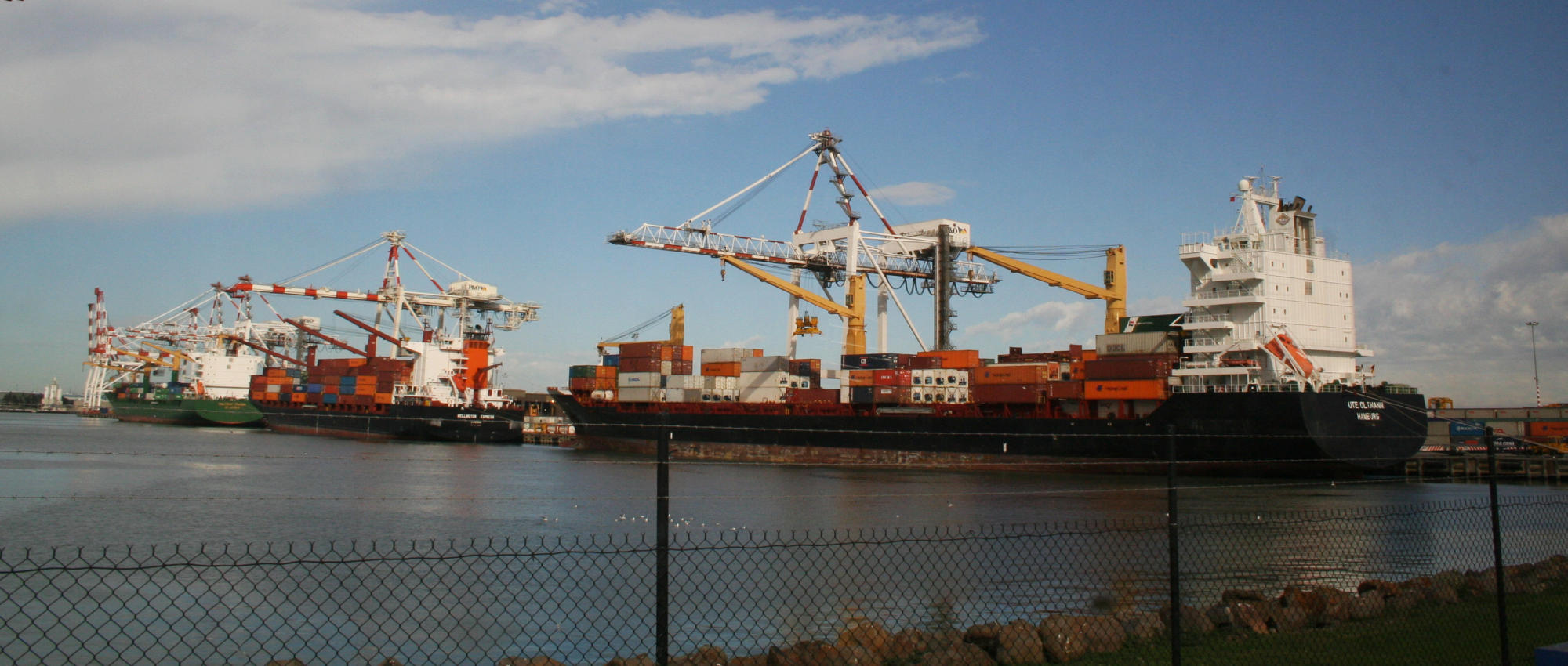
Three container ships berthed at Swanson Dock West at the Port of Melbourne. The port is Australia's prime container port and is managed by the Port of Melbourne Corporation.

The Department of Transport was established in 2008 and assumed the transport portfolio responsibilities of the former Department of Infrastructure. The activities and powers of the Department of Transport were governed by both the portfolios of its ministers, the Minister for Public Transport, the Minister for Roads, the Minister for Ports and by the Transport Integration Act 2010.

The department initially started its operation under the Transport Act 1983, which contained an old and minimalist policy framework for the department and parts of the broader transport portfolio. The development of the Transport Integration Act 2010 after a comprehensive process driven by the Transport Legislation Review provided policy and organisational coherence to the Victorian transport portfolio by clarifying the central coordinating role of the Department of Transport. It also provided the department and its statutory authorities and offices with a clear and modern policy framework and new organisational charters. The charter of the department was made up of its objects and functions set out in the Transport Integration Act 2010 and these commenced in June 2010.

The Secretary of the Department of Transport was Jim Betts who was promoted to the role from the office of Director of Public Transport.

=== Objects ===
The objects of the department were set out in the Transport Integration Act 2010 as:

"(a) ensure that a transport system is provided consistent with the vision statement and the transport system objectives;
(b) determine strategic policies which specify priorities for the transport system that address current and future challenges;
(c) ensure in collaboration with transport bodies and other bodies that policies and plans for an integrated and sustainable transport system are developed, aligned and implemented."

=== Functions ===
The Transport Integration Act 2010 provided that the "...principal function of the Department is to assist the Minister in the administration of this Act and other transport legislation..." Other functions conferred on the Department include -

- being the lead in strategic policy, advice and legislation relating to the transport system and related matters other than road safety
- coordinating the development of regulatory policy and legislation relating to the transport system and related matters
- leading in the improvement of the transport system, including in the procurement, development, construction and commissioning of new transport infrastructure and services
- establishing a medium and long term planning framework for all forms of transport for the delivery of an integrated transport system
- providing independent advice to the Minister in relation to proposals and initiatives of other transport bodies
- developing strategies, plans, standards, performance indicators, programs and projects relating to the transport system
- seeking to ensure, in collaboration with the Public Transport Development Authority, the Roads Corporation and Municipal Councils, that access to road and rail is balanced in a manner consistent with Government policies and strategies for public transport and freight
- coordinating corporate planning and budgets to assist transport bodies with development, alignment, implementation and monitoring of their corporate plans and budgets
- undertaking operational activities including transport system operations, asset management and project management
- collecting transport data and undertake research into the transport system
- providing corporate, financial management, property and other specialist services to transport bodies
- providing assistance to public entities and private bodies to construct or improve transport facilities
- carrying out efficiently and effectively any contract entered into by the Minister on behalf of the Crown
- representing transport interests in liaising with other Victorian, Commonwealth and other jurisdiction's Departments and agencies, including in relation to regulatory reform and funding.

The act also provided the Secretary of the department with a range of specific powers including the power to enter into any agreement or contract.

== Particular responsibilities ==
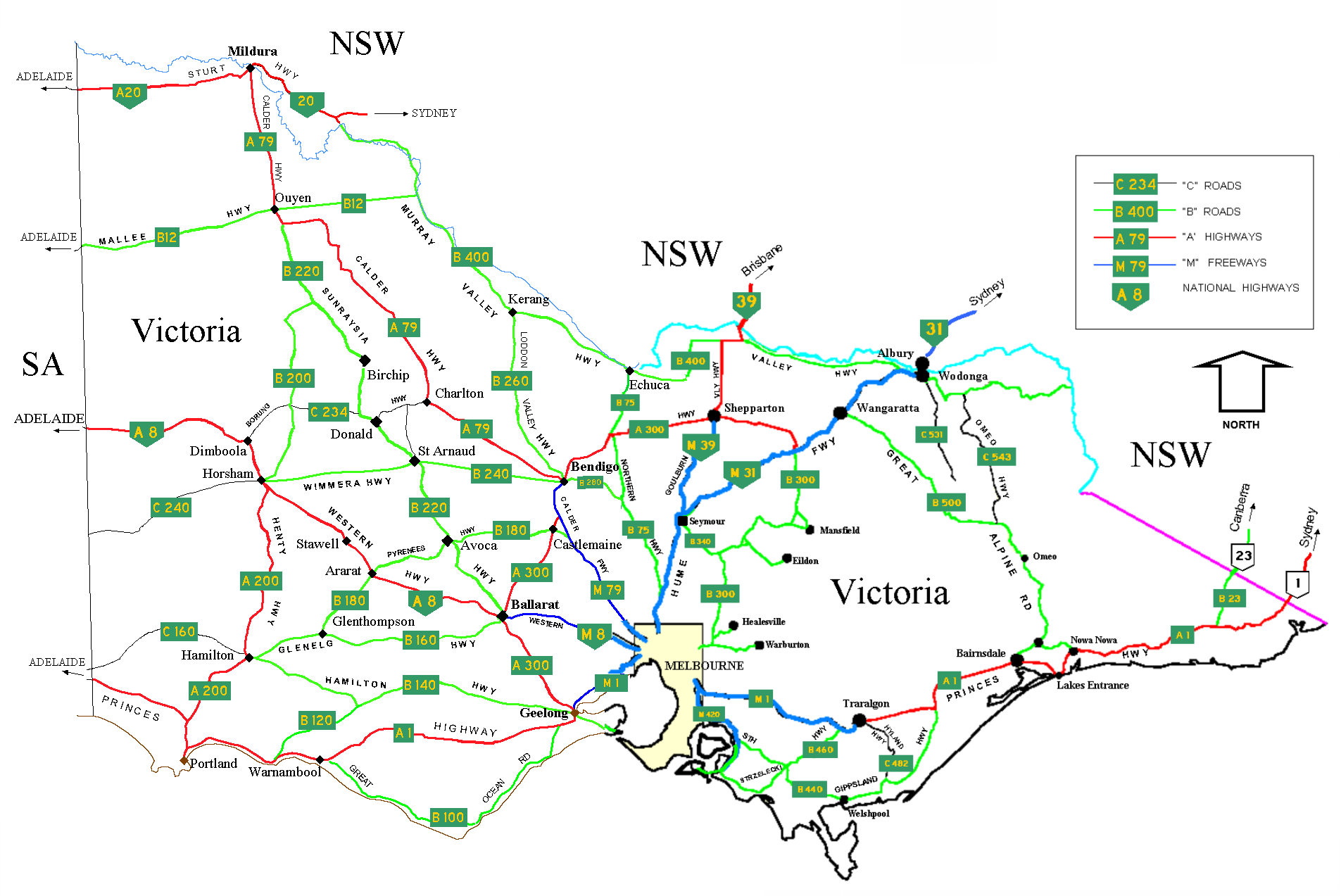
A Map of Victoria's highway network.

The Transport Integration Act 2010 imposed a range of responsibilities on the Department of Transport, including:

- preparation of Victoria's transport plan and revising that plan periodically
- coordination of agencies' corporate plans across the transport portfolios
- taking the lead in policy and legislation review including projects such as the Transport Legislation Review

== Transport portfolio agencies ==
DOT oversaw and coordinated the activities of the state agencies responsible for the transport system in Victoria. These agencies were divided into three main types - statutory offices, statutory authorities and independent transport safety agencies.

Together with DOT, the agencies provided, managed and regulated transport system activities in Victoria including -

- heavy and light rail systems including trains and trams
- roads systems and vehicles including cars, trucks and bicycles
- ports and waterways including commercial ships and recreational vessels
- some air transport systems.

=== Statutory offices ===
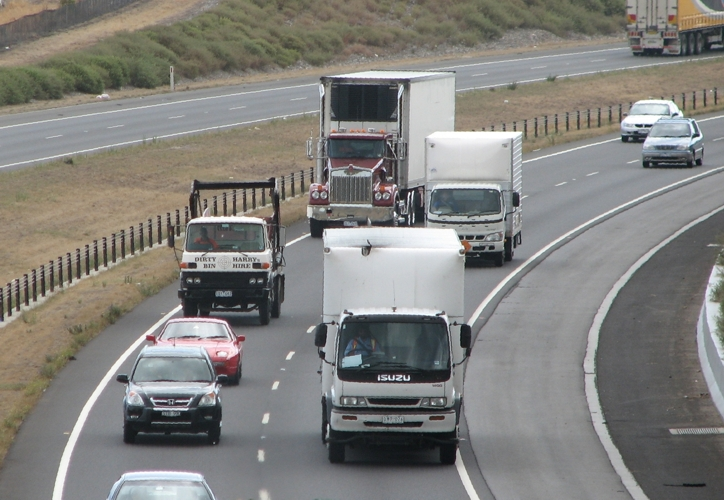
Cars and trucks on the Craigieburn Bypass north of Melbourne. Victoria has an extensive road network managed by VicRoads.

The statutory offices included -

- the Director of Public Transport
- the Transport Infrastructure Development Agent.

These agencies were part of the Department of Transport but each had a distinct statutory charter and powers.

=== Statutory authorities ===
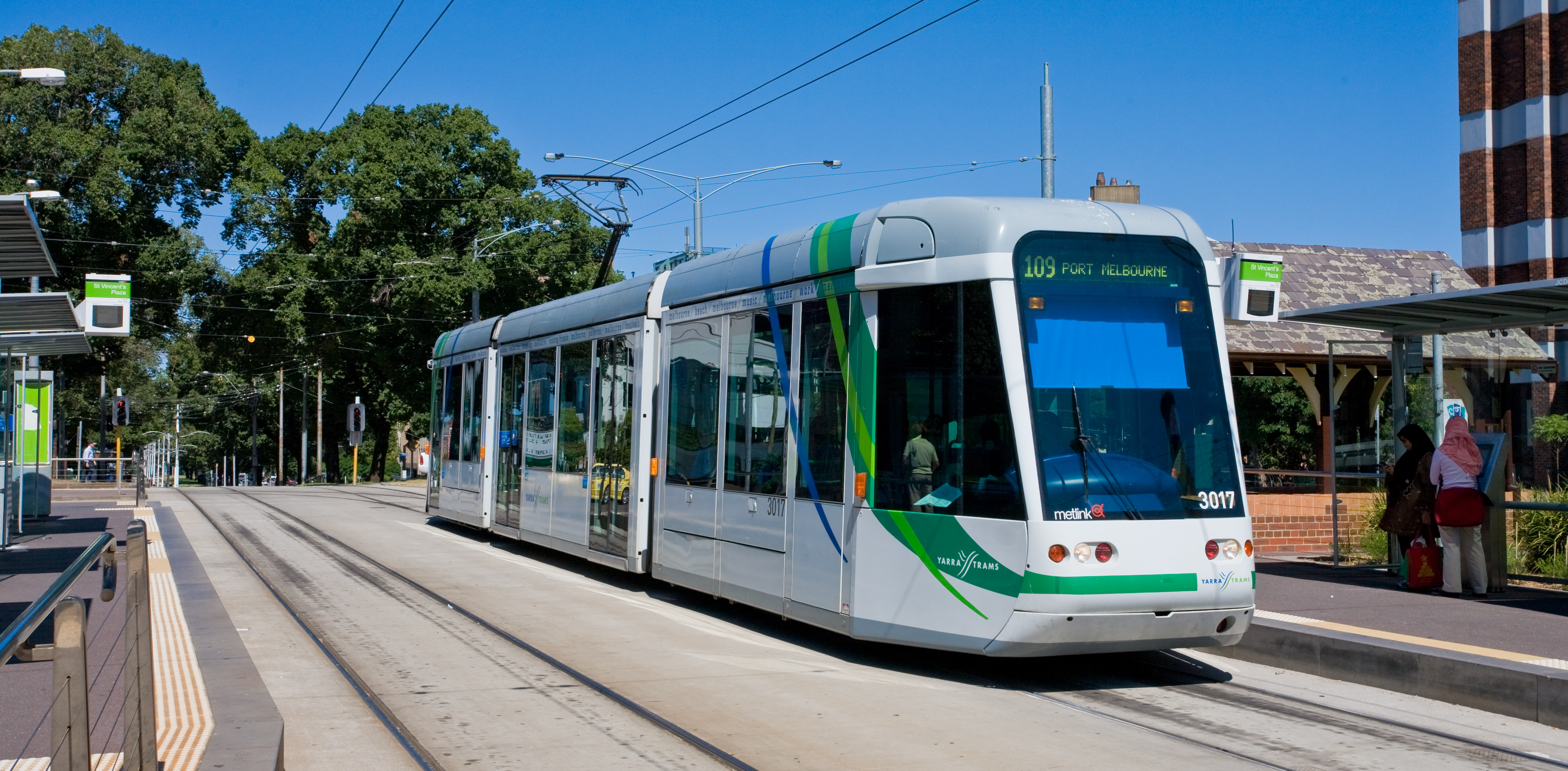
A Melbourne tram (C class tram number 3017) at the St Vincents Plaza stop in East Melbourne. Melbourne has the largest tram network of any city in the world and trams play a key role in the city's public transport system.

The statutory authorities are -

- the Roads Corporation (VicRoads)
- the Public Transport Victoria (PT)
- Victorian Rail Track (VicTrack)
- V/Line Corporation (V/Line)
- the Taxi Services Commission
- the Linking Melbourne Authority
- the Port of Melbourne Corporation
- the Port of Hastings Development Authority
- the Victorian Regional Channels Authority
- the Transport Ticketing Authority
- the Regional Rail Link Authority.

These agencies were structurally separate from the Department of Transport.

Transport for Victoria, a new statutory authority, would eventually be created in 2016, combining planning functions of Public Transport Victoria and VicRoads as well as functions of other agencies.

=== Independent transport safety agencies ===
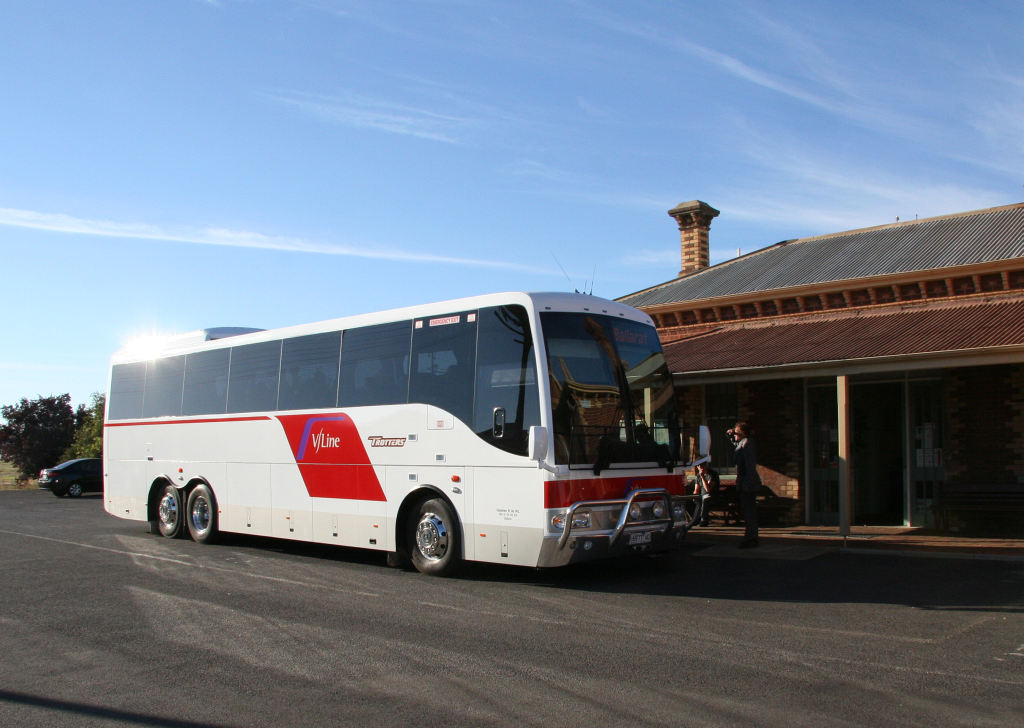
A coach in V/Line livery at Stawell station in regional Victoria. The coach is operated by Trotters under contract. Buses are a key part of Victoria's overall public transport system.

The independent transport safety agencies are -

- the Director, Transport Safety (Transport Safety Victoria)
- the Chief Investigator, Transport Safety.

These agencies were part of the Department of Transport but were functionally independent and reported to the relevant Ministers. The Director, Transport Safety has oversight of safety regulation schemes and industry performance under the schemes, while the Chief Investigator, Transport Safety is responsible for no blame or just culture inquiries and investigations in the transport sector.

== See also ==
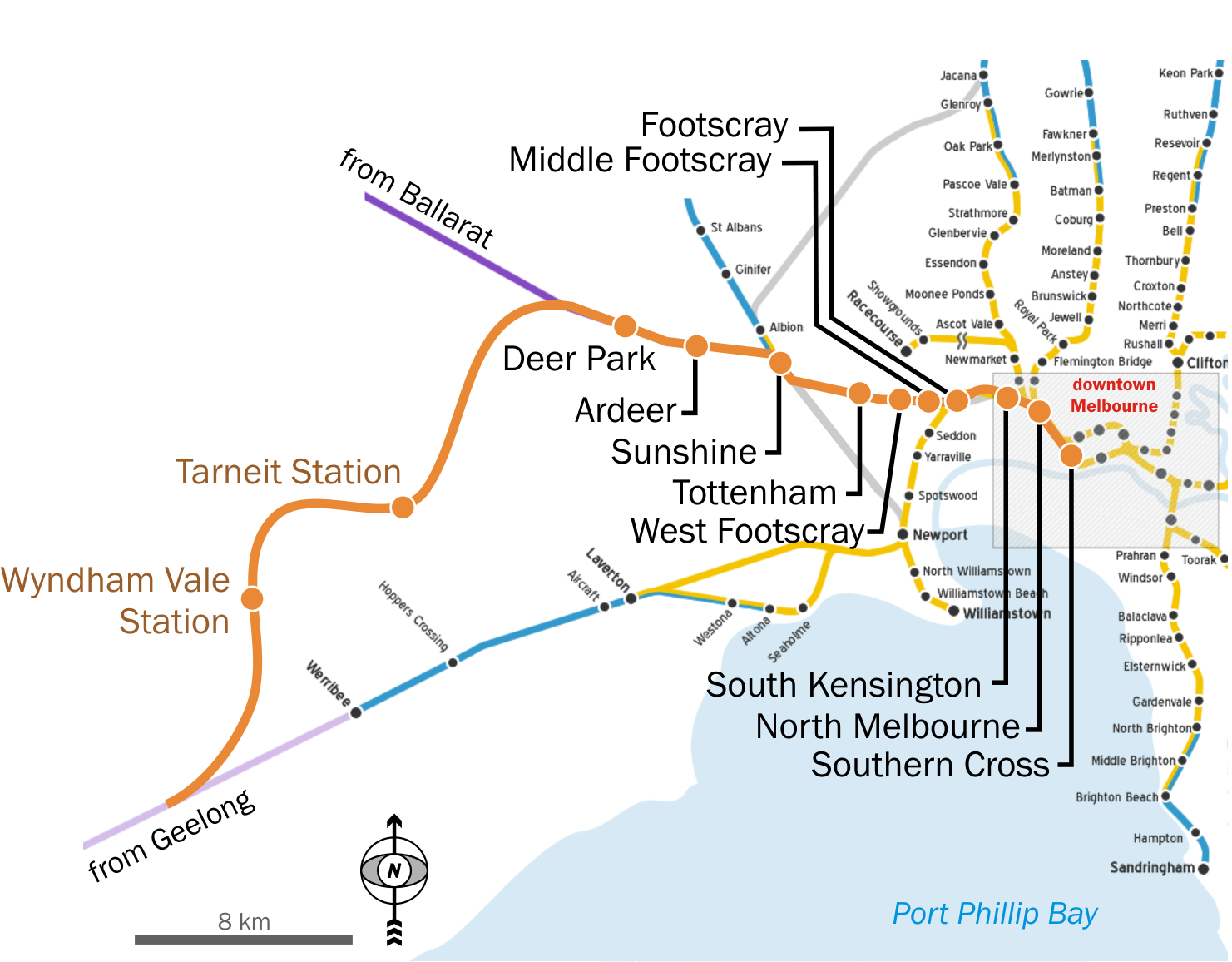
A Map of Melbourne's railway network with the projected Regional Rail Link. The project involves the construction of a rail link through the western suburbs of Melbourne from Southern Cross station, running through Sunshine, Tarneit and meeting the Geelong line at West Werribee. It was completed in June 2015.

- Transport Integration Act 2010
- Rail Safety Act
- Bus Safety Act
- Accident Towing Services Act
- Rail transport in Victoria
- Railways in Melbourne
- Road transport in Victoria
- Trams in Melbourne
- Transport (Compliance and Miscellaneous) Act 1983
- Tourist and Heritage Railways Act
