= Metro Trains Melbourne =

Public transport operator in Melbourne, Australia

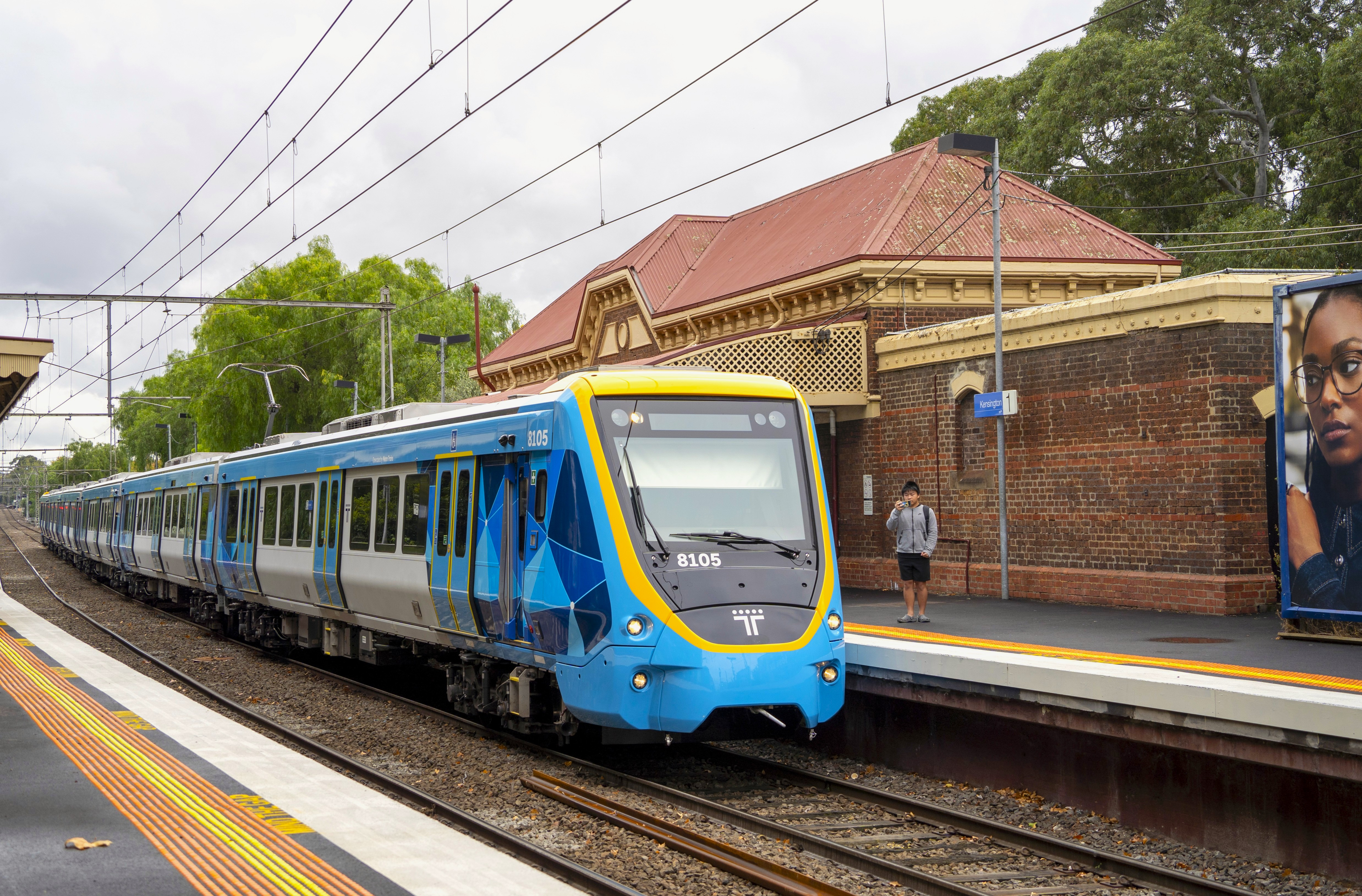
- An X'Trapolis 2.0 train operated by Metro Trains at Kensington station, May 2026

Overview
- Fleet: 269 six-carriage trains
- Stations operated: 227
- Parent company: MTR Corporation (60%); John Holland Group (20%); UGL Rail (20%)
- Dates of operation: 30 November 2009–
- Predecessor: Connex Melbourne

Technical
- Track gauge: 1,600 mm (5 ft 3 in) Victorian broad gauge
- Electrification: 1,500 V DC from overhead catenary (except unelectrified Stony Point)
- Length: 430 km (270 mi)
- Track length: 998 km (620 mi)

Other
- Website: metrotrains.com.au

Metro Trains Melbourne, often known simply as Metro, is the operator and brand name of train services on the electrified metropolitan rail network serving the city of Melbourne, Victoria, Australia. It is the largest urban rail network in Australia, with 17 lines and 227 stations across 405 km (252 mi) of railways, and the second busiest network in Australia, with a patronage of 182.5 million as of 2023–2024.

The network is owned by Transport Victoria who sublet the infrastructure and rolling stock to Metro Trains Melbourne, a joint venture between Hong Kong–based MTR Corporation (60%), John Holland Group (20%) and UGL Rail (20%). The three constituent companies are also partners in the Metro Trains Sydney joint venture, which has operated the Sydney Metro network since 2019. Metro Trains Melbourne took over as operator from Connex in 2009.

Metro Trains Melbourne operates a fleet of 269 six-car train sets on over 1,000 kilometres (621 mi) of track. There are sixteen regular service rail lines and one special events railway line. Metro Trains Melbourne is also responsible for 222 railway stations and employs a workforce of 7,000 including train drivers, mechanical and electrical engineers, network operations specialists and station officers.

The railway track, infrastructure and rolling stock is owned by VicTrack on behalf of the State Government, and is leased to Transport Victoria which then sub-leases them to Metro Trains Melbourne. The State Government now also owns the name 'Metro,' and it will likely stay after a change of operators. Metro Trains has faced criticism in the past and was voted the worst rail system in Australia in 2011. However, the operation, punctuality and consistency of the network has greatly improved since 2014 with level crossing removals, target benchmarks for trains and more frequent trains.

== History ==
Metro Trains Melbourne was selected as the new operator by the Government of Victoria through its relevant agency, the Director of Public Transport, in June 2009 and replaced the previous operator, Connex Melbourne, on 30 November 2009. It was awarded an eight-year contract with the option of being extended for a further seven years. On 2 April 2012, the newly created Public Transport Victoria (now Transport Victoria) took over the management of the contract from the Director of Public Transport.

In May 2012, Australian Rail Tram and Bus Industry Union accused Metro Trains of taking shortcuts in safety procedures, including not checking on-board CCTV and intercoms, and allowing trains with cracked inner glass to take passengers. Metro Trains claim safety equipment is regularly checked during routine maintenance. It was reported in 2013 that tens of thousands of passengers were missing out on compensation when Metro failed to meet monthly performance targets, either because they were not aware of their entitlements or didn't want the hassle of going through a complicated claims system.

On 13 July 2017, Metro experienced a computer outage which resulted in 224 services being cancelled, and 378 services running late. Metro was fined a total of $1.2 million and was forced to reimburse $620,000 to the customers affected. Metro Trains chief Mike Haughton said: "A failure in the core train control system had meant operators could not see the trains, so it was shut down for safety reasons."

In September 2017 the state government extended the contract with Metro Trains until November 2024. It was later extended to May 2026, then until November 2027.

== Rolling stock ==
The majority of rolling stock is owned by the Victorian Government business enterprise VicTrack. Metro Trains Melbourne is responsible for maintaining the train fleet. All trains on the Melbourne suburban network are electric (bar the Stony Point Line), operated by drivers, and fitted with power-operated sliding doors which are closed by the driver, but opened by passengers. While the doors of the newer X'Trapolis, Siemens and HCMT sets are opened by a button, the Comeng sets' doors are manually slid open using a handle but still automatically closed by the driver. The Comeng and X'Trapolis sets also have inter-car doors that separate carriages and reduce cabin noise (notably these two sets are the loudest of the four currently active on the electrified section). All trains are fitted with air conditioning, closed-circuit cameras, and emergency intercom systems. Comeng, Seimens and X'Trapolis trains are fixed into three car units, and may operate alone or in pairs. HCMT trains are fixed into seven car units.

As part of the 2008 Victorian Transport Plan, 38 six-car X'Trapolis EMUs were ordered, with the first of 19 trains built by Alstom in Italy arriving at the Newport Workshops on 24 August 2009. The trains were assembled at United Group's Ballarat North Workshops, under a state government requirement for a minimum of 40% local content. Further orders of X'Trapolis saw the fleet total 212 3-car or 106 6-car sets by the time the final sets entered service in 2020.

In September 2016, Evolution Rail (a consortium of Downer Rail, Changchun Railway Vehicles and Plenary Group) was selected to build 65 new High Capacity Metro Trains for delivery from 2019.

In May 2021, an order of 25 X'Trapolis 2.0 trains was confirmed by the Victorian Government in the lead up to the 2021/22 election. The trains will run first on the Craigieburn, Frankston and Upfield lines and are expected to enter in early to mid 2026. These trains have been ordered to allow the retirement of the 40 year old Comeng Trains. In 2022, scrapping began on the oldest of the Comeng Trains after the withdrawal of a series of Comeng Sets. The Pakenham and Cranbourne line is entirely run by HCMT trains since the end of 2022, which will be followed by the Sunbury line in 2026. With the introduction of X'Trapolis 2.0s expected to occur at that time, all Comeng trains will be retired.

=== Current fleet ===
Type	Image	Type	Top speed (km/h)	Built	Number	Notes
Comeng		EMU	115	1981–1988	190 3-car sets	Refurbished 2000–2003, second refurbishment 2017–2021 Retirement began in 2017 with the whole fleet expected to be retired by 2032.
X'Trapolis 100		EMU	143(130 in service)	2002–2004, 2009–2019	212 3-car sets	Ordered by Connex between 2002–2008 with later orders by Metro between 2009–2020.
Siemens Nexas		EMU	147(115 in service)	2002–2005	72 3-car sets	Ordered by M>Train between 2002–2003.
HCMT		EMU	130	2018–2024	70 7-car sets	Entered service between December 2020 – June 2024.
X'Trapolis 2.0		EMU	130	2024–present	50 6-car sets	7 sets currently built and in testing or in service. Entered service beginning May 2026, final sets expected to enter service in 2030.
Sprinter		DMU	130	1993–1995	2 cars	Leased from V/Line for use on the Stony Point line.

=== Maintenance fleet ===
Type	Image	Type	Top speed (km/h)	Built	Number	Notes
P class		Diesel electric locomotives	100	1984	9	Leased from Southern Shorthaul Railroad for use on maintenance trains.
IEV102		Overhead inspection carriage	115	1958	1	Built as Harris trailer 679T in 1958, converted to H type carriage MTH 102 in 1984, and converted to inspection carriage IEV102 in 2011. Was initially retired in 2024 and stored, then returned as an inspection carriage again in April 2026 to be hauled by a P or T Class Locomotives and modified Alstom Comeng carriages 633M–634M and 585M–586M.
EV120	EV120 at Riversdale Station	Infrastructure evaluation carriage	120	2021	1	Built by Geismar in 2021, to replace IEV100 and IEV102. Usually hauled by P or T Class locomotives or modified Alstom Comeng sets 633M–634M and 585M–586M. Nicknamed 'Evie'.
ECOM (Evaluation Comeng)		Modified Alstom Comeng	115	1985 & 1987	2 2-car trains	Originally built in 1985 (585M–586M) and 1987 (633M–634M) for passenger service. Both withdrawn in May 2025 for conversion into evaluation sets. Former trailer carriages scrapped and motor carriages converted, Used to haul EV120 through the Metro Tunnel as diesel locomotives cannot travel through it. Nicknamed 'Evette'.

=== Former fleet ===
Type	Image	Type	Top speed (km/h)	Built	Number	Notes
Hitachi		EMU	116 (115 in service)	1972–1981	14 3-car sets	Refurbished 2007. Retired and stored 2013, farewell tour 2014. All sets transferred to Newport Workshops by 2015. All sold off to private property, except the 6 preserved carriages, although 2 of these are undergoing asbestos testing.
IEV100		Track evaluation vehicle	80 when recording, 100 when not recording	1985	1	Built as EM100, recoded to IEV100 in 2013. Retired in 2023, Stored at South Dynon, future unknown.
B class		Diesel electric locomotives	133	1952–1953	2	Leased from CFCLA then QUBE, Returned to in 2018
T class		Diesel electric locomotives	100	1955–1968	4	Leased from CFCLA then QUBE, Returned to in 2018

=== Classification and configuration ===
Since shortly after the introduction of suburban electric trains in Melbourne, their carriages have been classified as follows. All fleet types have used these classifications, with different fleet types using different number ranges for the carriages.

- M indicates a motorised carriage, with a driving compartment.
- T indicates a trailer carriage.
- D indicated a trailer carriage with a driving compartment. Only Swing-door, Tait, and Hitachi trains had these.
- G indicated a trailer carriage fitted with both electric and gas lighting, for use on both suburban and country services. Only Tait trains had these.
- BT indicated a second class trailer carriage. Only Swing-door and Harris trains had these. Prior to the abolition of first class suburban travel in 1958, motor carriages were second class and trailer carriages were first class (except for some Swing-door carriages).

An exception to the above classifications was the trial double-deck train, which used T to indicate a trailer carriage with a driving compartment, and M to indicate a motorised carriage without a driving compartment.

Currently, all trains except for the HCMT stock are assembled into a symmetrical M-T-M arrangement. Trains comprise either one or two such units. All peak period services and some off-peak services comprise two units. The Hitachi trains, retired in 2014, operated in fixed two-unit sets.

== Lines and services ==
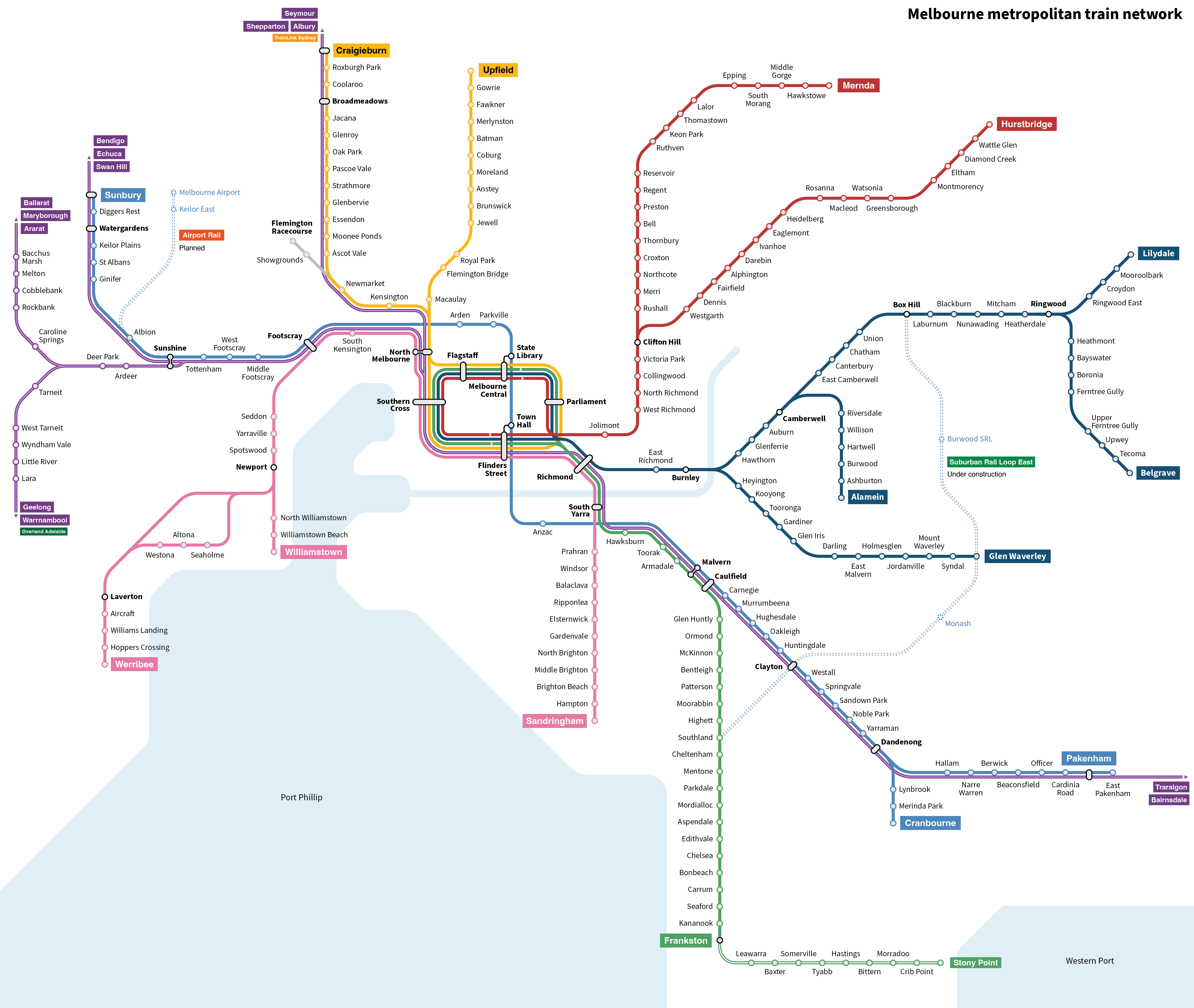
Schematic map of the Melbourne metropolitan train network showing current lines and under-construction projects, including the Metro Tunnel, Melbourne Airport Rail and Suburban Rail Loop East.

Interactive map showing the Melbourne metropolitan rail network, including the under construction Airport rail link in grey.

Melbourne uses "clock-face" timetables in off-peak periods, but generally not in peak periods, due to operating near to the capacity of the infrastructure and having to accommodate single-line sections, flat junctions, and regional diesel-hauled trains. Even in off-peak periods, however, frequencies vary according to time of day and day of week, and by line. In some places, services on two lines combine to provide more frequent services on common sections of tracks. Saturday and Sunday services are identical during the day, but differ during the evening on some lines. Sunday morning services however start later than on Saturdays, and run less frequently until around 10am.

Metro Trains Melbourne operates sixteen passenger rail lines and one special events railway line, under operating groups as follows.

=== Burnley Group ===
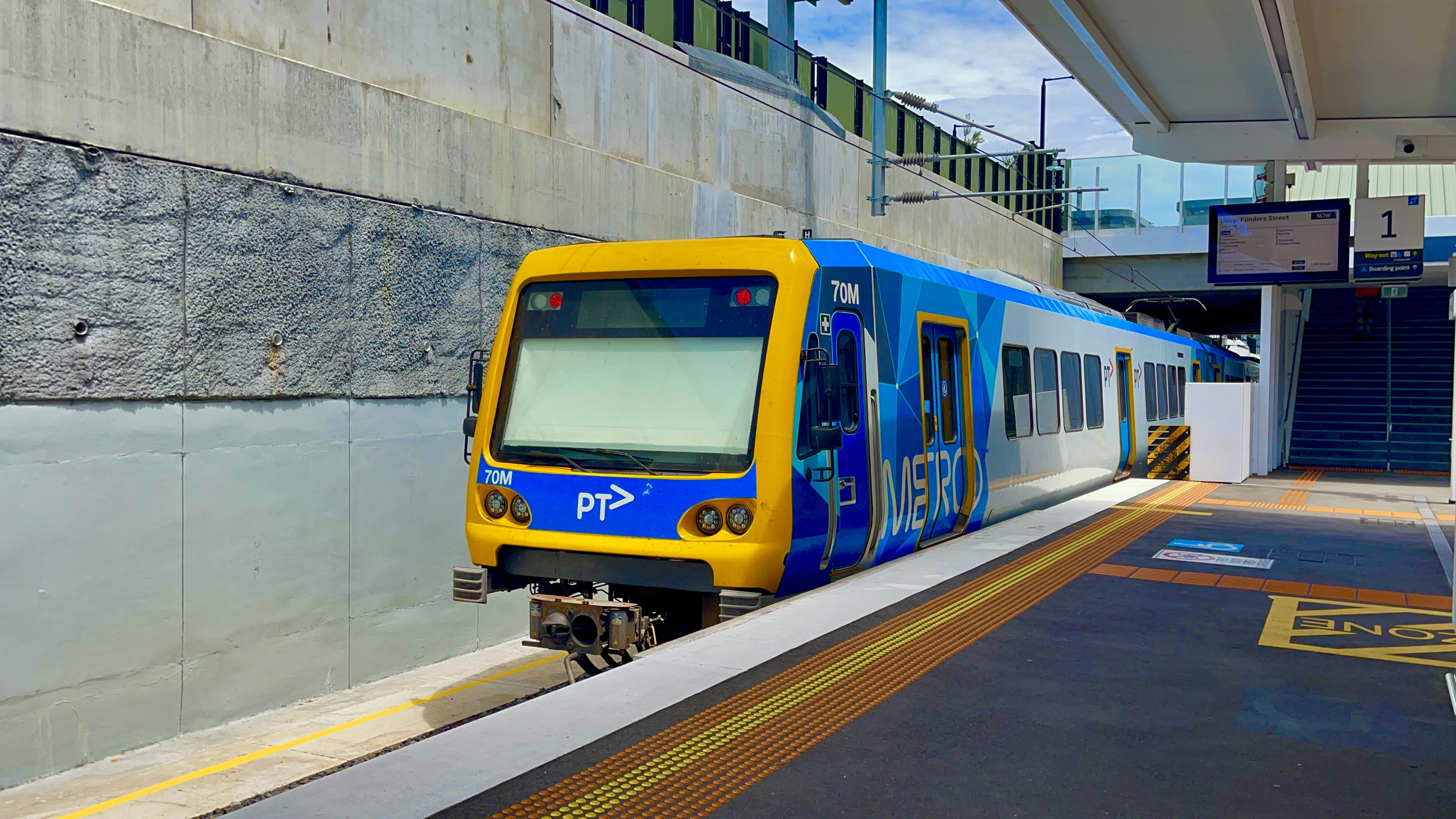
An X'Trapolis 100 at Union Station.

- Lilydale , Belgrave , Alamein & Glen Waverley lines

Lilydale and Belgrave trains operate through the City Loop, running anticlockwise on weekday mornings, and clockwise on weekday afternoons and weekends. Most trains run express during peak hours, with increased frequency in both directions, but more frequent in the direction of peak. Using the triple track from Box Hill to Burnley, express trains can overtake local trains in the direction of the peak.

Glen Waverley trains run direct to and from Flinders Street on weekday mornings. On weekday afternoons and weekends, Glen Waverley trains operate clockwise via the Loop, with Belgrave and Lilydale services.

Alamein trains operate anticlockwise via the Loop during weekday morning and afternoon peaks, and as shuttles to and from Camberwell at all other times.

=== Caulfield Group ===
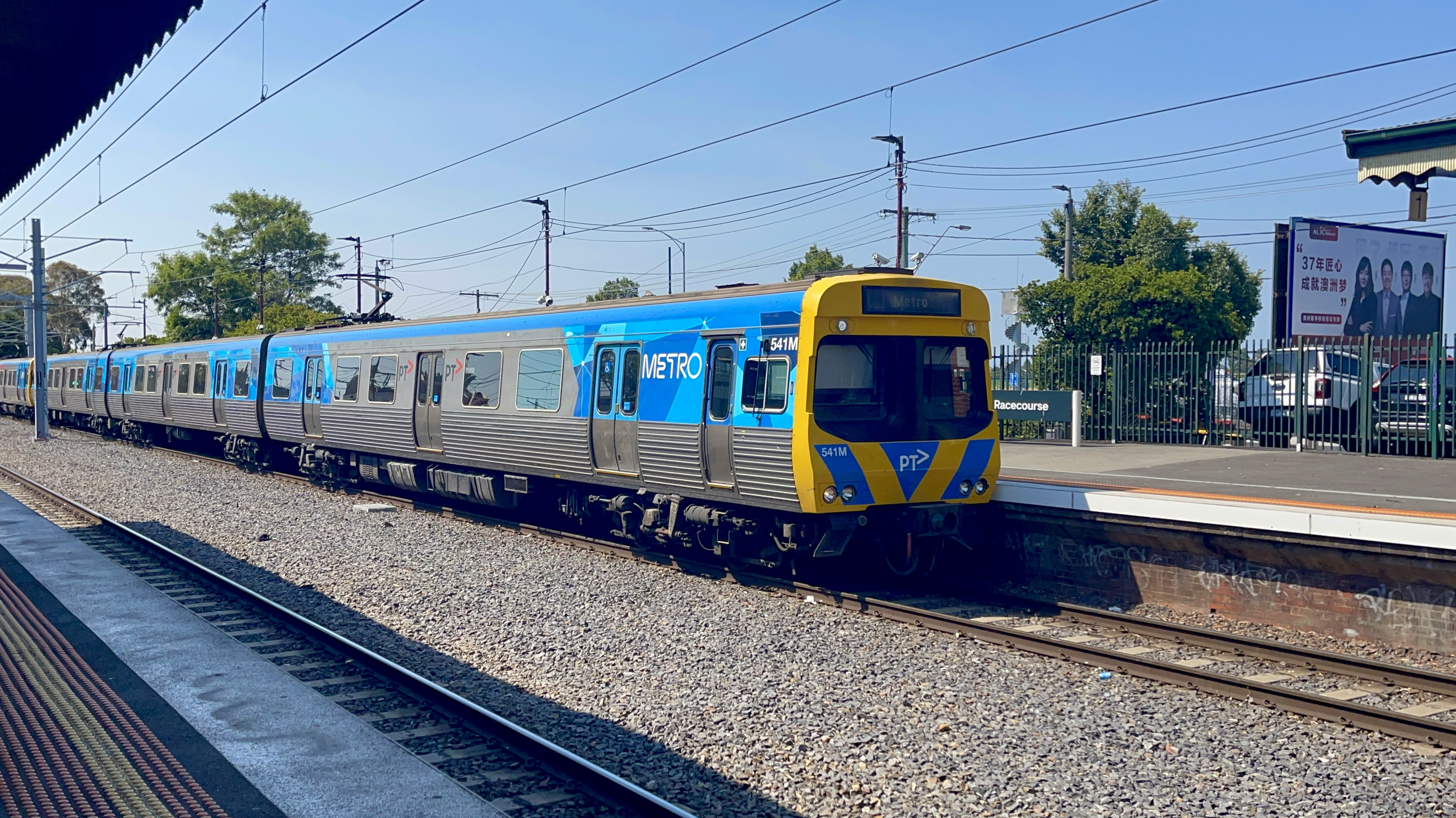
A Comeng Train on an up Frankston Service at Caulfield Station.

- Frankston line

All trains operate through the City Loop in an anti-clockwise direction from Richmond Station.

The Caulfield Group previously consisted of the Cranbourne & Pakenham lines, until the full opening of the Metro Tunnel and their removal from the City Loop on 1 February 2026. Previously, the Frankston line was removed from the Caulfield Group in 2011 when it joined the Cross-City Group, with limited City Loop services continuing until 2021.

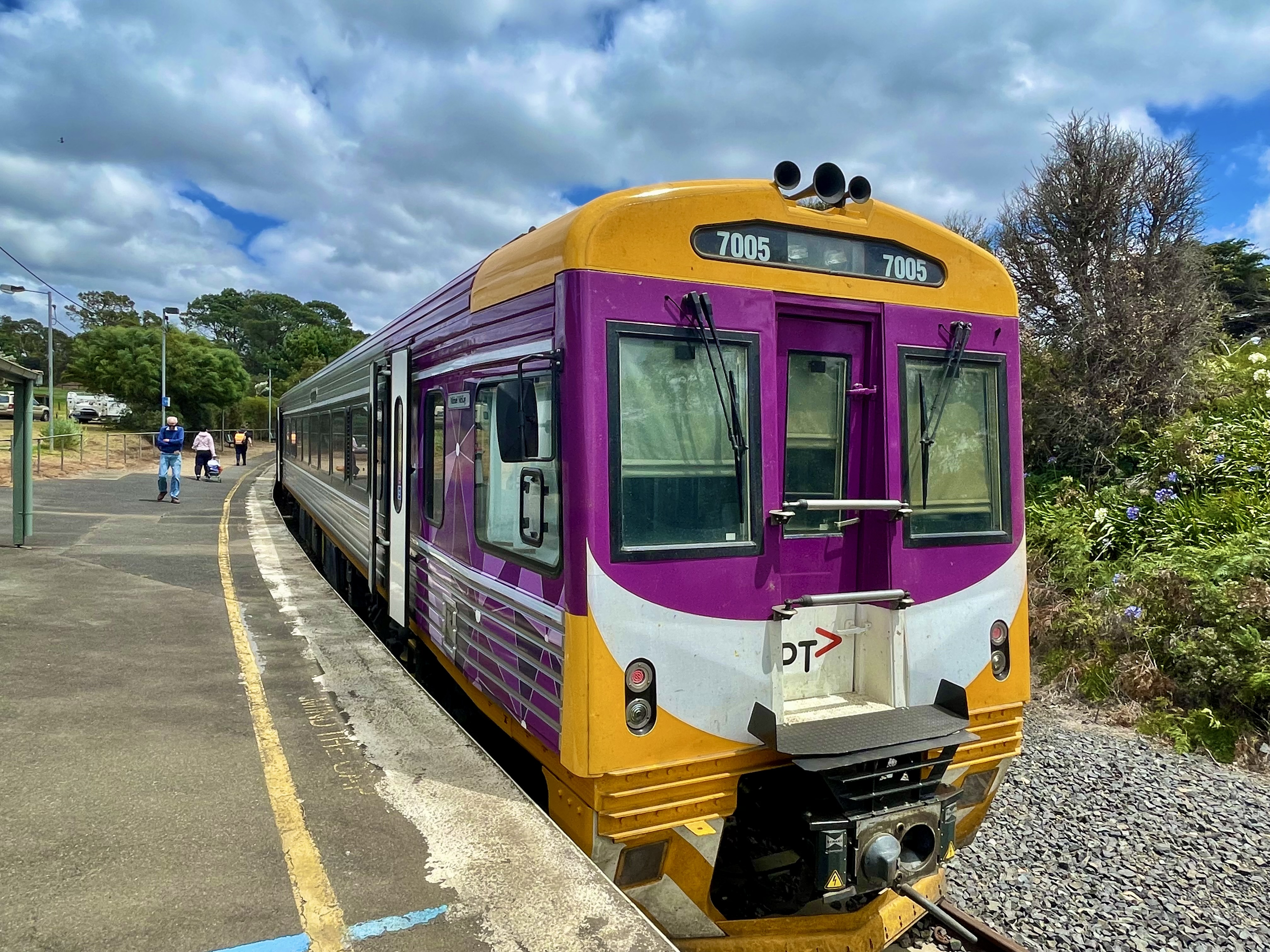
A V/Line Sprinter at Stony Point Station, the terminus of the Stony Point Line.

- Stony Point line

Stony Point line services operate as shuttles from Frankston station with passengers to and from Flinders Street required to change trains as there is no electrification beyond Frankston. It is the only non-electrified line operated by Metro Trains, with services being operated using Sprinter diesel multiple units leased from V/Line.

=== Clifton Hill Group ===
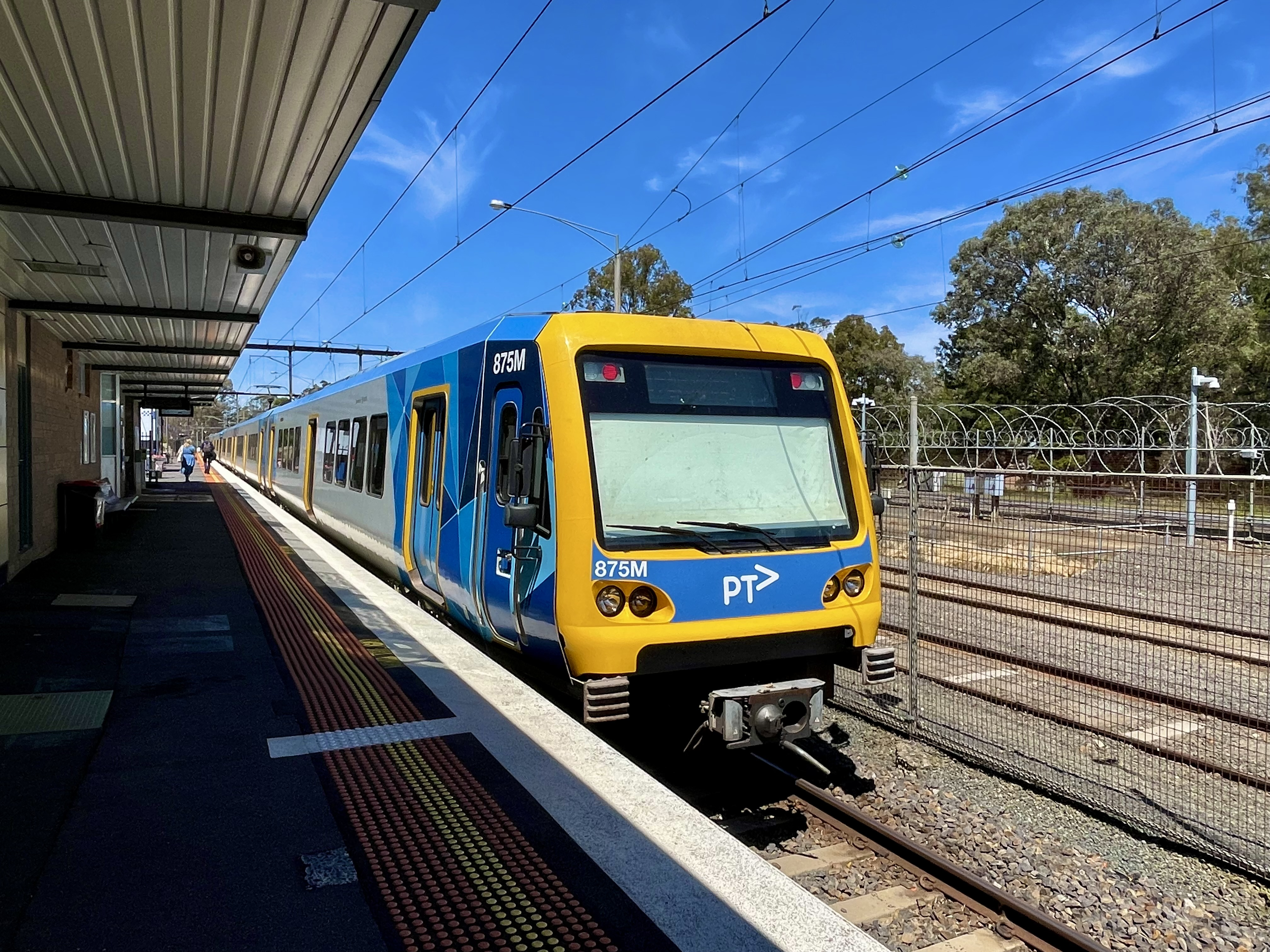
An X'Trapolis 100 at Hurstbridge Station at the terminus on the Hurstbridge Line.

- Mernda & Hurstbridge lines

All trains (with the exception of those departing the city after midnight, all services after midnight run direct from Flinders Street) operate through the City Loop (in a clockwise direction from Jolimont station on weekdays and weekends). On most occasions in peak hour, Hurstbridge line trains operate express between Jolimont and Victoria Park, with the Mernda trains serving the intermediate stations.

=== Cross-City Group ===
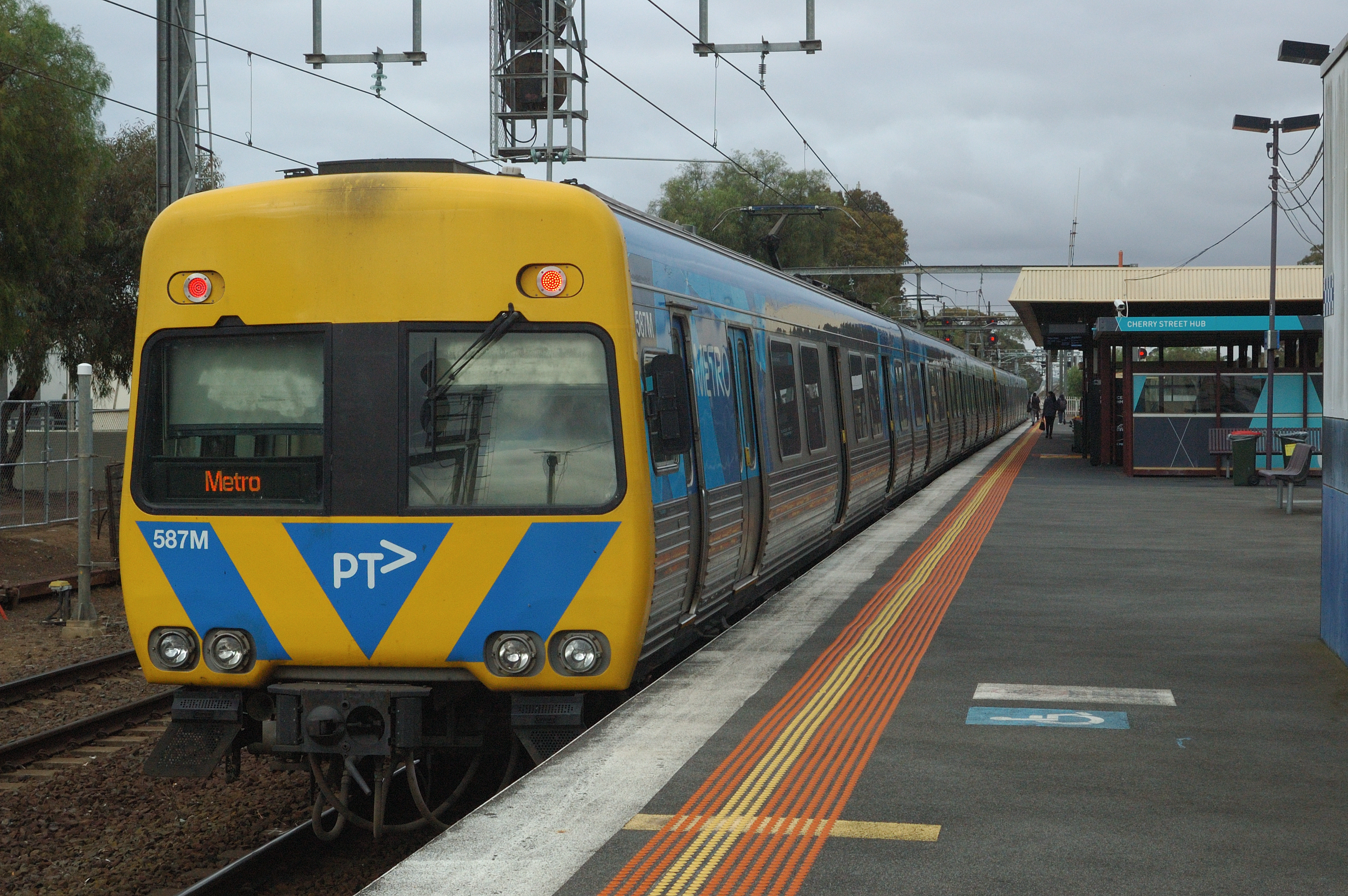
A Comeng Train at Werribee Station, the terminus of the Werribee Line in 2024

- Werribee , Williamstown & Sandringham lines

The Cross-City Group was formed in 2011 by through-running the Frankston line with the Werribee and Williamstown lines, formerly parts of the Caulfield and Northern Groups respectively. Limited services on these lines continued to run through the City Loop until 2021 when all services changed to run direct to and from Flinders Street with most services continuing through to the other side.

Upon the full opening of the Metro Tunnel on 1 February 2026, the Frankston line returned to the Caulfield tunnels in the City Loop with the Sandringham line taking its place in the Cross-City Group. All services ended at Flinders Street, until August 2026, when through-running between Werribee/Williamstown and Sandringham was implemented.

Werribee services stop all stations via Altona on weekends only. On weekdays, they run express between Footscray, Newport and Laverton, and all stations between Laverton and Werribee. Weekday services stopping all stations between Footscray and Laverton via Altona terminate at Laverton.

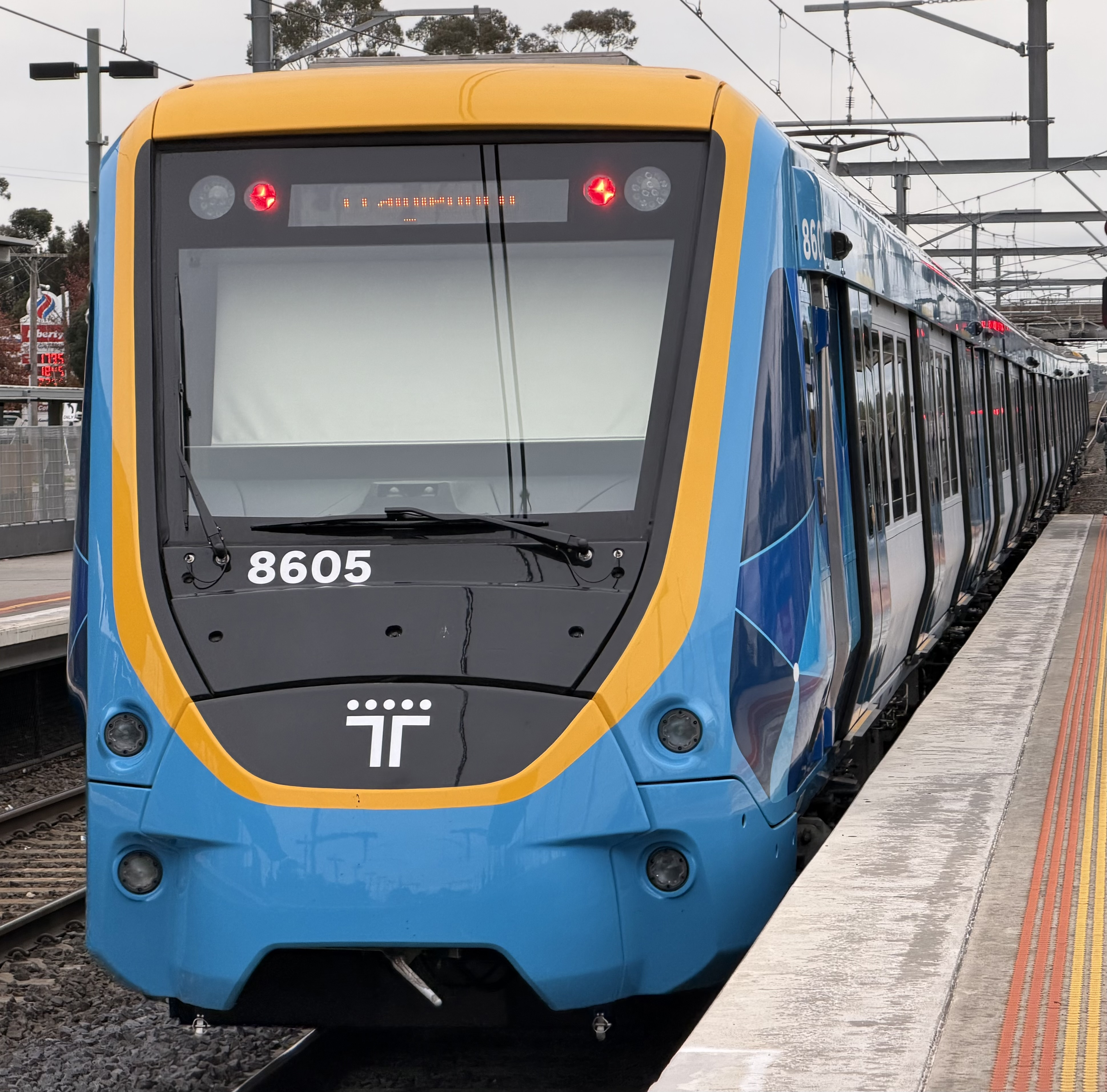
An X'Trapolis 2.0 departing Craigieburn Station After completing the down Craigieburn service in May 2026

=== Northern Group ===
- Craigieburn & Upfield lines

The Northern Group operates through the City Loop at all times except during Night Network (Saturday & Sundays, Midnight to 5am).

When services do operate via the City Loop they run under the following patterns

- Clockwise: Weekday Mornings (Until 12:30pm) and all day on Weekends
- Anti Clockwise: After 12:30pm on Weekdays

The Sunbury line was previously part of the Northern Group, until the full opening of the Metro Tunnel and their removal from the City Loop on 1 February 2026.

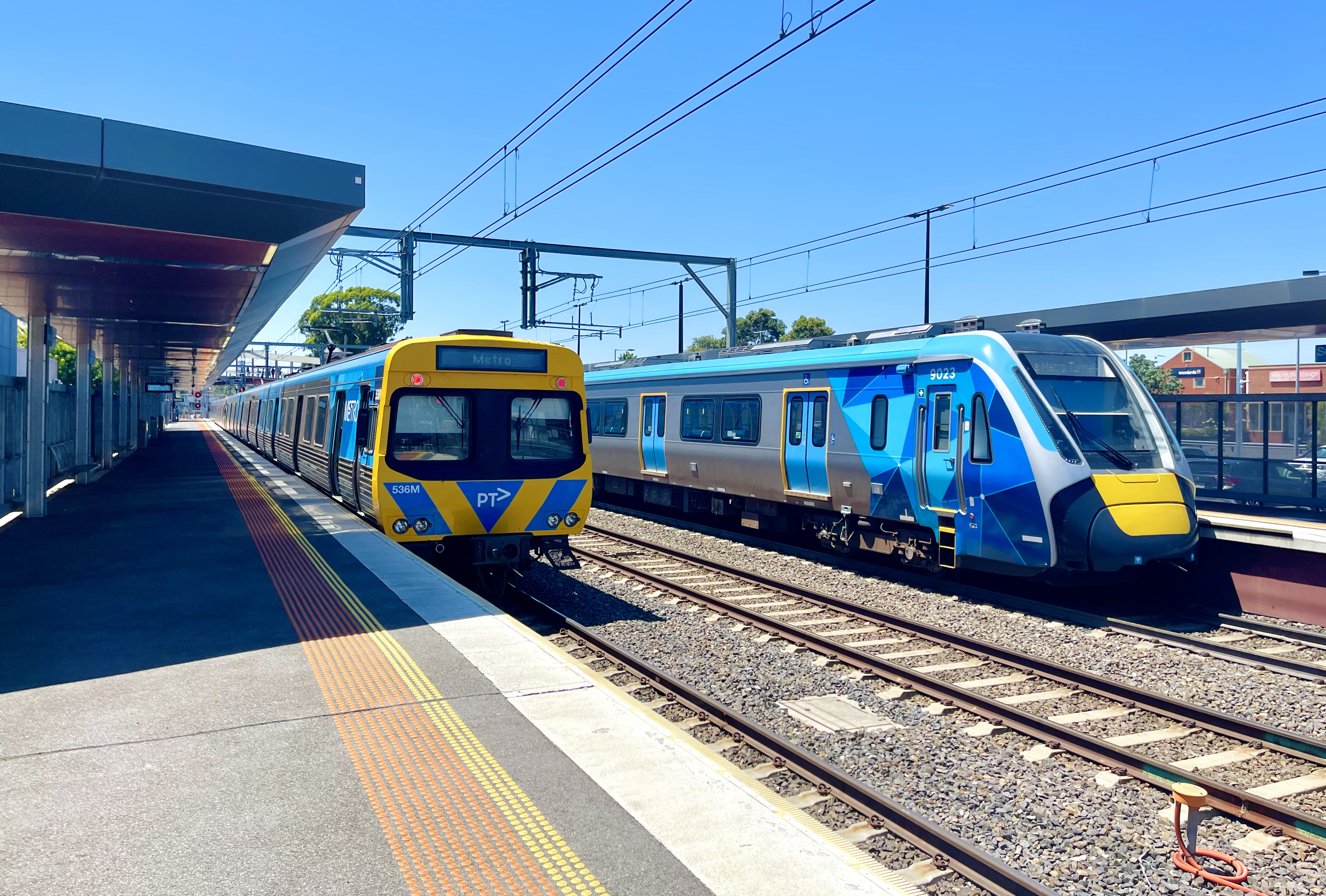
A Comeng and its successor HCMT at Sunbury Station on the Sunbury Line, a few days prior to the network change

=== Yarra Group ===
- Cranbourne , Pakenham & Sunbury lines

Yarra Group trains through-run under the CBD via the Metro Tunnel.

The Metro Tunnel soft-opened on 30 November 2025 running limited services alongside the existing timetable until 1 February 2026, when these services were removed from the City Loop and began running full-time through the Metro Tunnel.

During night network (Saturday 12:30am-5am, Sunday 12:30am-7am), all services skip Arden, Parkville, State Library and Anzac.

=== Special services ===
- Flemington Racecourse line

There are no regularly scheduled services on the Flemington Racecourse line, but services are run to the Racecourse whenever race meetings are held at the racecourse. Services also run to the Showgrounds platform during the Royal Melbourne Show every September, as well as during large events such as university examinations. Services to Flemington Racecourse can also be run on occasions of closures on the Craigieburn line, such as during the Buckley Street Level Crossing Removal in 2018 when replacement buses to Craigieburn departed Flemington Racecourse Station.

== Stations ==
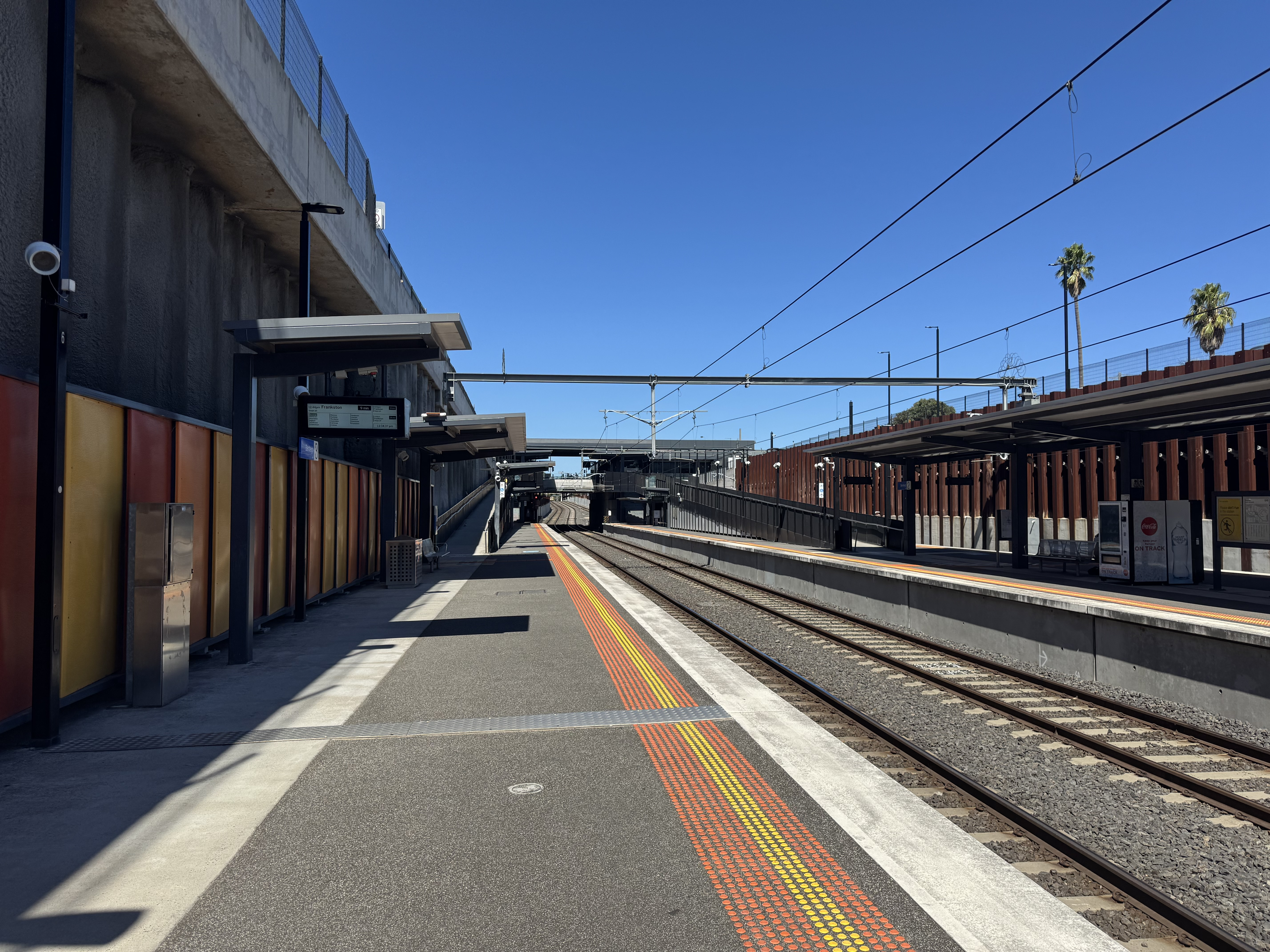
Bentleigh railway station in March 2025

Metro Trains Melbourne are responsible for the day-to-day operations of 227 stations. Metropolitan railway stations include: terminus stations, premium stations staffed from first to last train (and all night during Night Network, except the underground City Loop and Southern Cross stations, which close between 00.30–01:00) who provide extra assistance and information to commuters, and host stations that are staffed primarily between 07:00 to 9:30 for the morning peak, although some stations are staffed for an extended morning peak between 06:30 to 10:00.

== Fares and tickets ==
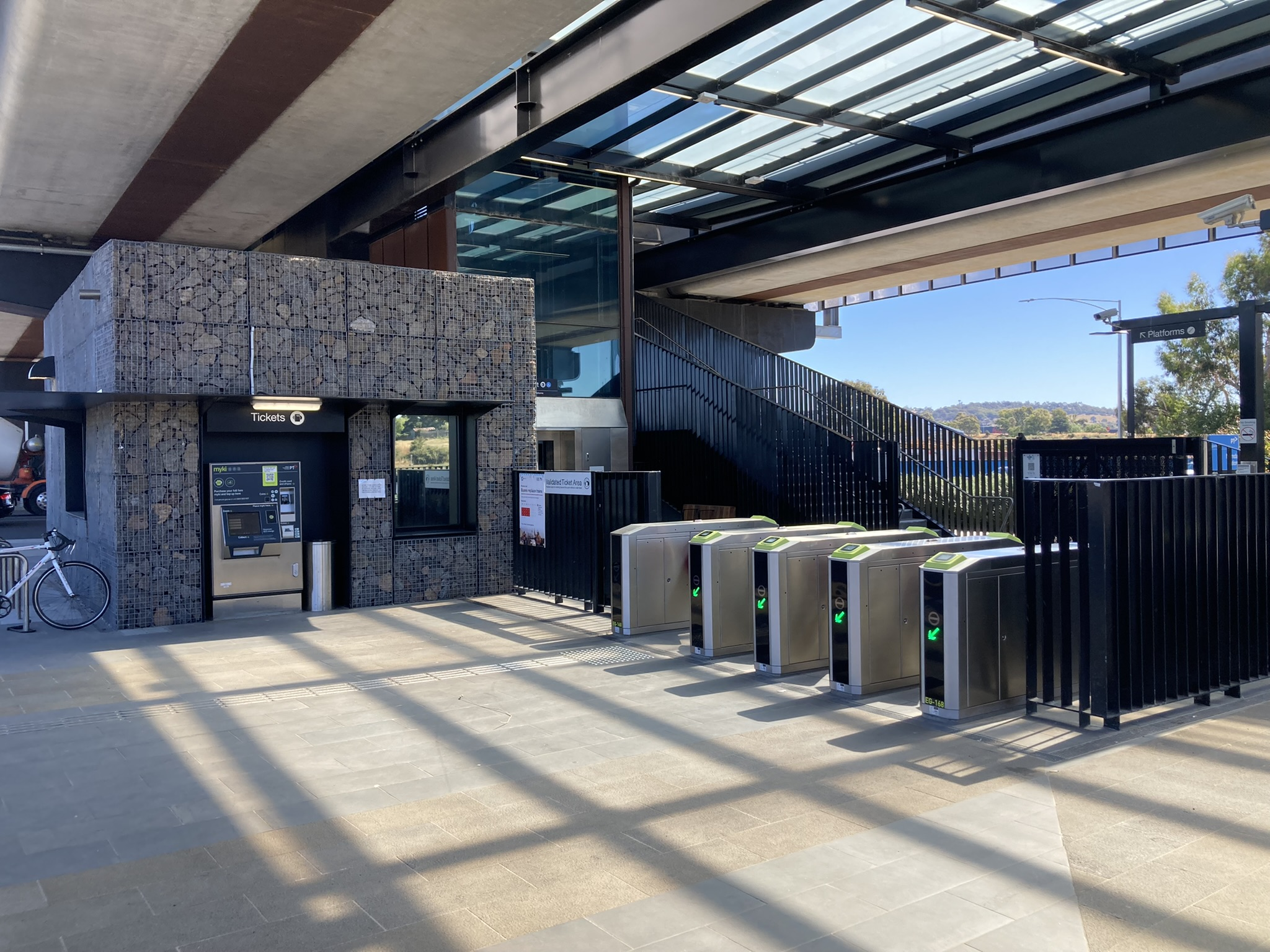
Ticket gates at Mernda railway station

Metro Trains Melbourne uses the myki ticketing system exclusively. Myki is a time and zone based ticketing system, with validity periods ranging from two hours to one year, and two zones covering the Melbourne metropolitan area.

The Metcard ticketing system was decommissioned on 28 December 2012.

=== Fare enforcement ===
Like the other modes of public transport in Victoria, Metro Trains Melbourne employs Authorised Officers (commonly known as "ticket inspectors") who exercise powers under the Transport (Compliance and Miscellaneous) Act 1983. The main responsibilities of Authorised Officers are to report ticketing and behavioural offences to the Victorian Department of Transport, provide customer information and help during special events.

Authorised Officers are authorised by the Director of Public Transport to exercise powers similar to those of police, allowing them to check tickets and verify concession entitlements. In some circumstances, Authorised Officers may also perform arrests when aboard other vehicles operating under PTV or when on Department of Transport-owned premises, such as railway stations or train tracks.

Authorised Officers are required to adhere to the Code of Conduct for Public Transport Authorised Officers. and violations of this code are prosecuted. The Code of Conduct states that an Authorised Officer may use discretion when reporting an alleged offender, and must supply their name and work address when asked. If an Authorised Officer believes that a passenger has committed an offence, they have the right to request the offender's name and address after having explained the nature of the alleged offence to the offender. The Authorised Officer also have the right to request proof of the given information. If the offender refuses to provide identification or provides false information, Authorised Officers will then contact Victoria Police. Authorised Officers also have the right to detain the offender until the police or further assistance arrives.

Authorised Officers are required to submit a Report of non-compliance with the details, specific nature and circumstances of the offence to the Department of Transport, who then processes the reports and decide upon any penalties. Any fines levied are payable to the Department, not to Metro Trains Melbourne. Metro Trains Melbourne receives a small administration fee to cover the costs associated with employing Authorised Officers.

== Punctuality ==
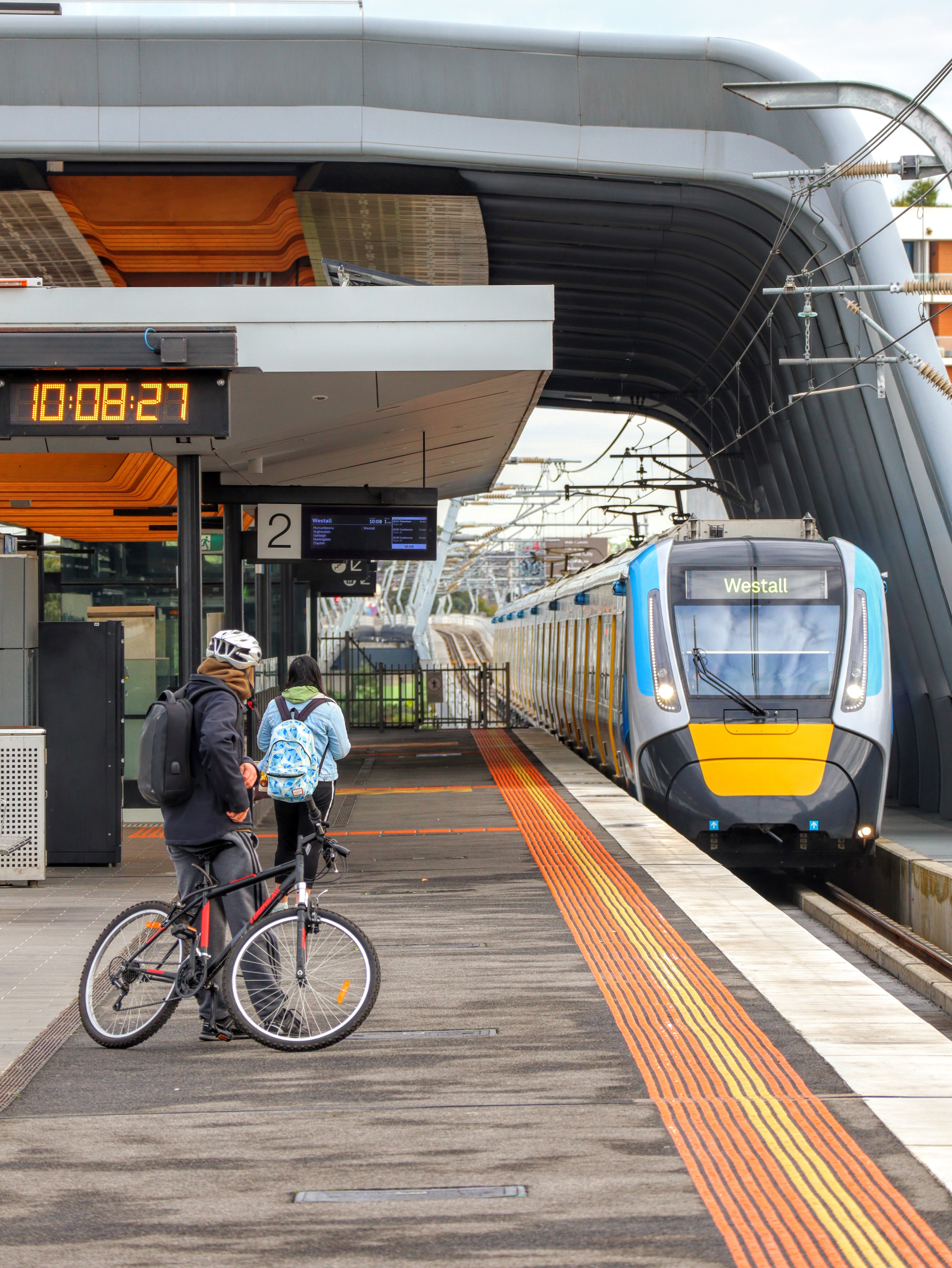
High Capacity Metro Train approaches Carnegie Station, South East of Melbourne

Metro failed to meet Government set targets for punctuality in all of its first 9 months in operation, with almost 1 in 4 trains being late.

Metro's performance improved in 2011, exceeding performance benchmarks for six consecutive months from June to November – the first time this had been achieved since December 2008. Since April 2012, the punctuality figures have been consistently outperforming the benchmark, while the delivery figures have either exceeded or were very close to the benchmark throughout 2012 and 2013.

Metro has been criticised for meeting its punctuality benchmarks by skipping stations, most commonly the City Loop. In April 2012, Metro Trains acknowledged the practice of altering stopping condition of selected late-running trains (for example, stopping all station to express) in an attempt to make up lost time and meet the Operational Performance Regime set by the state government. A ministerial document showed that the state government raised concerns that some station skipping may not have been warranted. Reportedly, at least 129 drivers' incident reports from mid-April to May record services had been altered in the form of changing a stopping-all-stations to express or terminating a service early. In June 2012, Metro was fined $2.7 million for January to March 2012 quarter for service performance, including skipping stations, running shorter services and bypassing City Loop stations.

The seven-year 2017 contract renewal for Metro Trains contained tougher requirements for punctuality, larger fines for missing targets, and penalties for station skipping, short running and skipping the City Loop. The operator was required to ensure 92% of trains ran on time rather than 88% under the previous contact, however the new contract still defined lateness as five minutes or more behind the timetable. In the first month of the contract Metro Trains failed to hit the target, and a 2021 report found that the operator had not reduced cancellations significantly in the first three years.

Metro met its 92% punctuality requirement for two years, until July 2022 when the operator was forced to give a day of free travel to some users after missing the target by 0.4% that month. Large scale infrastructure projects such as Level Crossing Removal, and signalling upgrades have worked to improve the reliablility and punctuality of the network.

== Legislation and governance ==
=== Transport Integration Act 2010 ===
The prime transport-related statute in Victoria is the Transport Integration Act 2010. The act established the Department of Transport as the integration agency for Victoria's transport system. The act also establishes and sets the charters of the State agencies charged with providing public transport rail services and managing network access for freight services, namely the Director of Public Transport and V/Line. The Act authorises the Director of Public Transport to enter into contracts for the provision of transport services and this provision is the source of the power for the contract between Metro and the Director. In addition, the Transport Integration Act 2010 establishes VicTrack which owns the public rail network and associated infrastructure. VicTrack leases public transport land and infrastructure to the Director of Public Transport who leases it to transport operators such as Metro as well as entering into franchise agreements with the operators for them to run public transport services on behalf of the State.

=== Rail Safety Act 2006 ===
The safety of rail transport operations in Melbourne is regulated by the Rail Safety Act 2006 which applies to all commercial passenger operations. The Act establishes a framework containing safety duties for all rail industry participants and requires operators who manage infrastructure and rolling stock to obtain accreditation prior to commencing operations. Accredited operators are also required to have a safety management system to guide their operations. Sanctions applying to the safety scheme established under the Rail Safety Act are contained in the Transport (Compliance and Miscellaneous) Act 1983. The safety regulator for the rail system in Melbourne including trams is the Director, Transport Safety (trading as Transport Safety Victoria) whose office is established under the Transport Integration Act 2010. No blame investigations for rail matters are undertaken by the Chief Investigator, Transport Safety.

=== Ticketing and conduct ===
Ticketing requirements for trains, trams and buses in Melbourne are mainly contained in the Transport (Ticketing) Regulations 2006 and the Victorian Fares and Ticketing Manual. Rules about safe and fair conduct on trains, trams and buses in Melbourne are generally contained in the Transport (Compliance and Miscellaneous) Act 1983 and the Transport (Conduct) Regulations 2005.

== Publicity ==
=== Dumb Ways to Die ===
In November 2012, Metro launched the safety campaign Dumb Ways to Die which became a global viral video hit through sharing and social media. It also produced merchandise such as posters, stickers and badges. The campaign was leaked to the public several days early by the Fake Metro Trains parody Twitter account.

In May 2013, Metro released a "Dumb Ways to Die" game as an app for iPhone, iPod touch iPad devices, and Android devices. The game invites players to avoid the dangerous activities engaged in by the various characters featured throughout the campaign. Within the app, players can also pledge to "not do dumb stuff around trains". In November 2014, Metro released a sequel, "Dumb Ways to Die 2: the Games" which follows a similar premise as the first game in a style of various sporting events and also allows players to pledge. In 2021, the franchise was acquired by PlaySide Studios.

Preceded by Connex Melbourne	Railways in Melbourne; 2009–	Succeeded by Incumbent
