= Department of Transport, Planning and Local Infrastructure =

Department overview
- Formed: 9 April 2013
- Preceding agencies: Department of Transport; Department of Planning and Community Development; Department of Sustainability and Environment
- Dissolved: 1 January 2015
- Superseding agencies: Department of Economic Development, Jobs, Transport and Resources; Department of Environment, Land, Water and Planning; Department of Health and Human Services
- Type: Department
- Employees: 1119 (June 2014)
- Annual budget: $6.0 billion (FY 2013-14)
- Ministers responsible: Terry Mulder, Minister for Roads, Minister for Public Transport; Matthew Guy, Minister for Planning; David Hodgett, Minister for Ports; Damian Drum, Minister for Sport and Recreation; Tim Bull, Minister for Local Government
- Deputy Ministers responsible: Gary Blackwood, Parliamentary Secretary for Transport; David Morris, Parliamentary Secretary for Local Government
- Department executive: Dean Yates, Secretary
- Website: dtpli.vic.gov.au
- Agency ID: PROV VA 5003

The Department of Transport, Planning and Local Infrastructure (DTPLI) was a department of the Government of Victoria. It was created in machinery of government changes in 2013 following Denis Napthine's appointment as premier, and was abolished in 2015 following the election of a new government led by Daniel Andrews. The department had responsibility for policies relating to transport, planning, local government and sport, and oversaw a variety of other agencies in those functions.

== History ==
Following the resignation of Ted Ballieu as Premier on 6 May 2013, Denis Napthine was elected leader of the parliamentary Liberal Party and sworn in as Premier in the following days. On 9 April, Napthine announced extensive machinery of government changes, reducing the number of departments from 11 to 9. The Department of Transport and Department of Planning and Community Development were merged, creating DTPLI, which also assumed responsibility for land use from the Department of Sustainability and Environment, and minor functions from other departments. Dean Yates, a deputy secretary of the Department of Premier and Cabinet, was appointed secretary, and former Transport secretary Jim Betts' contract was not renewed.

Following the election of the Labor Party under Daniel Andrews at the November 2014 election, DTPLI was abolished on 1 January 2015 in changes which further reduced the number of departments from 9 to 7. The functions of DTPLI were absorbed by the newly created Department of Economic Development, Jobs, Transport and Resources, Department of Environment, Land, Water and Planning, and Department of Health and Human Services.
