= Transport for Victoria =

Office overview
- Formed: April 2017
- Dissolved: April 2019
- Superseding office: Department of Transport and Planning
- Type: Statutory office
- Jurisdiction: Victoria
- Headquarters: Melbourne
- Minister responsible: Gabrielle Williams, Minister for Public and Active Transport
- Office executive: Paul Younis, Secretary of the Department for Transport
- Parent department: Department of Transport and Planning
- Child agencies: Public Transport Victoria; VicRoads; V/Line; Taxi Services Commission; Victorian Ports Corporation; Victorian Regional Channels Authority; Port of Hastings Development Authority; Melbourne Port Lessor
- Key document: Transport Integration Act 2010

Transport for Victoria was a statutory office of the Department of Transport and Planning that was responsible for the planning and coordination of all transport systems in Victoria, Australia.

It acted as an umbrella agency for Public Transport Victoria (PTV, the statutory authority that manages all public transit in Victoria, including trains, trams and buses) and VicRoads (the statutory authority that manages Victoria's roads). In April 2019 the state government combined the responsibilities of VicRoads and PTV into the Department of Transport and Planning resulting in the umbrella agency being redundant.

== History ==
The formation of Transport for Victoria was jointly announced on 27 June 2016, by Jacinta Allan, Minister for Public Transport, and Luke Donnellan, Minister for Roads.

At the time, the government anticipated that TFV would eventually become a single point of information for travel within Victoria, as well as a coordinating agency for the planning of transport infrastructure.

Adam Carey, writing in The Age, suggested that the new authority would only undermine the role of the then recently established PTV as an umbrella agency.

The organization became operational in April 2017 to realise the principal objectives of the Transport Integration Act 2010.

At the start of 2019, TFV became part of the newly established Department of Transport when VicRoads and PTV responsibilities were combined under the new department. This made the need for this agency obsolete.

== Head, Transport for Victoria ==
The office for the head of Transport for Victoria, officially Head, Transport for Victoria, is a statutory office established under section 64A of the Transport Integration Act 2010. The head plays a key strategic role in ensuring Victoria's growing transport system is integrated and coordinated. After the establishment of Department of Transport, the secretary of Department of Transport, currently Paul Younis, also holds the position of acting head of TfV.
