= VicRoads =

Driver and vehicle authority in Australia

Corporation overview
- Formed: 1 July 1989
- Preceding agencies: Road Construction Authority; Road Traffic Authority
- Dissolved: 1 July 2019 (as independent corporation)
- Type: Joint venture
- Employees: 3,006 (June 2018)
- Minister responsible: Paul Hamer, Minister for Roads and Road Safety
- Parent department: Department of Transport and Planning
- Key document: Transport Integration Act 2010
- Website: vicroads.vic.gov.au
- Agency ID: PROV VA 2982

VicRoads is a brand for driver licensing and vehicle registration services operated on behalf of the Department of Transport and Planning (DTP) in the state of Victoria, Australia. The operators of the VicRoads brand – R&L Services Victoria, responsible for registration and licensing, and CP Services Victoria, which sells custom plates – are joint ventures between the Victorian government and a consortium made up of Aware Super, Australian Retirement Trust and Macquarie Asset Management.

VicRoads was previously the trading name of the Roads Corporation, which was formed in 1989 as a merger of the Road Construction Authority and the Road Traffic Authority. In addition to registration and licensing services, the Roads Corporation was also responsible for planning, maintenance and construction of the arterial road network; traffic policy and regulation; and road safety policy and research.

Between 2019 and 2022, the Roads Corporation was disestablished as a legal entity, and its functions were transferred to the Department of Transport (later DTP) and the statutory office of the Head, Transport for Victoria. Registration and licensing services were then outsourced to a joint venture in 2022 under the VicRoads brand.

== Governance ==
In 1983, under the Transport Act 1983, the Country Roads Board was replaced by the Road Construction Authority. In 1989, the Road Traffic Authority was merged with the Road Construction Authority to form the Roads Corporation, trading under the name VicRoads.

VicRoads was re-established on 1 July 2010 under the Transport Integration Act 2010, which established a framework for an integrated and sustainable transport system in Victoria, and empowered the key Victorian Government agencies with responsibility for the State's land and water transport system. The act provided that VicRoads' primary object was to provide, operate and maintain the major road system, consistent with the vision statement in the act and objectives which emphasise transport integration and sustainability. The statute also required VicRoads to "...manage the road system in a manner which supports a sustainable Victoria by seeking to increase the share of public transport, walking and cycling trips as a proportion of all transport trips in Victoria..."

In July 2016, the government announced the creation of Transport for Victoria, a new statutory authority combining the planning functions of Public Transport Victoria and VicRoads, as well as functions of other agencies.

On 1 July 2018, the Major Road Projects Authority was formed, with the function of administering specified road projects transferred from VicRoads to the new authority. On 1 January 2019, the Department of Transport and its major project authority, the Major Transport Infrastructure Authority (MTIA) were formed. The Major Road Projects Authority was renamed Major Road Projects Victoria (MRPV) and became part of MTIA.

In April 2019, it was announced that, from 30 June 2019, VicRoads would cease to exist as an independent entity, with its functions merged with those of Public Transport Victoria into a new division of the Department of Transport. Announcing the reforms, Premier Daniel Andrews argued that the reform would go "one step beyond" the formation of Transport for Victoria, and said that merging the two agencies would lead to planning of an integrated and mode-agnostic transport network. Although the Rail, Tram and Bus Union supported the government's decision, the Australian Services Union, representing a large number of VicRoads administrative staff, opposed the merger. On 1 July 2019, most of VicRoads functions were absorbed into the Department of Transport, excluding registration and licensing functions and some heavy vehicle functions, which remained with a much-reduced VicRoads.

== Operations ==
From 1 July 2019, VicRoads' remaining functions were registration and licensing, and heavy vehicle compliance, enforcement and investigation functions.

On 1 January 2020, all road management functions and responsibilities of VicRoads were transferred to and vested in the Head, Transport for Victoria, an office established under section 64A of the Transport Integration Act 2010 and currently held by the Secretary of Department of Transport. This meant that any reference to VicRoads in road management standards and other technical information must be construed as a reference to Head, Transport for Victoria.

In March 2021, the Victorian Government made an in-principle decision to progress a joint venture model for VicRoads registration, licensing and custom plates. On 30 June 2022 the Roads Corporation ceased to exist through a legislative abolition. On 1 July 2022 partial privatisation formally went into effect for VicRoads through a joint venture model with Aware Super, Australian Retirement Trust and Macquarie Asset Management.

== See also ==
- Transport Integration Act
- Accident Towing Services Act
- Australian Road Rules
- Public Transport Victoria
- Bus Safety Act
- Transport (Compliance and Miscellaneous) Act 1983
