= Public Record Office Victoria =

Archive of the State and local governments in Victoria, Australia

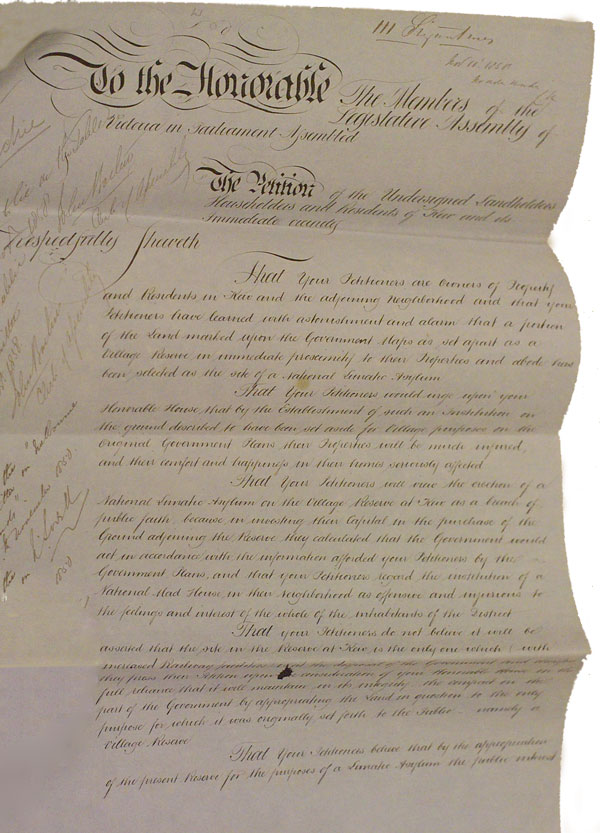
Petition to the Government of Victoria regarding the proposed Kew Lunatic Asylum

Public Record Office Victoria (PROV) is the government archives of the Australian State of Victoria. PROV was created by the Public Records Act 1973 (No. 8418 (Vic)) with responsibility for the better preservation management and utilisation of the public records of the State. It is an agency of the Department of Government Services.

== History ==
Prior to 1903 there was no formal attempt to deposit Victorian government records with an archival authority. In that year ten volumes of Convict Indents were transferred to the Public Library (later the State Library of Victoria) by the Secretary of the Law Department. In 1928 following a board of Inquiry into 'Methods in the Public Service,' a circular was issued conveying the Premier's Instruction that no documents were to be destroyed without reference to the Public Library Trustees. The first archivist was appointed to the staff of the Public Library in 1948. In 1955 a Senior Archivist was appointed and a separate Archives Section was established in 1961. The Library Council of Victoria Act 1965 introduced the first, though brief, legislative provisions for the control and preservation of public records in Victoria.

The Public Records Act 1973 came into effect on 17 April 1973. The Laverton Base Repository was acquired in 1975 and developed to ultimately house approximately 80 kilometres of public records and to provide a facility for public research. The holdings, based on the records transferred from the Archives Division of the State Library of Victoria, grew through an active transfer program. A reading room in the Melbourne CBD was established and a regional repository to serve the Victorian Central Highlands Region was established at Ballarat in 1982.

The purpose built Victorian Archives Centre (VAC) was designed and constructed in North Melbourne and all Melbourne based activities of PROV were transferred there, including the complete holdings from the Laverton Base Repository, by 2004. The VAC reading room is named after the first Keeper of Public Records, Harry Nunn OAM, and is a facility shared by PROV with the Melbourne Office of National Archives of Australia. Researchers can thus access archives of both the Victorian and Australian governments in the one reading room. The VAC repository has a potential capacity of over 120 kilometres of shelf space.

=== Senior Archivists and Keepers of Public Records ===
- 1948 Donald Baker, first Archivist at the Public Library of Victoria
- 1949 Rosemary McGowan, Archivist
- 1951 Patricia Ingham, Archivist
- 1955 Harry Nunn, Senior Archivist
- 1973 Harry Nunn, Keeper of Public Records
- 1981 Chris Hurley, Keeper of Public Records
- 1990 Loretta Hambly, Keeper of Public Records
- 1992 Ross Gibbs, Keeper of Public Records
- 2004 Justine Heazlewood, Keeper of Public Records

== Structure ==
The Public Records Act 1973 established the Public Record Office, the position of Keeper of Public Records and the Public Records Advisory Council. Subject to the general control and direction of the Minister responsible for the Public Record Office, the Keeper exercises the powers and responsibilities defined in the act. The role of the Advisory Council is, in consultation with the Keeper, to promote cooperation between PROV and public offices and to report or make recommendations to the Minister.

The Office's structure reflects the two broad areas of responsibility defined in the act, that is, a role in providing leadership and services in records management for Victorian public offices, and the preservation of and provision of access to the State's archives.

The Keeper of Public Records is able to establish standards for the management of public records and a large proportion of the Office's resources are dedicated to meeting obligations in this area. Of particular significance is the pioneering Victorian Electronic Records Strategy (VERS).

The Victorian Electronic Records Strategy (VERS) is a standard that addresses the problem of capturing, managing and preserving electronic records. The standard is set by the Public Record Office Victoria (PROV).

The other main arm of the Office is dedicated to preservation and access. Access to public records is both by traditional delivery of original records to individual researchers in PROV reading rooms and through innovative physical and online publications, exhibitions, public programs, databases and reproductions of public records.

A number of approved places of deposit have been established throughout the state under the Public Records Act 1973.

== The collection ==
With some exceptions PROV's holdings date from 1836 when Captain William Lonsdale was appointed as Police Magistrate and a formal government presence in the Port Phillip District of the Colony of New South Wales, as Victoria was then known, was established. PROV's holdings include most 19th and 20th century central correspondence systems for major Victorian public offices as well as records of:

- courts, tribunals, royal commissions etc.
- municipalities and other local governing bodies
- statutory authorities such as the State Electricity Commission of Victoria and the State Bank of Victoria
- police, prisons and health and welfare institutions
- education, immigration, Aboriginal affairs, Crown land, infrastructure
- etc.

Records associated with both the Kelly Gang outbreak and the Eureka Stockade uprising are available online and have been added to the UNESCO Australian Memory of the World Register.

Members of the public can contribute to their knowledge of Victorian history to the Public Record Office Victoria's Wiki, through editing articles, uploading and transcribing digitized images of records.
