= List of Charles Sturt University people =

This is an incomplete list of Charles Sturt University people, including alumni and staff.

== Alumni ==
=== Government ===
==== Politicians ====
- Ivan Dean, Tasmanian Independent politician and former Mayor of Launceston
- David Elliott, current Member of the New South Wales Legislative Assembly
- Jenny Gardiner, National Party politician
- John Lee Ka-chiu, Chief Executive of Hong Kong; former Chief Secretary and Secretary for Security
- Sussan Ley, current Liberal politician
- ʻIsileli Pulu, Tongan politician
- Christine Robertson, former Labor politician
- David Simmons, former Member of the House of Representatives
- Kelly Marsh Taitano, Guamanian politician

==== Civil servants ====
- Robert Atkinson, former Queensland police commissioner
- Ken Moroney, former New South Wales police commissioner

=== Humanities ===
==== Arts ====
- Violeta Ayala, Indigenous film director, producer and writer
- Stuart Beattie, screenwriter and film director
- Natasha Beaumont, actress
- Mez Breeze, artist
- Laura Brown, a fashion journalist
- Greg Carey, voice actor
- Anja Coleby, television actress and presenter
- Brendan Cowell, actor
- Shokufeh Kavani, artist, author and translator
- Scott McGregor, actor and television presenter
- James McTeigue, film director
- Blair Milan, actor and television presenter
- Jack Yabsley, actor and television presenter

==== History ====
- James Page, educationalist and anthropologist

==== Journalism and media ====
- Amelia Adams
- Samantha Armytage
- Edwina Bartholomew
- Chris Bath
- Natarsha Belling
- Tara Brown
- Latika Bourke
- Anna Coren
- Andrew Denton
- Melissa Doyle
- Amanda Keller
- Deborah Knight
- Allison Langdon
- Hamish Macdonald
- Marguerite McKinnon
- Kathryn Robinson
- Chris Roe
- Jessica Rowe
- Rachael Treasure
- Jacinta Tynan

==== Literature, writing and poetry ====
- Amanda Howard, true crime writer and serial killer specialist
- Michaeley O'Brien, screenwriter
- Charlotte Wood

==== Philosophy and theology ====
- Jeffrey Driver, Anglican Archbishop of Adelaide
- James Haire, theologian

=== Law ===
- Hon. Justice Carolyn Chalmers Simpson, Judge of the Supreme Court of New South Wales

=== Science ===
- Anika Molesworth, agroecology scientist
- Meredith Mitchell, agronomist

=== Sport ===
- Ellie Brush, soccer player
- Caitlin De Wit, wheelchair basketball player
- Ben Fixter, AFL footballer
- Stuart Karppinen, cricketer
- Ross Reynolds, Australian Rugby Union Wallaby
- Dean Windsor, professional cyclist

=== Other ===
- Afu Billy, Solomon Islands women's rights activist
- Blandina Khondowe, Miss Malawi 2002, breast-cancer awareness activist
- Craig Steven Wright, Australian computer scientist and businessman associated with cryptocurrency
- Dylan O'Donnell, IT entrepreneur and astrophotographer

== Administration ==
=== Chancellors ===
Order	Chancellor	Term start	Term end	Time in office	Notes
1	David Asimus AO	19 July 1989	2002	12–13 years	
2	Lawrie Willett AO	December 2002	2 December 2014	12 years, 1 day	
3	Michele Allan	3 December 2014	incumbent	11 years, 292 days	

=== Vice-Chancellors ===
Order	Vice-Chancellor	Term start	Term end	Time in office	Notes
1	Cliff Blake AO	1 May 1990	2001	10–11 years	
2	Ian Goulter AM	2001	31 December 2011	9–10 years	
3	Andrew Vann	1 January 2011	31 December 2020	9 years, 365 days	
acting	John Germov	1 January 2021	31 August 2021	242 days	
4	Renée Leon	1 September 2021	incumbent	5 years, 21 days	

== Faculty ==
Notable past and current faculty members include:

- Tara Brabazon, education academic
- Les Bursill, indigenous historian, archaeologist and anthropologist
- Mary Carroll (academic), library and information studies academic
- David Denholm, author, historian
- Jeffrey Driver, Anglican Archbishop of Adelaide
- Clive Hamilton, public intellectual and ethicist
- Elery Hamilton-Smith, environmental scholar and academic
- Tom Lowrie, education academic
- Hugh Mackay, social researcher
- Pru Mitchell, education librarian
- Benjamin Myers, theologian
- Faye McMillan, Indigenous health academic
- John Painter, theologian
- Thomas Pogge, philosopher
- Anantanarayanan Raman, Professor of Ecology
- Steve Redhead, sports media academic
- Aunty Isabel Reid, services to Indigenous students, recipient of an Order of the Companion of Charles Sturt University
- Emma Rush, philosopher and ethicist
- Dirk Spennemann, cultural heritage academic
- John Weckert, philosopher
- John Williams, hydrology scientist
