= Thomas Lowrie =

Thomas Lowrie may refer to:

- Tom Lowrie (1896–1944), Australian rules football player
- Tommy Lowrie (1928–2009), Scottish footballer
- Tom Lowrie (professor), University of Canberra

== See also ==
- Thomas Lowry (disambiguation)
- Tom Lowery
