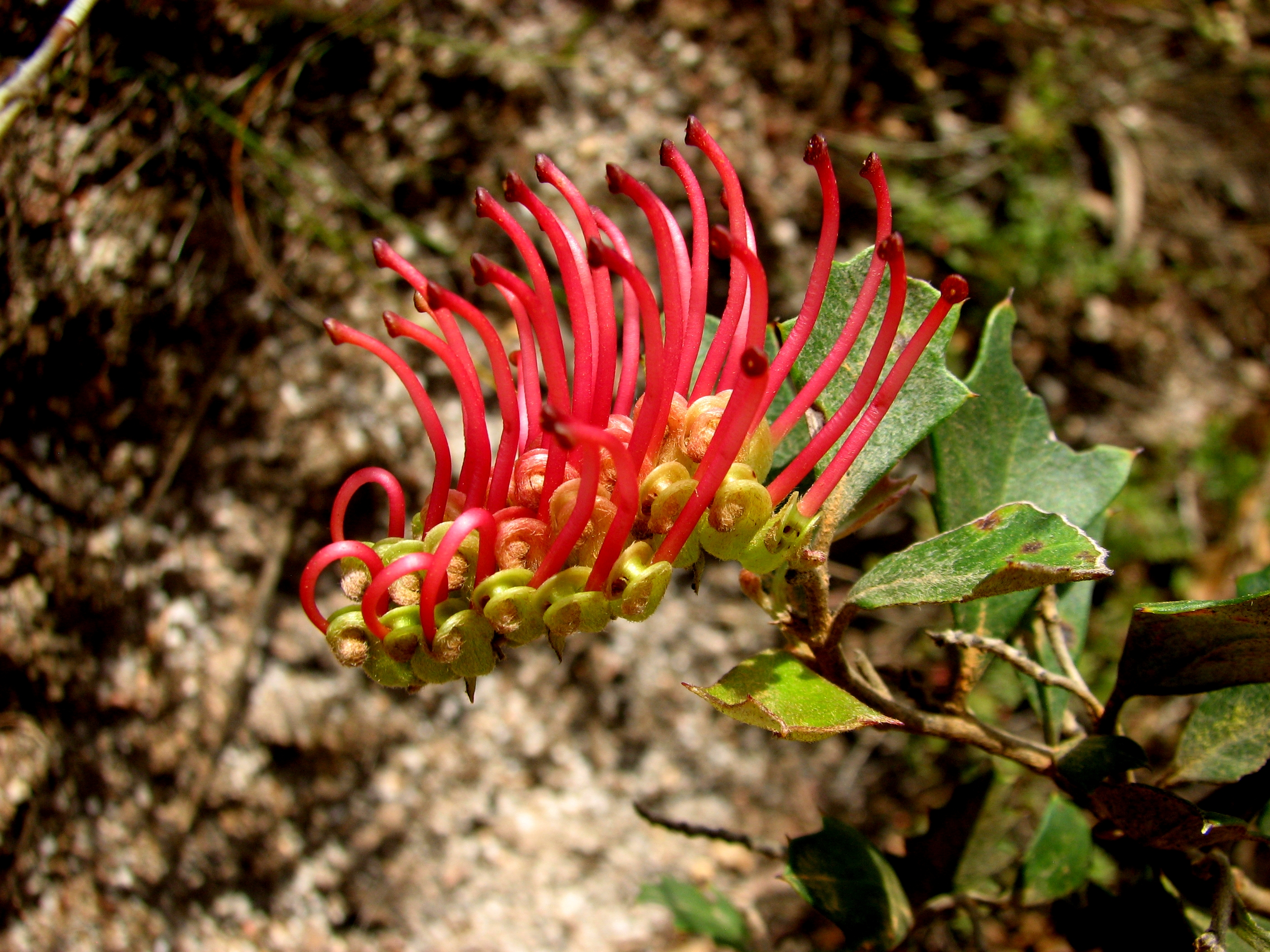
- Grevillea infecunda in Great Otway National Park

Conservation status
- Vulnerable (EPBC Act)

Scientific classification
- Kingdom: Plantae
- Clade: Embryophytes
- Clade: Tracheophytes
- Clade: Angiosperms
- Clade: Eudicots
- Order: Proteales
- Family: Proteaceae
- Genus: Grevillea
- Species: G. infecunda

Binomial name
- Grevillea infecunda McGill.

= Grevillea infecunda =

Anglesea grevillea

Species of shrub endemic to Victoria, Australia

Grevillea infecunda, commonly known as Anglesea grevillea, is a species of flowering plant in the family Proteaceae and is endemic to a restricted area of southern Victoria in Australia.

== Description ==
Grevillea infecunda is a low-lying to weakly erect shrub that typically grows to a height of 0.3–1.2 m (1 ft 0 in – 3 ft 11 in). It has hairy branchlets and grows from root suckers. The leaves are egg-shaped to oblong in outline, 30–70 mm (1.2–2.8 in) long and divided, with three to sixteen triangular to rounded teeth or lobes. The end lobes are rigid, 6–15 mm (0.24–0.59 in) long and 7–10 mm (0.28–0.39 in) wide, and sharply-pointed.

The flowers are arranged in clusters on a 20–40 mm (0.79–1.57 in)-long rachis, and are greenish yellow, ageing to orange or reddish. The pistil is 18–26 mm (0.71–1.02 in) long and the style is greenish-yellow or dull pink. Flowering occurs from October to December but the plant is not known to produce fruit.

== Taxonomy ==
Grevillea infecunda was first formally described in 1986 by Donald McGillivray, in his book New Names in Grevillea (Proteaceae), from specimens collected in the Anglesea district in 1969 by James Hamlyn Willis. The specific epithet, infecunda, means "unfruitful".

== Distribution and habitat ==
Anglesea grevillea grows in forest and woodland, and is currently only known from the Anglesea area, although old records suggest that the species was once found 100 km (62 mi) east of Anglesea.

== Conservation status ==
Grevillea infecunda is listed as 'Vulnerable' under the Australian Government Environment Protection and Biodiversity Conservation Act and the Department of Sustainability and Environment's Advisory List of Rare Or Threatened Plants In Victoria, and a National Recovery Plan has been prepared. The species is listed as 'Endangered' in Victoria under the Flora and Fauna Guarantee Act 1988 The main threats to the species include recreational activities such as the use of off-road vehicles, horse-riding and camping.
