= Richard Davis (photographer) =

British photographer (born 1965)

Richard Davis (born 1965) is a British, social documentary and portrait photographer, based in North West England. Zines of his work have been published by Café Royal Books. A series of Davis' photographs of Hulme Crescents, from the 1980s are held at the John Rylands Research Institute and Library at the University of Manchester.

== Life and work ==
Davis was born in Birmingham. He moved from Birmingham to study photography at Manchester Polytechnic (now Manchester Metropolitan University) in 1988. Whilst living in the city, he documented life in the inner-city area of Hulme, its huge brutalist inspired concrete Crescents, as well as its many characters that inhabited the flats, many of which were squatters. He also photographed Madchester musicians as well as made early portraits of comedians Steve Coogan and Caroline Aherne along with poet Lemn Sissay. Davis also photographed Nirvana live on their first tour of the UK in 1989, photographs which were used in the BBC Two documentary film, When Nirvana Came to Britain.

In the early 1990s Davis worked with author Steve Redhead on a project called Football With Attitude, his photographs making the links between music, football and fashion. More recently, Davis made a series of portraits of Mancunians under the Mancunian Way; a document of life around Gravelly Hill Interchange—the original spaghetti junction—in Birmingham; and a set of photographs capturing life in the coastal resort of Morecambe.

== Publications ==
=== Books by Davis ===
- The Mancunian Way (2019, Modernist Society)
- Hulme (Manchester) (2023, Revelations 23; ISBN 978-1-874171-12-6; with a foreword by Mark Hoyle)
- Mancunian Way (2024, Modernist; with an introduction by LoneLady and poems by Helen Angell)
- Spaghetti Junction (2024, Modernist; with an introduction by Tom Hicks and poems by Helen Angell)

=== Zines by Davis ===
- Hulme 1980s–90s (2019, Café Royal)
- Tales From The Second Cities Manchester 1988–1992 (2020, Café Royal)
- Tales From The Second Cities Birmingham 1985–88 (2020, Café Royal)
- Football Fans 1991 (2021, Café Royal)
- The Madchester Years 1989–91 (2022, Café Royal)
- The Post-Punk Years 1988–1991 (2022, Café Royal)
- Berlin December 1989 (2022, Café Royal)
- MUFC Rotterdam 91 (2023, Lower Block)
- Eastlands MCR 2023 (2023, Lower Block)
- Cityzens of Manchester (2023, Lower Block)
- Going to the Match (2024, Lower Block)
- Match of the Day, Elland Road, Leeds 1991 (2025, Café Royal)

=== Books with others ===
- Football With Attitude. By Steve Redhead. Wordsmith, 1991. ISBN 187320504X.

== Exhibitions ==
=== Solo exhibitions ===
- This Nations Saving Grace, Midlands Art Centre, Birmingham, 1989
- Entertainment UK, Cornerhouse Bar, Manchester, 1991; The Green Room, Manchester, 1991; Midlands Art Centre, Birmingham, 1991/92
- Football With Attitude, Righton Building, Manchester Polytechnic, 1991
- Under Morecambe Skies, The Dukes, Lancaster, 2011; Lancaster Library, 2011; Storey Institute, Lancaster, 2011
- In the City, Manchester Central Library, 2023
- My Brutal Life, Moore Street Substation, Sheffield, 2023

=== Group exhibitions and exhibitions as part of festivals ===
- Portraiture - Past & Present, The Dukes, Lancaster, 2013
- Streets in the Sky, Bonded Warehouse, Manchester (Photo North Festival), 2022

== Collections ==
Davis' work is held in the following permanent collection:

- John Rylands Research Institute and Library, University of Manchester: 35 photographs taken in Hulme

== General references ==
- "Capturing Hulme's 'inspiration and get up and go energy'". BBC News. 25 August 2019.
- Birmingham Mail by Thomas Fair - 1 July 2022 Late 80s snaps of Birmingham by Richard Davis
