= Rick Stein's Australia =

Culinary travel documentary TV series

Rick Stein's Australia is a six-part BBC Two television series that premiered on January 6, 2026. In this culinary travel documentary, British chef Rick Stein returns to Australia to explore its evolving food culture through a nearly 5,000 km road trip across New South Wales.

In the series, Stein revisits familiar places, reconnects with old friends, and discovers new culinary influences.The focus is on everyday cooking rather than fine dining, with emphasis on seafood, Indigenous ingredients and techniques, migrant traditions, and the influence of land, sea, and history on Australian cuisine.

Episodes explore regions including Sydney, the Central Coast, Hawkesbury River area, North Coast, Outback plains, Riverina, and other coastal spots, featuring encounters with chefs, foragers, producers, and First Nations custodians.
