= Braham Stevens =

Australian artist

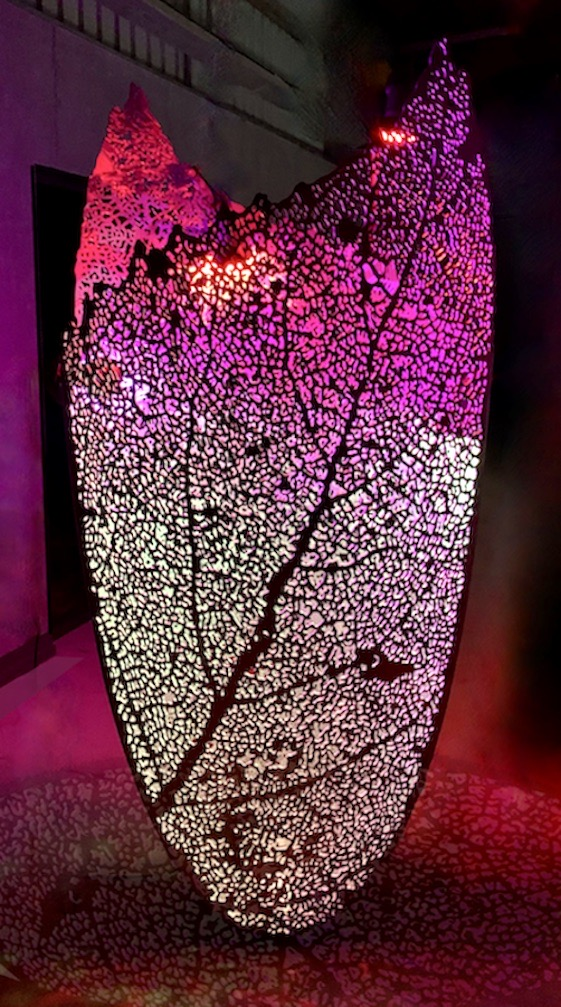
Synthesis, 2023.

Braham Stevens (born 1970) is an Australian artist whose work is influenced by environmental processes and the interrelationship between people, places, environment and culture.

He is best known for his site-specific large-scale works of public art that are conceived to engage with their surroundings - such as Embrace Cairns performing arts precinct, Reflection at James Cook University, Drift Wellington Point Brisbane, Into the Blue City of Rockingham Foreshore, Western Australia, Guulbughul Reconciliation Rocks Cape York and Eye on the Horizon at Port Kembla, Headland Wollongong.

== Career - major public artwork commissions ==
Stevens' diverse multi-disciplinary professional career has transversed multiple mediums, scale, techniques and dynamic processes, he has exhibited in Australia and Internationally since the 1990's, his most prominent public works include:

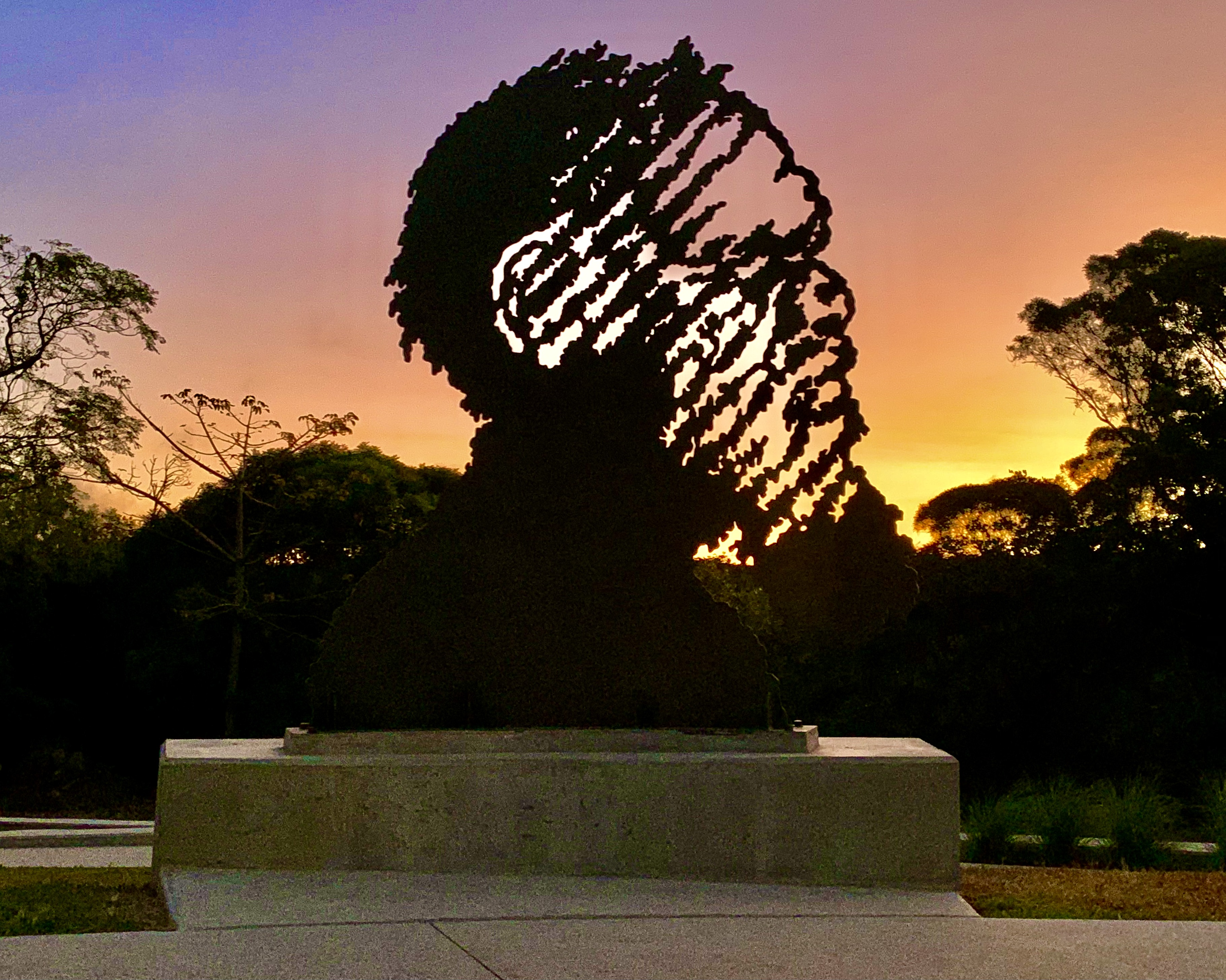
- Bama-ngay Ancestral Elder, 2021 - Reconciliation Rocks Cape York.
  EMBRACE & REFLECTION - In 2016 Stevens was commissioned by the City of Cairns to create a 9m and 5m high linking public art installation that celebrated the ongoing interrelationship between James Cook University and the City
- DRIFT - Sand, Sea & Sky - In 2018 Stevens’ Abstract Triptych Concept based on Stingrays won the national competition for the gateway commission to Stradbroke Island Brisbane.
- INTO THE BLUE - In 2019 Stevens was commissioned to create an iconic foreshore precinct sculpture for the City of Rockingham Western Australia. It was modelled on an eagle ray, prominently positioned and 6m high
- GUULBUGHUL (all together) - In late 2020 Stevens was commissioned by the Bama-ngay Traditional Custodians and Elders to create a Landmark Installation for the Heritage Listed Reconciliation Rocks Cultural Precinct in Cape York Far North Queensland. His collaboration with LA3 landscape architects being awarded the Landscape Institute of Architects Australia best cultural project in 2022
- EYE ON THE HORIZON - In mid 2021 Stevens was awarded a national commission from the Federal Government to design a landmark World War II commemorative artwork for the City of Wollongong NSW.
