= Department of Environment and Primary Industries =

Department overview
- Preceding agencies: Department of Primary Industries; Department of Sustainability and Environment
- Superseding agencies: Department of Environment, Land, Water and Planning; Department of Economic Development, Jobs, Transport and Resources
- Jurisdiction: Victoria
- Headquarters: 8 Nicholson Street, East Melbourne, Victoria, Australia
- Department executive: Adam Fennessy, Secretary
- Website: http://www.depi.vic.gov.au/
- Agency ID: PROV VA 5002

The Department of Environment and Primary Industries (DEPI) was a state government department responsible for protecting the environment, boosting productivity in Victoria's food and fibre sector, management of natural resources and managing water resources in the state of Victoria, Australia. It was created in April 2013 by merging the Department of Primary Industries with the Department of Sustainability and Environment.

The Department secretary was Adam Fennessy.

After the 2014 Victorian State Election, Premier Daniel Andrews announced that the department would be renamed to the Department of Environment, Land, Water and Planning (DELWP) effective 1 January 2015. The Agriculture portfolio was moved to the new Department of Economic Development, Jobs, Transport and Resources.

== See also ==
- Meredith Mitchell, Pasture agronomist
