= Department of Primary Industries (Victoria) =

State government department, Victoria, Australia

Department of Primary Industries Victoria
Agency overview
- Formed: 2002
- Preceding agency: Department of Natural Resources and Environment
- Dissolved: 2013
- Type: Department
- Jurisdiction: Victoria
- Headquarters: 1 Spring Street, Melbourne, Victoria, Australia
- Ministers responsible: Hon Peter Walsh, Minister for Agriculture and Food Security; Hon Michael O'Brien, Minister for Energy and Earth Resources
- Agency executive: Jeff Rosewarne, Departmental Secretary
- Website: http://www.dpi.vic.gov.au/
- Agency ID: PROV VA 4563

The Department of Primary Industries (DPI) was a government agency responsible for agriculture, biosecurity, fisheries, earth resources, energy and forestry policy and programs in the Australian state of Victoria from 2002 to 2013.

== History ==
The Department of Primary Industries was established in 2002. It was formed from a split of the Department of Natural Resources and Environment (1996–2002) into the Department of Sustainability and Environment and the Department of Primary Industries.

In 2012 DPI created the Game Council of Victoria to with the Bureau of Animal Welfare and organisations such as Field and Game Australia to manage sustainable and responsible hunting in Victoria.

The Department of Primary Industries was merged back with the Department of Sustainability and Environment to form the Department of Environment and Primary Industries in April 2013.

== Responsibilities ==
DPI had primary responsibility for administering legislation governing agriculture, animal welfare, fisheries, hunting and energy and earth resources in Victoria. The department administered and responded to queries regarding 38 major Acts and was responsible for collecting fees under regulations for fishing licences, mining rights, and exploration licences.

The department worked with energy companies, research partners, primary producers, mineral explorers and rural communities across Victoria, as well as other state and federal government departments, to address the major and emerging challenges in sustainability and productivity. DPI's core services included policy development; regulation and compliance; science, research and development; and sustainable practice change.

== Structure ==
The department was led by a Secretary who was appointed by the Premier of Victoria. DPI supported two Ministerial portfolios, the Minister for Agriculture and Food Security the Hon Peter Walsh and the Minister for Energy and Resources, the Hon Nicholas Kotsiras.

The department was structured into five broad groups around its key areas of responsibility:

- Energy and Earth Resources Group
- Agriculture Research and Development Group
- Agriculture and Fisheries Services Group
- Policy and Strategy Group
- Business and Corporate Services Group

The department also oversaw policy on responsible pet ownership in Victoria through its Bureau of Animal Welfare branch.
