= Meredith Mitchell =

Australian agronomist

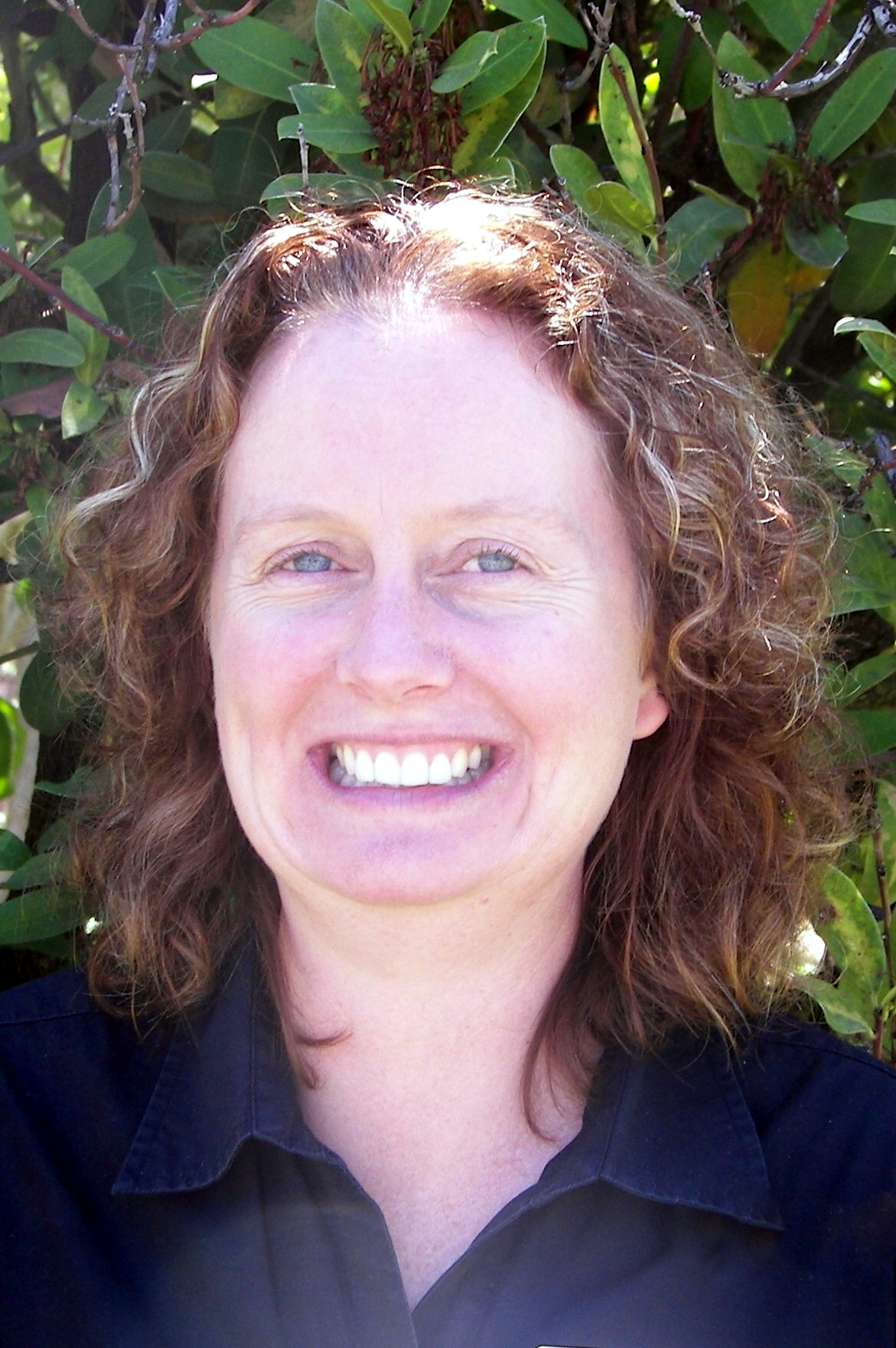
A picture depicted Meredith Mitchell an Australian pasture agronomist

Dr Meredith Leigh Mitchell an Australian agronomist. She is a senior research scientist with the Victorian Department of Environment and Primary Industries.

== Career ==
Meredith has worked for the Department of Environment and Primary Industries and been based at Rutherglen for the last 25 years. She is a pasture agronomist and her research has focused on the selection of native grass cultivars for agricultural systems and the management of existing native pastures. Mitchell was part of the successful LIGULE native grass selection project, from which six native grass cultivars have been released.

Meredith has participated in a number of multi-disciplinary teams, collaborating with agricultural scientists from different state departments and universities throughout Australia. This research has involved national germplasm by environment trials on a range of both native (NLIGN) and introduced species. Mitchell was part of the CRC for Plant Based Management of Dryland Salinity and part of the Future Farm Industries CRC.

Meredith has published an identification book on native grasses, which is currently in its third edition, and has co-authored two book chapters on native pastures.

Meredith received her PhD in 2013 from Charles Sturt University. The research focused on Microlaena (Microlaena stipoides var. stipoides) a native perennial grass that is widespread in native pastures of the temperate high rainfall zone (> 550 mm AAR) of south-eastern Australia. The thesis addressed the underlying ecology of the species and examines those attributes which allow it to be sustained and increased in grazed native pastures. A greater understanding of species ecology will allow better optimisation of its contribution to the provision of feed and ground cover. To undertake this postgraduate training, Mitchell was supported by a scholarship from Charles Sturt University, a top up scholarship from FFI CRC and a DPI postgraduate award. Mitchell also received a Fellowship from AW Howard Memorial Trust.

Meredith was a Proof site leader on the EverGraze project. EverGraze is seeking to develop new farming systems for the high rainfall zone (>550 mm) based on deep rooted perennial pastures that significantly increase wool and livestock producers' profits, while stabilising or enhancing natural resource management (NRM) outcomes. This research has focused on the effects of grazing management on the production, botanical composition and nutritive characteristics of perennial native pastures using a breeding merino ewes.
