= Thomas Lowry (disambiguation) =

Thomas Lowry (1843–1909) was an American businessman.

Thomas Lowry may also refer to:

- Martin Lowry (1874–1936), English chemist, full name Thomas Martin Lowry
- Thomas P. Lowry (1932–2023), American physician and writer
- Thomas Lowry (racehorse breeder) (1865–1944), New Zealand racehorse breeder
- Tom Lowry (1898–1976), New Zealand cricketer
- Tommy Lowry (1945–2015), English footballer

== See also ==
- Tom Lowery (born 1997), English footballer
- Thomas Lowrie (disambiguation)
