= Pru Mitchell =

Education librarian and Wikimedian

- Pru Mitchell in November 2014
- Education: University of South Australia Dip.Teaching (Early Childhood Education); Charles Sturt University (GradDipLib&InfoStudies); Charles Sturt University (MEd); Central Queensland University (GradCertSchMgt)
- Occupations: Librarian, Wikimedian
- Employer(s): Australian Council for Educational Research; Charles Sturt University
- Title: Manager Information Services

Pru Mitchell is an Australian librarian, researcher and Wikimedian. She is recognised for her contributions to education and research in the field of library and information science, and for her leadership in the Wikimedia movement.

== Education and career ==
Mitchell's educational qualifications include a Bachelor of Education (BEd), a graduate diploma in library and information science (GradDipLib&InfSc) completed in 1985, a Master of Education (MEd), and a graduate certificate in school management (GradCertSchMgt).

Mitchell started her career as an early childhood teacher and a teacher librarian. She has worked in school, TAFE and university libraries in South Australia, Western Australia and Victoria. Mitchell joined the Australian Council for Educational Research (ACER) in 2014, and is the Manager, Information Services in ACER's Cunningham Library. She is also an adjunct lecturer in the School of Information and Communications Studies at Charles Sturt University (CSU). She is on the Advisory Board for Teacher Librarianship at CSU.

=== Wikimedia Australia ===
Mitchell at Wikimedia Australia Wikicon in Adelaide, SA in 2024.

Mitchell is a long-time volunteer with Wikimedia with a particular focus on Wikimedia outreach, education and libraries. A member of Wikimedia Australia since 2008, she served on the association's board from 2013-2023, including as president (2017–2020) and Treasurer (2020–2023). Her contributions include introducing new editors to Wikipedia and Wikidata, hosting edit-a-thons for initiatives including Art+Feminism and Know My Name, supporting wiki projects such as the Wikidata WikiProject Library and Information Science, and education and outreach activities across the Galleries, Libraries, Archives and Museums (GLAM) sector.

== Awards ==
Mitchell was the winner of the Australian School Library Association (ASLA) Citation Award for 2011 for 'outstanding leadership in promoting and developing teacher librarianship'.

In 2022, she was conferred the distinction of Fellow of the Australian Library and Information Association (ALIA). Fellowships are conferred by the ALIA Board of directors on a member who has reached an 'exceptionally high standard of proficiency and has made a distinguished contribution to the theory or practice of library and information science'. Mitchell was recognised for her contribution to education and research and her leadership in the areas of digital repositories, collection management and open education resources.

In 2025, Mitchell was the inaugural winner of the Victorian Library and Information Award. This award recognises individuals for 'exceptional achievements, innovation and commitment'.

In 2026, Mitchell received Wikimedia Australia's Craig Franklin Award, in recognition of the positive impact she has made on the Wikimedia movement in Australia.

== Select publications ==
- Mroczek, K., Mitchell, P., McSharry, B. P., Woods, A., Spry, B., Paustian, T., & Vanniasinkam, T. (2025). Development and evaluation of a Wikipedia based group assessment to enhance science communication. Frontiers in Education, 10, 1-10. Article 1620804. https://doi.org/10.3389/feduc.2025.1620804
- Hider, P., Mitchell, P., & Parkes, R. (2019). Measuring the value of professional indexing. Information Research, 24(3), 2-14.
- Hider, P., Mitchell, P., Galatis, H., & McDowell , K. (2017). Developing an effective, accessible and sustainable digital repository of OLT learning and teaching resources: Final report. Australian Government Office for Learning and Teaching.
- Hider, P., Spiller, B., Mitchell, P., Parkes, R., & Macaulay, R. (2016). Enhancing a subject vocabulary for Australian education. Indexer, 34(1), 25-33. https://doi.org/10.3828/indexer.2016.6
- Hider, P., Dalgarno, B., Bennett, S., Liu, Y.-H., Gerts, C., Daws, C., Spiller, B., Mitchell, P., Parkes, R., & Macaulay, R. (2016). Reindexing a research repository from the ground up: Adding and evaluating quality metadata. Australian Academic and Research Libraries, 47(2), 61-75. https://doi.org/10.1080/00048623.2016.1204589
- O'Connell, J., Bales, J., & Mitchell, P. (2015). [R]Evolution in reading cultures: 2020 vision for school libraries. Australian Library Journal, 64(3), 194-207. https://doi.org/10.1080/00049670.2015.1048043
- Hider, P., Liu, Y.-H., Gerts, C., Daws, C., Dalgarno, B., Bennett, S., Spiller, B., Parkes, R., Knight, P., Mitchell, P., Macaulay, R., & Carlson, L. (2015). Developing a schema for describing the contents of the office for learning and teaching's resource library. Australian Academic and Research Libraries, 46(3), 151-163. https://doi.org/10.1080/00048623.2015.1030846
- O'Connell, J., Bales, J., & Mitchell, P. (2015). Literature in digital environments: Changes and emerging trends in Australian school libraries. In L. Das, S. Brand-Gruwel, K. Kok, & J. Walhout (Eds.), 2015: IASL Conference Proceedings (Maastricht, Netherlands): The School Library Rocks: Living it, Learning it, Loving it (pp. 324–337). International Association of School Librarianship. https://doi.org/10.29173/iasl7467
- Hider, P., Spiller, B., Mitchell, P., Parkes, R., & Macaulay, R. (2015). Towards a New Library of Resources for Higher Education Learning and Teaching. In Proceedings of THETA 2015 : Create, Connect, Consume - Innovating today for tomorrow (pp. 1–16). Council of Australasian University Directors of Information Technology.
