= Emma Rush =

Philosopher

- Education: Department of Philosophy/Centre for Applied Philosophy and Public Ethics, University of Melbourne
- Known for: Reports for The Australia Institute
- Scientific career
- Workplaces: Charles Sturt University Faculty of Arts, School of Humanities and Social Sciences
- Thesis: Consume with care: ethics, economics and industrialised world over-consumption (2004)
- Website: Official website

Emma Rush is a lecturer in philosophy and ethics at Charles Sturt University Faculty of Arts, School of Humanities and Social Sciences, notable for her work on sexualization of children.

In 2006, Rush worked on a series of reports for The Australia Institute. Two of the reports which she co-authored led to a senate inquiry into the sexualisation of children.

Rush has also been consulted by the media, including Australia's ABC News and The Sydney Morning Herald.

== Research ==
Rush's main areas of research are: ethics in public life, particularly, sexualisation of children and the corporatisation of child care; professional ethics, particularly social work ethics, with a developing project on resilience; and environmental ethics.

== Media ==
Rush has acted as a media consultant over issues relating to sexualisation, advertising and pornography debates by ABC Radio, Australia, ABC News, Australia, The Sydney Morning Herald, The Conversation, and Melinda Tankard Reist's website.

== Selected bibliography ==
=== Ph.D thesis ===
- Rush, Emma (September 2006). Consume with care: ethics, economics and industrialised world over-consumption (Ph.D. thesis). Melbourne: Department of Philosophy/Centre for Applied Philosophy and Public Ethics, University of Melbourne. OCLC 224910719.

=== 2006 papers for The Australia Institute ===
2006 discussion papers for the Australia Institute

- Rush, Emma (April 2006). "Child care quality in Australia (discussion paper number 84)". Population Ageing: Crisis or Transition?. Canberra: The Australia Institute. ISSN 1322-5421. OCLC 156571048. Pdf version.
- Rush, Emma; Downie, Christian (June 2006). "ABC learning centres: a case-study of Australia's largest child care corporation (discussion paper number 87)". Population Ageing: Crisis or Transition?. Canberra: The Australia Institute. ISSN 1322-5421. OCLC 156757390. Pdf version.
- Rush, Emma; La Nauze, Andrea (October 2006). "Corporate paedophilia: the sexualisation of children in Australia (discussion paper number 90)". Population Ageing: Crisis or Transition?. Canberra: The Australia Institute. ISSN 1322-5421. OCLC 156752334. Pdf version.
- Rush, Emma; La Nauze, Andrea (December 2006). "Letting children be children: stopping the sexualisation of children in Australia (discussion paper number 93)". Population Ageing: Crisis or Transition?. Canberra: The Australia Institute. ISSN 1322-5421. OCLC 225513585. Pdf version.

2006 web papers for the Australia Institute

- Rush, Emma (February 2006). Skip dipping in Australia (web paper number 85). Canberra: The Australia Institute. OCLC 224947742. Pdf version.
- Rush, Emma (April 2006). Skip dipping in Australia (web paper number 85). Canberra: The Australia Institute. OCLC 224947742. Pdf version.
- Rush, Emma; Hamilton, Clive (September 2006). The attitudes of Australians to happiness and social well-being (web paper number 90). Canberra: The Australia Institute. OCLC 225280784. Pdf version.

=== Chapters in books ===
- Rush, Emma (2007), "Plastic fantastic: the sexualisation of children", in Fleetwood, Julian (ed.), The sex mook: what is our sex?, Melbourne, Australia: Vignette Press, pp. 108–110, ISBN 9781876110000
- Rush, Emma (2007), "Employees' views on quality", in Hill, Elizabeth; Pocock, Barbara; Elliott, Alison (eds.), Kids count: better early childhood education and care in Australia, Sydney, Australia: Sydney University Press, pp. 154–178, ISBN 9781920898700
- Rush, Emma (2009), "What are the risks of premature sexualisation for children?", in Tankard Reist, Melinda (ed.), Getting real: challenging the sexualisation of girls, Melbourne, Australia: Spinifex Press, pp. 41–54, ISBN 9781876756758
- Rush, Emma (2012), "Children, media and ethics", in Warburton, Wayne; Braunstein, Danya (eds.), Growing up fast and furious, Sydney, Australia: The Federation Press, pp. 159–174, ISBN 9781862878235
- Rush, Emma (2013), "Ethics of food security", in Farmar-Bowers, Quentin; Higgins, Vaughan; Millar, Joanne (eds.), Food security in Australia: challenges and prospects for the future, New York: Springer, pp. 35–48, ISBN 9781461444831
- Rush, Emma (2015), "(Applied) ethics", in Handsley, Elizabeth; MacDougall, Colin; Rich, Michael (eds.), Children's wellbeing in the media age: multidisciplinary perspectives from the Harvard-Australia Symposium, Sydney: The Federation Press, pp. 56–76, ISBN 9781760020286
- Rush, Emma; Anscombe, A.W. (Bill) (2017), "Respect and integrity – John Gavaghan", in Pawar, Manohar S.; Hugman, Richard; Alexandra, Andrew; Anscombe, A.W. (eds.), Empowering social workers: virtuous practitioners, Singapore: Springer, pp. 77–86, ISBN 9789811038099
- Rush, Emma; Anscombe, A.W. (Bill) (2017), "What can we do to make changes? – Virginia (Ginni) Hall, AO", in Pawar, Manohar S.; Hugman, Richard; Alexandra, Andrew; Anscombe, A.W. (eds.), Empowering social workers: virtuous practitioners, Singapore: Springer, pp. 87–99, ISBN 9789811038099
- Rush, E., Short, M., Burningham, G., Cartledge, J. (2020). ‘Philosophy and ethics: Sustaining social inclusion in the disability sector’. In Crisp, B.R. and Taket, A. (Eds.), Sustaining Social Inclusion, Routledge, pp. 203–217. ISBN (electronic) 9780429397936

=== Journal articles ===
- Rush, Emma; Gleeson, Brendan; Low, Nicholas (2005). "A multivalent conception of path dependence: The case of transport planning in metropolitan Melbourne, Australia". Environmental Sciences. 2 (4): 391–408. Bibcode:2005JIES....2..391L. doi:10.1080/15693430500405146.
- Rush, Emma (December 2011). "Response to Taylor: the full picture of the sexualisation debate". Australasian Journal of Early Childhood. 36 (4): 111–119. doi:10.1177/183693911103600415. ISSN 1836-9391. S2CID 146453273.
- Rush, Emma; Mungai, Ndungi wa; Wairire, Gidraph G. (2014). "The challenges of maintaining social work ethics in Kenya". Ethics and Social Welfare. 8 (2): 170–186. doi:10.1080/17496535.2014.895401. S2CID 143642509.
- Rush, Emma (Summer 2015). "A Gaitian account of environmental ethics". Environmental Ethics. 37 (2): 187–206. Bibcode:2015EnEth..37..187R. doi:10.5840/enviroethics201537217.
- Rush, Emma; Fine, Cordelia (February 2016). ""Why does all the girls have to buy pink stuff?" The ethics and science of the gendered toy marketing debate". Journal of Business Ethics. 149 (4): 769–784. doi:10.1007/s10551-016-3080-3. S2CID 147209519.
- Strong, C. and Rush, E. (2018) Musical genius and/or nasty piece of work? Dealing with violence and sexual assault in accounts of popular music’s past, Continuum, https://doi.org/10.1080/10304312.2018.1483009.
- Short, M., Dempsey, K., Ackland, J., Rush, E., Heller, E. & Dwyer, H. (2018). What is a person? Deepening students’ and colleagues’ understanding of person-centredness, Advances in Social Work & Welfare Education, vol. 20, no.1, pp. 139–156. ISSN 1329-0584
