= Tara Brabazon =

Australian academic

Tara Brabazon AM
- Born: January 3, 1969 (age 57); Perth, Western Australia, Australia
- Occupations: Academic; columnist; writer
- Title: Professor of Cultural Studies, Flinders University; Professor of Media
- Spouse(s): Steve Redhead (m. 2002; died 2018) Jamie Quinton (m. 2019)

Academic background
- Education: University of Western Australia (M.A., B.A.); Murdoch University (Ph.D., B.Lit.Comm.); Central Queensland University (M.Litt., B.P.S.); University of New England (M.Ed.)

Academic work
- Institutions: Flinders University
- Main interests: Media literacies; popular cultural studies; creative industries; city imaging; regional development; the knowledge economy; information management; information literacy; cultural studies; negotiation of cultural difference

Tara Brabazon (born 3 January 1969) is an Australian academic who is the Professor of Cultural Studies and formerly Dean of Graduate Research at Flinders University. From 2023-24 she was a Dean at Charles Darwin University. She has worked in ten universities in the United Kingdom, Canada, Australia and New Zealand.

== Early life and education ==
Tara Brabazon was born in Perth, Western Australia, going on to write a book about its music in Liverpool of the South Seas.

- 1991 - Bachelor of Arts, First Class Honours in History; University of Western Australia.
- 1993 - Bachelor of Literature and Communication; Murdoch University.
- 1994 - Master of Arts, Passed with Distinction; University of Western Australia.
- 1995 - Master of Letters in Cultural Studies; Central Queensland University.
- 1995 - Doctor of Philosophy; Murdoch University.
- 1999 - Bachelor of Professional Education, Passed with Distinction; Central Queensland University.
- 2002 - Graduate Diploma in Internet Studies, with Distinction; Curtin University.
- 2007 - Master of Education with Honours Class 1; University of New England.
- 2016 - Le Cordon Bleu Graduate Diploma of Gastronomic Tourism; Southern Cross University.
- 2021 - Master of Leadership; Deakin University.

== Journalism ==
Brabazon is a columnist for a range of education and cultural publications. She has produced over 150 articles for the Times Higher Education, and has written for the Times Literary Supplement, Times Education Supplement, The Guardian, Arts Hub Australia, Arts Hub UK, and Campus Review, also featuring on the cover of a 2019 edition. She has been profiled in a range of publications, including The Guardian.

== Research ==
Brabazon's key areas of research include media literacies, popular cultural studies, creative industries, city imaging, regional development, the knowledge economy, information management, information literacy, cultural studies and the negotiation of cultural difference. Concepts she has developed include "the Google Effect," "Digital Dieting", and the 3Ds (digitization, disintermediation and deterritorialization). Brabazon is also continuing the work of the late Professor Steve Redhead by developing the "claustropolitanism" theory, as a revision of cosmopolitan sociology.

While a Professor of Media in the United Kingdom, Brabazon delivered her Inaugural Address titled "Google is White Bread of the Mind." This research was presented in her book The University of Google. She explored the development of information literacy in the first year of university degrees.

As Dean of Graduate Research, Brabazon developed a weekly vlog series for higher degree students. They currently number 300 videos, most created from requests by students.

== Recognition ==
- Member of the Order of Australia, 2019.

== Personal life ==
Brabazon married Steve Redhead in 2002. Their relationship was featured in the Times Higher Education under the title Marital Bliss. After Redhead's death from pancreatic cancer in 2018, Brabazon wrote about their relationship in the second edition of The End of the Century Party.

Brabazon is married to Jamie Quinton, Professor and Head of the School of Natural Sciences at Massey University in Aotearoa, New Zealand.

== Selected publications ==
- Tara Brabazon. 2000. Tracking the Jack: A retracing of the Antipodes. Sydney: UNSW Press.
- Tara Brabazon. 2002. Digital Hemlock: Internet education and the poisoning of teaching. Sydney: UNSW Press.
- Tara Brabazon. 2002. Ladies who Lunge: Celebrating difficult women. Sydney: UNSW Press.
- Tara Brabazon. 2005. From Revolution to Revelation: Generation X, popular culture, popular memory. Aldershot: Ashgate.
- Tara Brabazon (eds.). 2005. Liverpool of the South Seas: Perth and its popular music. Perth: UWA Press.
- Tara Brabazon. 2006. Playing on the Periphery: Sport, memory, identity. London: Routledge.
- Tara Brabazon. 2007. The University of Google: Education in the (post) information age. Aldershot: Ashgate.
- Tara Brabazon (ed.). 2008. The Revolution Will Not Be Downloaded: Dissent in the digital age. Oxford: Chandos.
- Tara Brabazon (ed.). 2008. Thinking Popular Culture: War, terrorism and writing. Aldershot: Ashgate.
- Tara Brabazon. 2010.Popular Music: Topics, trends, trajectories. London: Sage.
- Tara Brabazon (ed.). 2012. Digital Dialogues and Community 2.0: After avatars, trolls and puppets. Oxford: Chandos.
- Tara Brabazon. 2013. Digital Dieting: From information obesity to intellectual fitness. Aldershot: Ashgate.
- Tara Brabazon (ed.). 2013. City Imaging: Regeneration, renewal and decay. Berlin: Springer.
- Tara Brabazon. 2014. Unique Urbanity? Rethinking third tier cities, degeneration, regeneration and mobility. Berlin: Springer.
- Tara Brabazon, Mick Winter and Bryn Gandy. 2014. Digital Wine: How QR codes facilitate new markets for small wine industries. Berlin: Springer.
- Tara Brabazon (eds.). 2015. Play: A theory of learning and change. Berlin: Springer.
- Tara Brabazon. 2015. Enabling University: Impairment, (dis)ability and social justice in higher education. Berlin: Springer.
- Tara Brabazon, Steve Redhead and Sunny Rue Chivaura. 2018. Trump Studies: An intellectual guide to why citizens do not act in their best interests. Bingley: Emerald.
- Tara Brabazon, Tiffany Lyndall Knight, and Natalie Hills. 2020. The Creative PhD: Challenges, Opportunities and Reflexive Practice. Bingley: Emerald.
- Tara Brabazon. 2022. Twelve rules for (academic) life: A stroppy feminist's guide through teaching, learning, politics, and Jordan Peterson. Singapore: Springer.
- Tara Brabazon, 2025. Ten drafts to complete your PhD. Transition Elements Press.
- Tara Brabazon. 2025. How to embrace academic failure: Building an academic life with meaning, integrity and honesty. London: Edward Elgar.

== Audiobooks ==
Brabazon has developed new strategies for research dissemination through the audiobook, producing ten titles between 2018 and 2025.

- Trump Studies (2018)
- Memories of the Future (2019)
- Comma (2022)
- Know what you do not know: information literacy for PhD students (2023)
- The Three Wise Monkeys of Research: Epistemology / Ontology / Methodology (2023)
- 12 Rules of Academic Life (2023)
- The Pernicious PhD Supervisor (2024)
- (Re)start: Moving from Despair to Defiance (2025)
- Rescue Yourself: How to complete a PhD without a supervisor (2025)
- Setting up your life to write a PhD: Building a doctorate one sentence at a time (2025)
- How to embrace academic failure: Building an academic life with meaning, integrity and honesty (2025)
- Ten drafts to complete your PhD (2025)

This project is developing through the 'auditory academic' initiative, offering sonic activism and interventions through diverse sonic platforms. Brabazon started one of the first academic podcasts in 2010, with over 800 episodes. She has also made a spoken word contribution to Nostalgia Deathstar's 2025 album, They killed the flame. She contributed her voice to "ZU" and "ZU Too (Night of the Claustrozombies)."
