= Mary Carroll (academic) =

Australian librarian and academic

- Carroll in 2026
- Occupations: Teacher-librarian; Library educator; Academic

Academic background
- Education: BEd Melbourne Teachers' College; MEd, PhD, Charles Sturt University
- Thesis: Role perception and the library worker in Australia: the role of library education in defining roles and tasks of librarians and library technicians (2007)

Academic work
- Institutions: Charles Sturt University
- Website: https://researchoutput.csu.edu.au/en/persons/macarrolcsueduau/

Mary Carroll is an Australian librarian and academic who is an associate professor at Charles Sturt University's School of Information and Communications Studies. She has contributed to the fields of library and information science, libraries and library history, and education in the information professions. She is a former board member of the Australian Library and Information Association.

== Education and career ==
Carroll completed a Bachelor of Education (Teacher Librarianship) at Melbourne Teachers' College and a Master of Education (Language and literacy) at Charles Sturt University. In 2007, she completed a Doctor of Philosophy, also through Charles Sturt University. Her doctoral thesis, which explored the links between education and librarianship, was titled: "Role perception and the library worker in Australia: the role of library education in defining roles and tasks of librarians and library technicians".

Carroll is an associate professor in the School of Information and Communications Studies at Charles Sturt University, and she is a member of the Libraries Research Group. She is also a member of the American Library Association's Library History Round Table, and contributes to the group's blog.

Carroll's research interests include books, libraries and library history, library and information science, and education for the information professions, both in Australia and internationally, and she has published and presented in these areas throughout her career. She is on the Editorial Board of the journal Libraries: Culture, History, and Society.

In 2016, the International Federation of Library Associations and Institutions (IFLA) published a book commemorating 40 years of the association's Section on Education and Training. The volume also included regional developments from around the globe, with Carroll contributing the chapter on the history of Australian library and information science education.

Carroll was on the Australian Library and Information Association Board of Directors from 2021-2023. In 2026, she spoke at an In Conversation event with Bodleian Librarian Richard Ovenden, as part of State Library Victoria's 170th anniversary program.

== Awards ==
In 2012, Carroll was the recipient of an Early Career Research grant by the National Centre for Vocational Education Research. The study facilitated by this grant led to a report on how students of private registered training organisations us public library resource, and the implications for libraries. In 2013, Carroll received the Faculty of Education Teaching Excellence award. She was also awarded a Charles Sturt Excellence Award in 2020.

== Selected publications ==
=== Book chapters ===
- Carroll, M. (2016). "The Australian LIS education journey: From practice to profession". In M. Seadle; U. Stöckel; B. Crumpton; C. M. Chu (eds.). Educating the profession: 40 years of the IFLA section on education and training. Walter de Gruyter. pp. 302–318.
- Kennan, M. A.; Carroll, M.; Thompson, K. M. (2018). "Letting go, holding on, or re-envisioning? Challenges and opportunities for LIS Education in Australia". In J. Percell; L. C. Sarin; P. T. Jaeger; J. C. Bertot (eds.). Re-envisioning the MLS: Perspectives on the future of library and information science education. Vol. 44A. Emerald Group Publishing Limited. pp. 161–176. doi:10.1108/S0065-28302018000044A016.
- Carroll, M.; Garner, J. (2020). "Reading in Australian prisons: An exploration of motivation". In J. Rose (ed.). The Edinburgh history of reading: Subversive readers. Edinburgh University Press. pp. 31–51.

=== Journal articles ===
- Reynolds, S.; Carroll, M.; Welch, B. (2016). "Engaging with our future: The role of educators, practitioners, professional associations and employing organisations in the co-creation of information professionals". Australian Library Journal. 65 (4): 317–327. doi:10.1080/00049670.2016.1235529.
- Carroll, M.; Griffith, A. (2023). "Lost to memory and invisible stories: Reflections on the Australian Library History forums 1984–2019". Journal of the Australian Library and Information Association. 72 (1): 4–25. doi:10.1080/24750158.2023.2167190.
- Carroll, M. (2024). "A start must be made": An evaluation of the published history of women in Australian libraries". Library Trends. 72 (3): 495–524. doi:10.1353/lib.2024.a944677.
- Carroll, M.; Garrison, K.; Oddone, K.; Wakeling, S. (2024). "School libraries in Australia: A preliminary analysis of the Knowledge Bank of Australian and New Zealand School Libraries". IFLA Journal. 50 (4): 769–779. doi:10.1177/03400352241246442.
- Carroll, M.; Wakeling, S. (2024). "Staff perceptions of public library goals revisited". Library Quarterly. 94 (2): 180–201. doi:10.1086/729229.
- Carroll, M. B.; Garrison, K.; Wakeling, S.; Oddone, K.; Reynolds, S. (2025). "Documenting a profession: An exploration of the published history of school libraries and teacher librarians in Australia". History of Education Review. 54 (1/2): 17–37. doi:10.1108/her-05-2024-0022.
- Carroll, M. (2025). "Agencies of good will': Australian LIS education and the United States Office of War Information agency in World War II". Journal of the Australian Library and Information Association. 74 (4): 491–516. doi:10.1080/24750158.2025.2561423.
- Garrison, K. L.; Carroll, M.; Oddone, K.; Gagen-Spriggs, K. (2026). "School and public libraries in Australia: Essential connections, then and now". Journal of the Australian Library and Information Association. 75 (2): 256–279. doi:10.1080/24750158.2026.2647851.
