= Department of Sustainability and Environment =

Government agency overview
- Formed: 2002
- Preceding Government agency: Department of Natural Resources and Environment
- Type: Department
- Jurisdiction: Victoria
- Headquarters: 8 Nicholson Street, East Melbourne, Victoria, Australia
- Ministers responsible: Hon Ryan Smith, Minister for Environment and Climate Change; Hon Peter Walsh, Minister for Water
- Government agency executive: Greg Wilson, Departmental Secretary
- Website: http://www.dse.vic.gov.au/
- Agency ID: PROV VA 4554

Footnotes
- Merged with DPI to form DEPI

The Department of Sustainability and Environment (DSE) was a state government department that managed water resources, climate change, bushfires, public land, forests and eco systems in the state of Victoria, Australia. It was created in 2002 when the Department of Natural Resources and Environment was divided into the Department of Primary Industries and the Department of Sustainability and Environment.

The department supported and advised two Victorian ministers, the Minister for Environment and Climate Change, Ryan Smith, and the Minister for Water, Peter Walsh, and helped with the management and administration of their portfolios. The department secretary was Greg Wilson. It had 2700 staff working at 90 locations across the state.

DSE was sometimes known colloquially as the "Department of Smoke and Embers" for its role in planned burns and bushfire management.

The Department of Sustainability and Environment was merged with the Department of Primary Industries to form the Department of Environment and Primary Industries (Victoria) in April 2013.
