= Tom Lowrie (professor) =

Professor Tom Lowrie was appointed a Centenary Professor at the University of Canberra, Australia, in 2014. He has an established international research profile in the discipline area of STEM education and mathematics education.

== Career ==
Lowrie began his teaching career in 1986. He has taught in a number of primary school and university settings (including Australia, Canada, and the United States) over the past twenty years. His positions have included working as a primary school classroom teacher, teaching mathematics education and research method courses to undergraduate and postgraduate students at Charles Sturt University (CSU), and working with classroom teachers on curriculum frameworks. He received his PhD in 1996 from the University of Newcastle.

From 2007 to early 2014, Lowrie was Director of the Research Institute for Professional Practice, Learning and Education (RIPPLE), a strategic research institute at CSU which investigates the nature of professional practice and its impact and influence on industry and other professional stakeholders and communities. As Director, Lowrie coordinated and supported the research activity of key researchers and doctoral students. He also managed the international collaborations of a network of researchers contributing to the understanding and application of knowledge about professional practice.

In 2014, Lowrie was appointed as one of the University of Canberra's Centenary Professors. He works in the Faculty of Education as the Director of the STEM Education Research Centre.

== STEM Program ==
Lowrie is program director of the nationwide Early Learning STEM Australia (ELSA) program. ELSA is a play-based digital learning program for children in preschool to explore science, technology, engineering and mathematics (STEM). Lowrie's STEM Practices encourage children to ask questions, make predictions, experiment, and reflect on what happened and why. The ELSA Pilot is a key early childhood initiative of the Australian Government. In 2020, the ELSA program was awarded further funding to develop STEM curriculum for Foundation - Year 2 students throughout Australia.

== Research focus ==
Lowrie has an international research profile in the discipline area of mathematics education. His concentrated and sustained (over almost 20 years) body of work has focused on the extent to which primary-aged students use spatial reasoning and visual imagery to solve mathematics problems and the role and nature of graphics in mathematics assessment. More recently, his research has expanded to include students use of digital tools and dynamic imagery to solve problems. Lowrie received a number of grants from the Australian Research Council (ARC), amongst others.

Lowrie's research has been disseminated in national and international periodicals and conference proceedings. His work has been communicated at conferences in Australia, New Zealand, the United Kingdom, the United States, Singapore, Korea, China, Japan, Malaysia, Mexico, Greece, Indonesia, and The Netherlands. He has also been a keynote speaker at several national and international education conferences.

=== Spatial reasoning in mathematics ===
Lowrie has undertaken a number of research projects to develop spatial curriculum for promoting mathematics understanding in both primary and secondary classrooms. This modified curriculum has supported students in developing their problem-solving skills through a range of spatial activities. Lowrie's spatial curriculum has consistently led to improvements in mathematics performance for children in primary and secondary school.

=== Graphical languages in mathematics ===
Two of Lowrie's most well known studies are the ARC-funded projects: Graphical Languages in Mathematics (GLIM) [2008–11]; and Early Primary Graphical Languages in Mathematics (EPGLIM) [2009–11]—undertaken with Professor Carmel Diezmann (Queensland University of Technology, Australia). Together, the research focused on children's understanding of graphics in mathematics, specifically primary students aged 8 to 12 years. The aim of the research was to understand how children learn about general purpose graphical languages that are important in mathematics (such as graphs, diagrams, charts, tables, and maps). In this day and age, it is essential that all children have the skills to interpret the graphical languages that are such a large part of the mathematics curriculum. By monitoring the development of students' knowledge of information graphics, an understanding was formed of how children 'code-break' the different types of graphics that they encounter in their everyday mathematics lessons.

=== Processing mathematics tasks ===
From 2013 to 2015, Lowrie conducted a research project funded by the ARC on the processing of mathematics tasks. The project aimed to better understand how students process mathematics tasks so the move toward digital assessment can be managed effectively within classrooms to promote assessment for learning.

=== Social and geographic location and its impact on mathematics teaching and learning ===
Lowrie conducted research with Professor Robyn Jorgensen through an ARC grant from 2012-2014 for a large-scale mathematics research project that aims to better understand the factors that impact on student learning in mathematics, specifically teachers' practices in creating strong learning environments. The results of the study helped understanding around how social and geographic location may impact on mathematics teaching and learning.

=== Promoting mathematics engagement and learning opportunities for disadvantaged communities in West Nusa Tenggara, Indonesia ===
A $3,400,000 research project that aims to advance innovative practices that will build teachers' capacity in mathematics teaching and engage Grade 7-9 students, particularly girls, in mathematics learning in West Nusa Tenggara (NTB), Indonesia (the Country's second most disadvantaged province). The Australian Department of Foreign Affairs and Trade funded the project, from their Government Partnership for Foreign Development (GPFD) scheme. Other partners include: IKIP Mataram (The Institute of Teacher Training and Education); The Provincial Office of the Ministry of Education Sports and Youth in West Nusa Tenggara (DIKPORA); Institute for Education Quality Assurance (LPMP); and the Provincial Office of Ministry of Religion (DEPAG).

== Significant publications ==
Lowrie has published over 220 scholarly books and book chapters, refereed journal articles, and refereed conference proceedings. His recent publications include:

- Lowrie, T., Harris, D., Logan, T., & Hegarty, M. (2021). The impact of a spatial intervention program on students’ spatial reasoning and mathematics performance. The Journal of Experimental Education, 89(2), 259-277.
- Lowrie, T., Resnick, I., Harris, D., & Logan, T. (2020). In search of the mechanisms that enable transfer from spatial reasoning to mathematics understanding. Mathematics Education Research Journal, 32(2), 175-188.
- Lowrie, T. & Larkin, K. (2020). Experience, represent, apply (ERA): A heuristic for digital engagement in the early years. British Journal of Educational Technology, 51(1), 131-147.
- Lowrie, T., Logan, T., & Hegarty, M. (2019). The influence of spatial visualization training on students’ spatial reasoning and mathematics performance. Journal of Cognition and Development. https://doi.org/10.1080/15248372.2019.1653298
- Lowrie, T., Logan, T., Harris, D., & Hegarty, M. (2018). The impact of an intervention program on students' spatial reasoning: Student engagement through mathematics-enhanced learning activities. Cognitive Research: Principles and Implications. https://doi.org/10.1186/s41235-018-0147-y
- Lowrie, T., Leonard, S., & Fitzgerald, R. (2018). STEM Practices: A translational framework for large-scale STEM education design. Educational Design Research, 2(1), https://doi.org/10.15460/eder.2.1.1243
- Ramful, A., Lowrie, T., & Logan, T. (2017). Measurement of Spatial Ability: Construction and Validation of the Spatial Reasoning Instrument for Middle School Students. Journal of Psychoeducational Assessment, 35(7), 709-727.
- Lowrie, T., Logan, T., & Ramful, A. (2017). Visuospatial training improves elementary students’ mathematics performance. British Journal of Educational Psychology, 87(2), 170-186. https://doi.org/10.1111/bjep.12142
- Logan, T., Lowrie, T., & Diezmann, C. M. (2014). Co-thought gestures: Supporting students to successfully navigate map tasks. Educational Studies in Mathematics, 87(1), 87-102.
- Jorgensen, R., & Lowrie, T. (2013). Both ways strong: Using digital games to engage Aboriginal learners. International Journal of Inclusive Education, 17(2), 130-142.
- Bobis, J., Mulligan, J., & Lowrie, T. (2012). Mathematics for children: Challenging children to think mathematically (4th ed.). Frenchs Forest, NSW: Pearson Education Australia.
- Perry, B., Lowrie, T., Logan, T., Macdonald, A., & Greenlees, J. (Eds.). (2012). Research in mathematics education in Australasia 2008–2011. Rotterdam, The Netherlands: Sense Publishers.
- Diezmann, C. M., & Lowrie. T. (2012). Learning to think 'spatially': What do students 'see' in numeracy test items? International Journal of Science and Mathematics Education, 10, 1469–1490.
- Lowrie, T., Diezmann, C. M., & Logan, T. (2012). A framework for mathematics graphical tasks: The influence of the graphic element on student sense making. Mathematics Education Research Journal, 24(2), 169–187.
- Lowrie, T., & Jorgensen, R. (2012). The tyranny of remoteness: Changing and adapting pedagogical practices in distance education. International Journal of Pedagogies and Learning, 7(1), 1–8.
- Lowrie, T., Diezmann, C. M., & Kay, R. (2011). The development of the Graphics-Decoding Proficiency Instrument. Evaluation and Research in Education, 24(4), 285–296.
- Lowrie, T., & Diezmann, C. M. (2011). Solving graphics tasks: Gender differences in middle-school students. Learning and Instruction, 21(1), 109–125.
- Lowrie, T., & Diezmann, C. M. (2009). National numeracy tests: A graphic tells a thousand words. Australian Journal of Education, 53(2), 141–158.

== Other research contributions ==
Lowrie is an Australian Research Council College Member. In 2014 he began a four-year term as President of the Mathematics Education Research Group of Australasia (MERGA). Since 2014 Lowrie has been a member of the International Congress on Mathematical Education (ICME) 2020 Steering Committee. Lowrie was co-editor of the 2012 Mathematics Education Research Group of Australasia (MERGA) 4-yearly review of mathematics education research in Australasia. From 2002 to 2003, Lowrie was co-editor of the journal, Australian Primary Mathematics Classroom. Over the last ten years, he has been a journal referee for a number of national and international periodicals in the field of education and developmental psychology.

== Awards ==
In 2011, Lowrie received the Janet Duffin Award from the British Society for Research into Learning Mathematics. This award is made annually to the author of the paper judged by the Editors, Editorial Board and International Advisory Board, to be the most outstanding contribution to the journal, Research in Mathematics Education. In 2005, he won the CSU Vice-Chancellor's Award for Research Excellence, and also in 2005, was nominated an Expert Assessor of International Standing by the ARC. In 2019, Lowrie and the ELSA team won the University of Canberra Research and Teaching Award for Distinction in Engagement and Impact.
