= Steve Redhead =

UK scholar (1952–2018)

- Born: January 1952
- Died: March 8, 2018 (aged 66)
- Occupations: Academic; media commentator
- Title: Professor of Jurisprudence, Charles Sturt University; Adjunct professor, York University
- Spouse: Tara Brabazon (m. 2002)

Academic background
- Education: University of Manchester (LLM, LLB); University of Warwick (PhD)

Steve Redhead (January 1952 – 8 March 2018) was the Professor of Jurisprudence and Head of Law in the Faculty of Arts at Charles Sturt University. He was also an adjunct professor at York University (Toronto) and was visiting Professor of Accelerated Culture at the University of Bolton.

== Career ==
Redhead held professorships in Canada and the United Kingdom, and a Visiting Professorship at Murdoch University in Australia. While his later scholarship focused on Paul Virilio and theories of accelerated modernity, he was known for his research on post-youth culture, law, critical criminology, and popular culture and football fanzines.

He held an LLB and LLM from Manchester University, and a PhD from the University of Warwick. Combining law and cultural studies, his scholarship focused on theories of deviance in both football fandom and dance cultures, along with current interests in speed, terrorism, football memoirs, war and theories of social change.

Redhead was known for a series of scholarly innovations, in theories of deviance, (post) youth culture and accelerated modernity.

While later working in Bathurst in regional New South Wales, Australia, most of his career was spent at Manchester Metropolitan University where he was Co-Director of the Manchester Institute for Popular Culture with Derek Wynne. He also was the head of the Creative Industries Taskforce for the Geoff Gallop Government in Western Australia. He was married to Tara Brabazon, Professor of Education and Head of the School of Teacher Education at Charles Sturt University.

A media commentator, he appeared on the BBC4 programme, Dance Britannia. He was also a podcaster and developed a series of micro interviews with Tara Brabazon.

Redhead died on 8 March 2018.

== Publications ==
- Sing When You're Winning: Last Football Book (Pluto, 1987)
- Football With Attitude (Wordsmith, 1991)
- Rave Off: Politics and Deviance in Contemporary Youth Culture (Ashgate, 1993; No 1. Popular Cultural Studies)
- Repetitive Beat Generation (Rebel Inc., 2000)
- The Paul Virilio Reader (Edinburgh University Press, 2004)
- Paul Virilio: Theorist for an Accelerated Culture (Edinburgh University Press, 2004)
- The Jean Baudrillard Reader (Edinburgh University Press; Columbia University Press, 2008)
- We have never been postmodern (Edinburgh University Press, 2011)
- Football and Accelerated Culture: This Modern Sporting Life (Routledge, 2015)
- End of the Century Party: Youth, Pop and the Rise of Madchester (Manchester University Press, 2019)
