= Dirk Spennemann =

Australian archaeologist

Dr. Dirk Spennemann, an Australian cultural heritage academic, is an associate professor in Cultural Heritage Management at the School of Agriculture, Environmental, and Veterinary Sciences, Charles Sturt University in Albury, New South Wales, Australia. His main research interest rests in the area of futures studies focussing on heritage futures by examining issues such as the conceptual understanding of emergent heritage(s), the recognition of heritage sites and objects of future heritage value such as Space Heritage and Robotics; and the relationship between cultural heritage values and the influences of management processes as they play out between heritage professionals and the general public.

== Biography ==
Spennemann is the recipient of the Governor's Humanities Award for Excellence in Research and Publication, Commonwealth of the Northern Mariana Islands (2004) and the Partnership Steward Ship Award for Cultural Resources, Pacific West Region, US National Park Service (2001) as well as the Vice Chancellor's Award for Research Excellence, Charles Sturt University (1996) and the Vice Chancellor's Award for Teaching Excellence, Charles Sturt University (1995).

Spennemann is a member of the Association of Professional Futurists, the World Futures Studies Federation, the World Futures Society, the British Interplanetary Society and Australia ICOMOS. Spennemann is the editor of the journals Studies in German Colonial Heritage (ISSN 1834-7797) and Studies in Contemporary and Emergent Heritage (ISSN 1834-4208) and a co-editor of the Micronesian Journal of the Humanities and Social Sciences (ISSN 1449-7336).

== Selected publications ==
- Space Heritage:
  - The ethics of treading on Neil Armstrongs footsteps (2004)
  - The Naval heritage of project Apollo (2005)
  - Heritage sites of the US Space Program in Australia (2005, with Linda Kosmer)
  - Out of this world (2006)
  - Technological heritage on Mars (2007, with Guy Murphy)
  - Extreme Cultural Tourism (in press)
- Heritage Futures & Robotics:
  - Asterix und das Atomkraftwerk. Bibliographic Forensics of a German Underground Comic (2015)
  - On the cultural heritage of robots (2007)
  - Of Great Apes and Robots (2007),
- Space Tourism:
  - Orbital, Lunar and Interplanetary Tourism (in press)
- Conference Papers:
  - Technological heritage on Mars (Paris) (2006, with Guy Murphy)
  - SpaceScapes: Past, Present and Future Extraterrestrial Landscapes in the Human Imagination (Caen, France) (2007)
  - Orbital, Lunar and Interplanetary Tourism: Opportunities for Different Perspectives in Star Tourism (La Palma, Spain) (2007)

Space-related publications (or their abstracts) can be accessed via the SpaceArchaeology Wiki

== See also ==
- Dirk HR Spennemann - official site
