= Tour bus service =

Sightseeing bus service for tourists

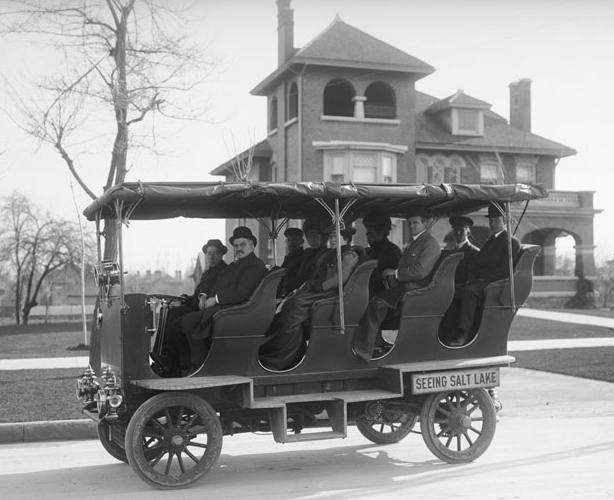
Early tour bus in Salt Lake City, Utah, 1909

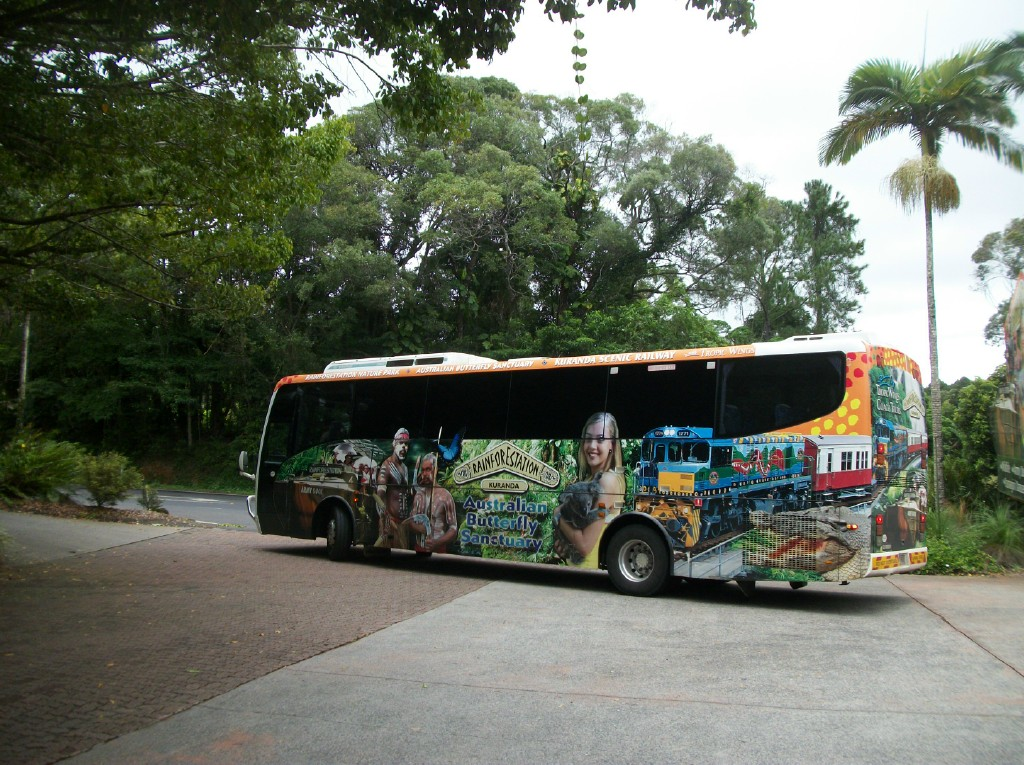
A colourful tour bus at Kuranda, Queensland, Australia

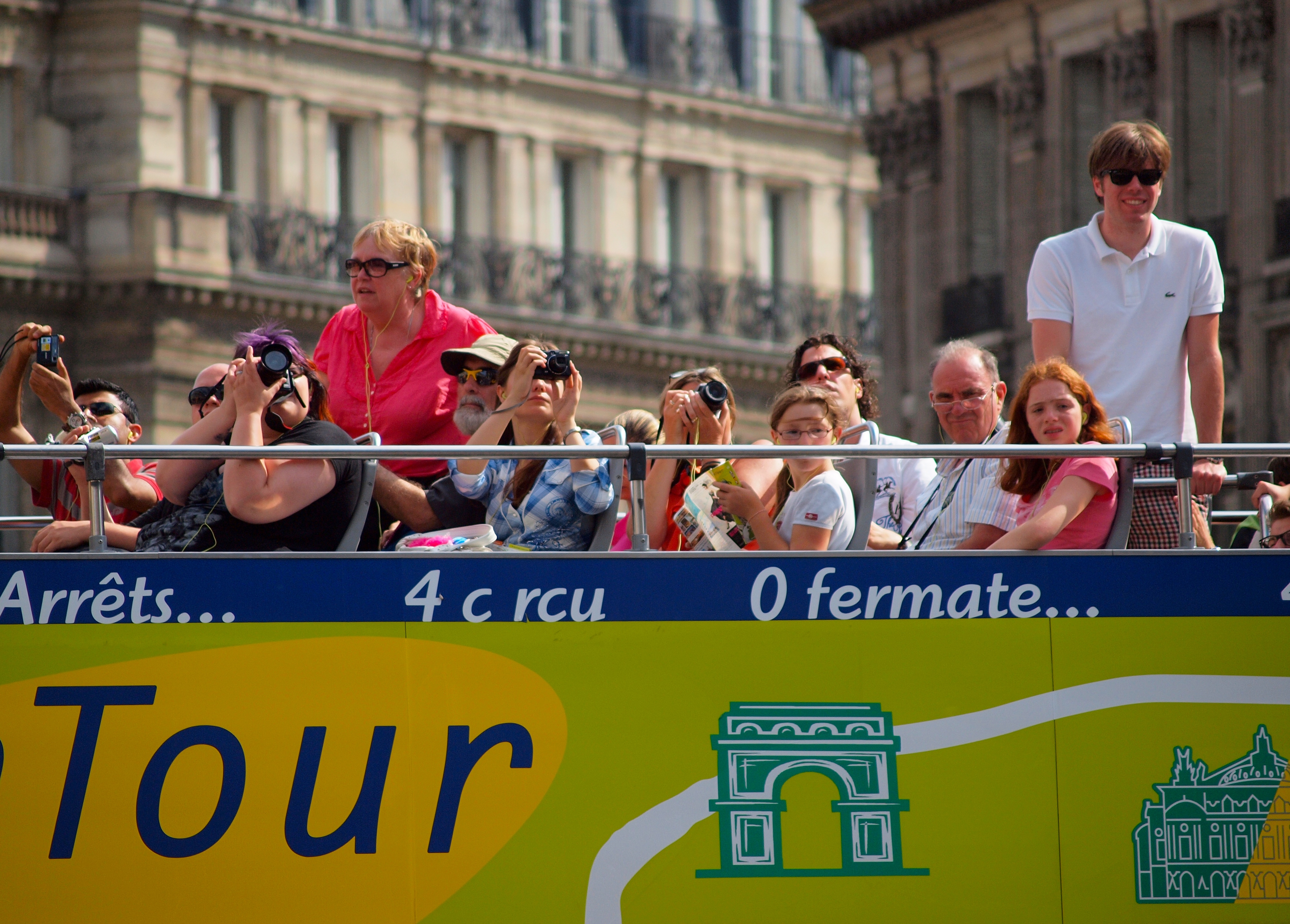
Tourists taking photos from a ParisCityVision open-topped tour bus in Paris.

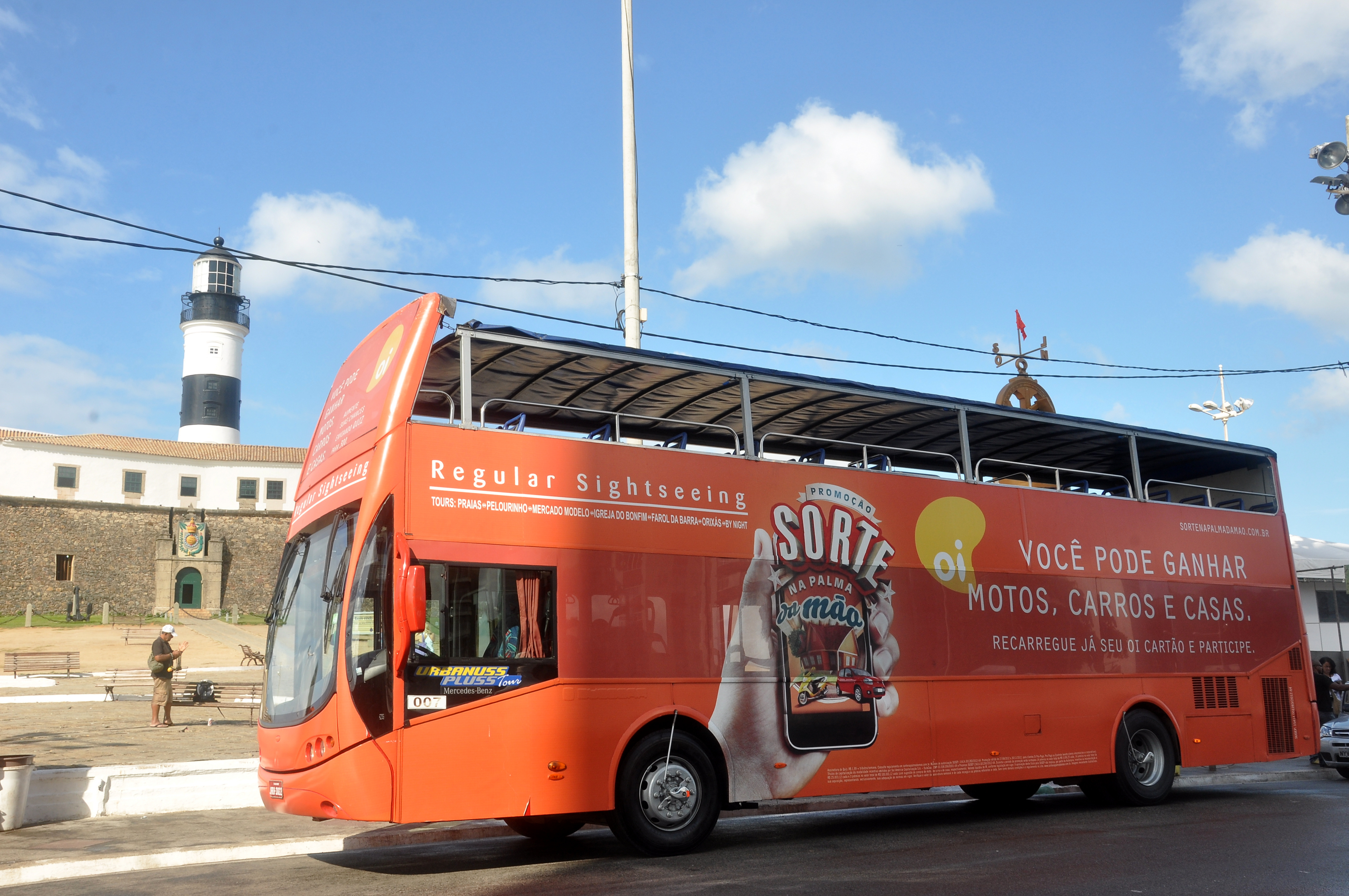
Salvador Bahia Bus in Santo Antonio da Barra Lighthouse, in Salvador, Bahia, Brazil.

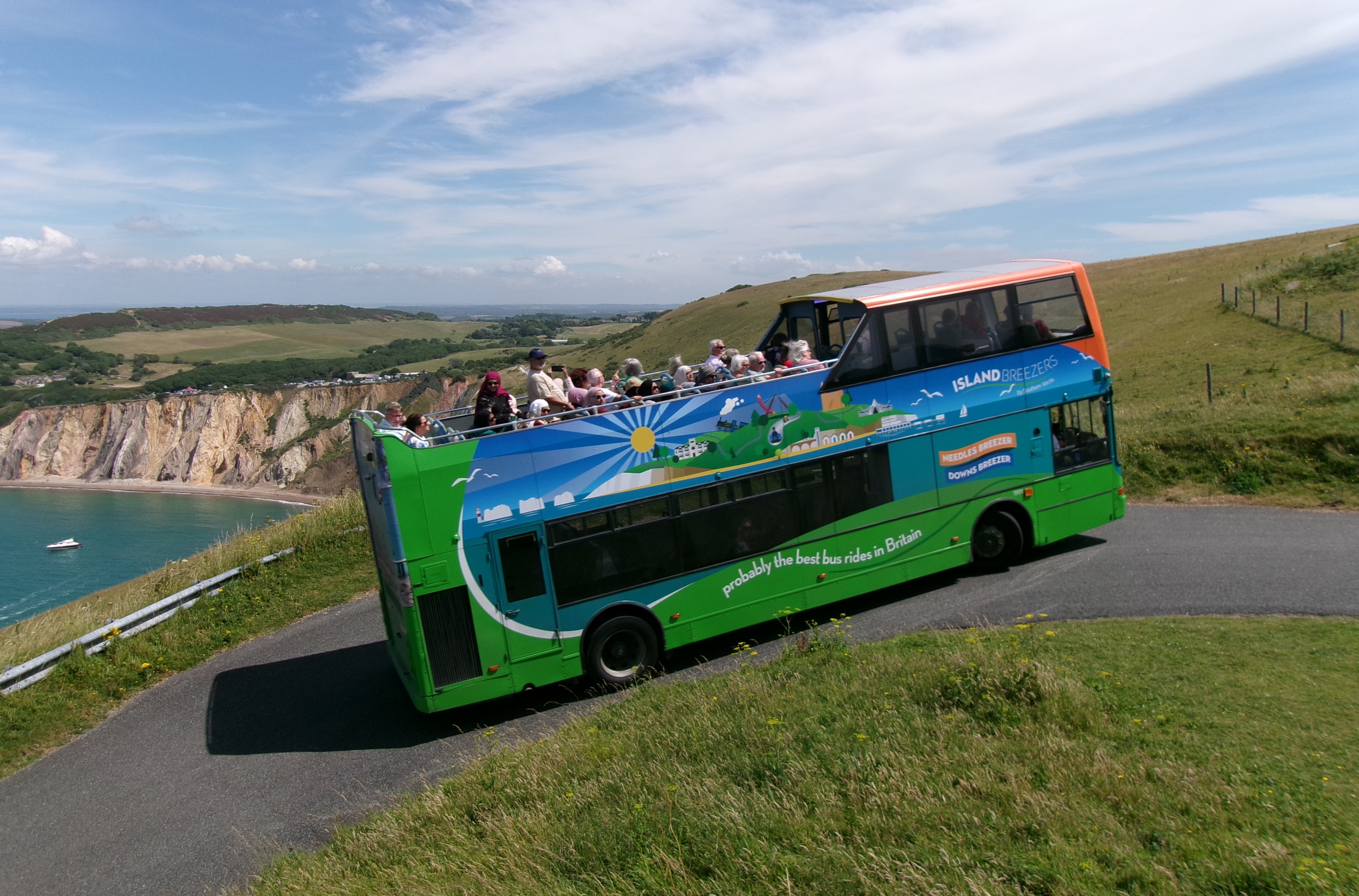
The Needles "Breezer", Isle of Wight, England

A tour bus service is an escorted tour (sometimes a package holiday) or bus service that takes visitors sightseeing, with routes around tourist attractions. A Hop-On Hop-Off service runs to a regular schedule and allows passengers to travel between attractions at their own pace.

== Information ==
Double-decker buses and open top buses are commonly used, for providing a good view. Large coaches are used internationally by tour operators, intercity bus lines and charters, for short and long distance destinations. These buses are larger than regular transit buses, with 2 to 4 axles (6 to 10 wheels).

"Sight-seeing auto" bus tour in the early twentieth century

The history of tour buses in North America began in the early 20th century, when trucks were converted to provide a means for sightseeing within large American cities. Gray Line, the largest sightseeing operators, began operations in 1910. Sightseeing was likely a side business for many intercity bus operators because the same types of buses were used (this remains true even today). World War II saw the industry decline, but it slowly re-emerged as an alternative to driving.

Many musicians, entertainers, dancing crews and bands travel in sleeper buses, commonly referred to as "tour buses". While most if not all of the buses and coaches listed above are for commercial applications, there are many coaches manufactured for personal use as motorhomes. These bus based motorhomes are considered the top end of the RV market.

== Common features ==
- Padded fabric or leather front-facing seats, often reclining.
- Foot and arm rests.
- TV monitors connected to DVD player or VCR to provide entertainment or possibly analog TV or DTV for local news or programs (possibly in seats with viewer choosing what station).
- Basic lavatory – riders may be discouraged from using it except in an emergency, but some newer buses feature full service lavatories
- Cool water dispenser, refrigerator, hot water urn.
- Wheelchair lift or ramp and "kneeling suspension" for easier access (especially for the elderly and infirm).
- Tinted windows (and/or curtains or blinds).
- Luggage compartment (or bins) below in the underbelly of the bus, with overhead hand-luggage racks.

== Tour coach manufacturers ==
- Motor Coach Industries
- Volvo Buses
  - Prevost Car
- Mercedes-Benz buses

== See also ==
- Brendan Sheerin
- Customised buses
- Tourist trolley
- Tour operator
- Intercity bus service
- List of buses
