= Melbourne bus route 901 =

Bus route in Melbourne, Australia

Route 901

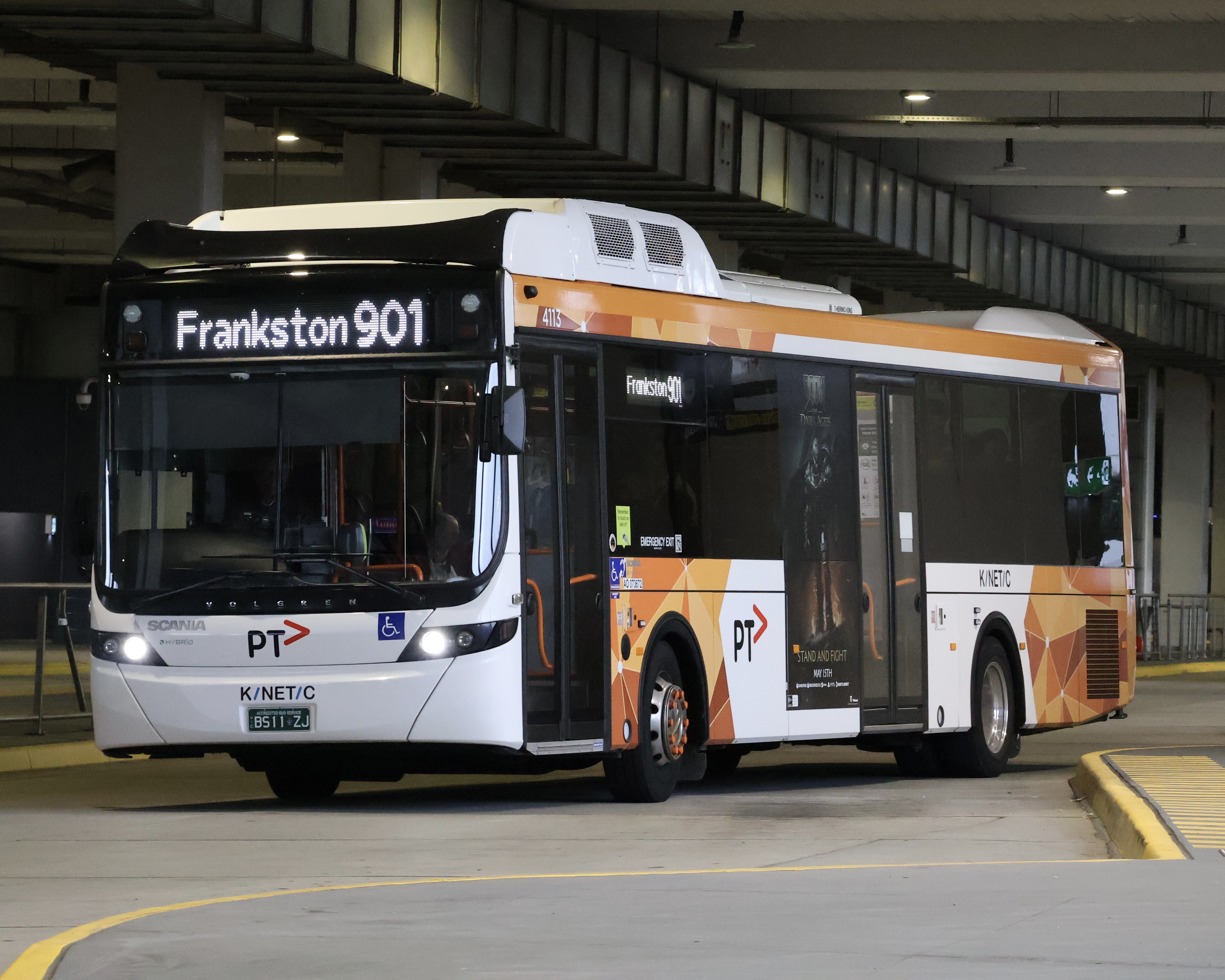
- Kinetic Melbourne Volgren Optimus bodied Scania K320HB at Melbourne Airport in December 2025

Overview
- Operator: Kinetic Melbourne
- Vehicle: Gemilang & Volgren bodied Scanias
- Began service: 24 March 2008
- Former operators: Transdev Melbourne; Ventura Bus Lines; Grenda's Bus Services; Invicta Bus Services; East West Bus Company

Route
- Start: Frankston station
- Via: Dandenong station Westfield Knox; Ringwood station Blackburn station Greensborough station South Morang station Broadmeadows station Gladstone Park
- End: Melbourne Airport
- Length: 115 kilometres

Service
- Level: Daily
- Frequency: 15-30 minutes
- Journey time: 5 hours
- Zone: Myki Zone 2
- Timetable: PTV

Melbourne bus route 901 is a SmartBus route operated by Kinetic Melbourne between Frankston station and Melbourne Airport in Melbourne, Australia.

== History ==
In the late 2000s and early 2010s, orbital bus routes were introduced in Melbourne as an alternative to trains, allowing people to reach major areas without traveling through the city. SmartBus Route 901 was introduced on 24 March 2008 as the yellow orbital, operating from Frankston station to Ringwood station, and absorbing route 665 (operated by Invicta Bus Services) and route 830 (operated by Grenda's Bus Services). The new route was initially jointly operated by Grenda's and Invicta, until Grenda bought Invicta in 2009.

In September 2010, route 901 was extended to Melbourne Airport, replacing part of East West Bus Company route 571. This extension made it Melbourne's second longest bus route by distance and longest by total journey time. East West then also became an operator of the route.

In 2012, the route was operated by East West and Ventura Bus Lines after Ventura acquired Grenda. Transdev Melbourne fully took over the route in 2013, followed by Kinetic Melbourne in January 2022.

== Route ==
Route 901 operates from Frankston station to Melbourne Airport via the outer eastern and northern suburbs of Melbourne. The route travels via Dandenong station, Westfield Knox, Ringwood station, Blackburn station, The Pines Shopping Centre, Greensborough Station, South Morang station, Epping station, Broadmeadows station and Gladstone Park.

== Vehicles ==
Route 901 was initially operated by a dedicated fleet of Volgren bodied Mercedes-Benz OC500LEs painted in SmartBus silver and orange livery. Grenda and East-West later supplemented the Mercedes-Benz fleet with Volvo B7RLEs, and Invicta with Scania K230UBs. These have been superseded by Gemilang and Volgren bodied Scania K320UBs in standard Public Transport Victoria livery. As of 2022, Volgren bodied Scania K320HB hybrid buses are also in service alongside their diesel counterparts.
