= Dysons =

Australian bus and coach operator

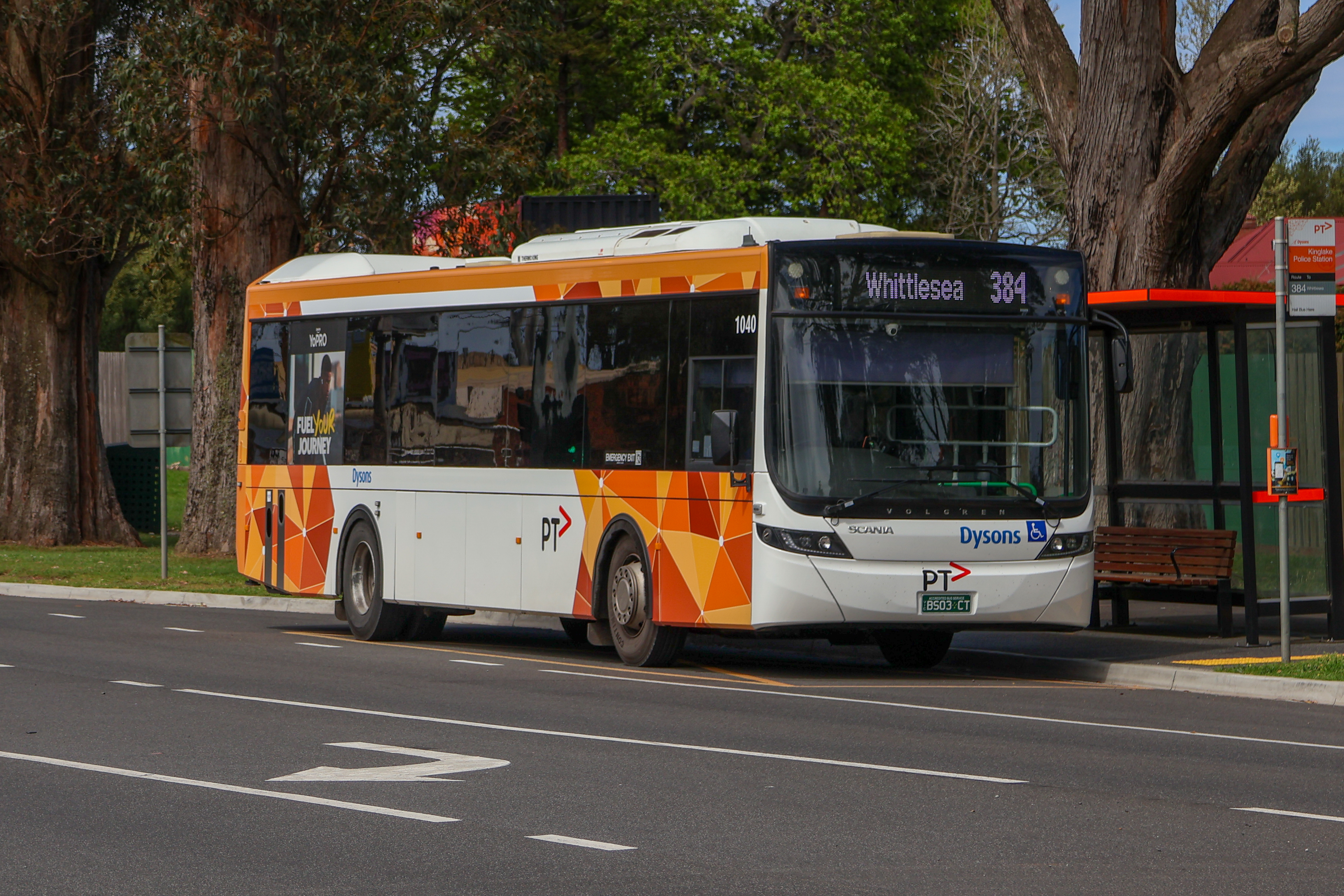
- Volgren bodied Scania K310UB on route 384 in Kinglake, October 2024
- Commenced operation: June 1952
- Ceased operation: 2 October 2026
- Headquarters: Bundoora
- Service area: Melbourne; Regional Victoria; New South Wales; Australian Capital Territory
- Depots: Bairnsdale; Bundoora; Deniliquin; Euroa; Finley; Hay; Kyneton; Mallacoota; Moama; Omeo; Reservoir; Sale; Shepparton; Wandong; Wangaratta; Wodonga
- Fleet: 690 (June 2024)
- Website: www.dysongroup.com.au

Dyson Group of Companies, operating as Dysons, was a bus and coach operator in Victoria, Australia. The oldest of its subsidiary companies is L.C. Dysons Bus Services, which was founded in June 1952 and is based in Bundoora in the northern suburbs of Melbourne.

The company was acquired by bus operator Kinetic on 2 October 2026. The company ceased operations with all of its routes and assets transferred to Kinetic.

== History ==
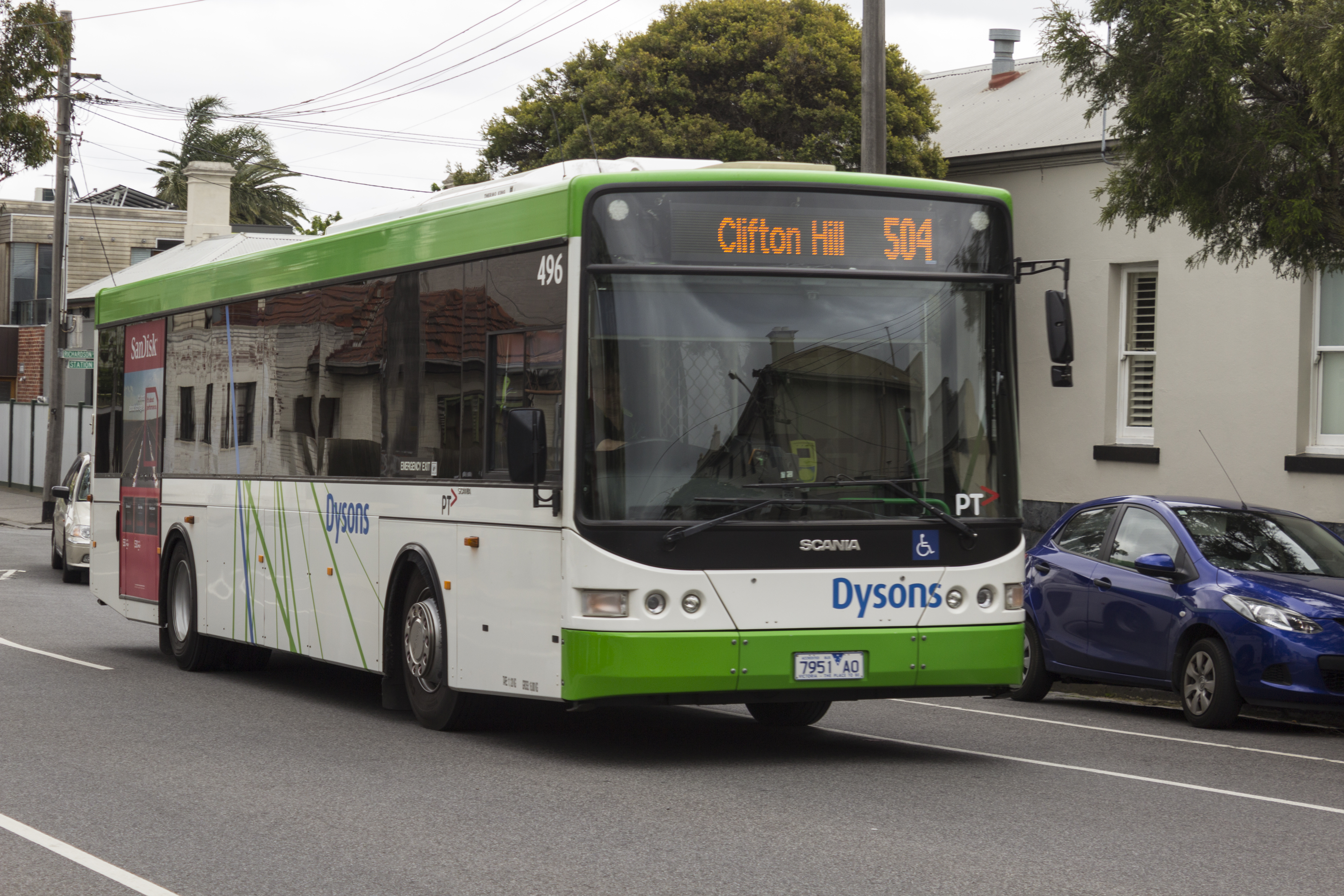
Volgren bodied Scania K230UB in Carlton North, November 2013

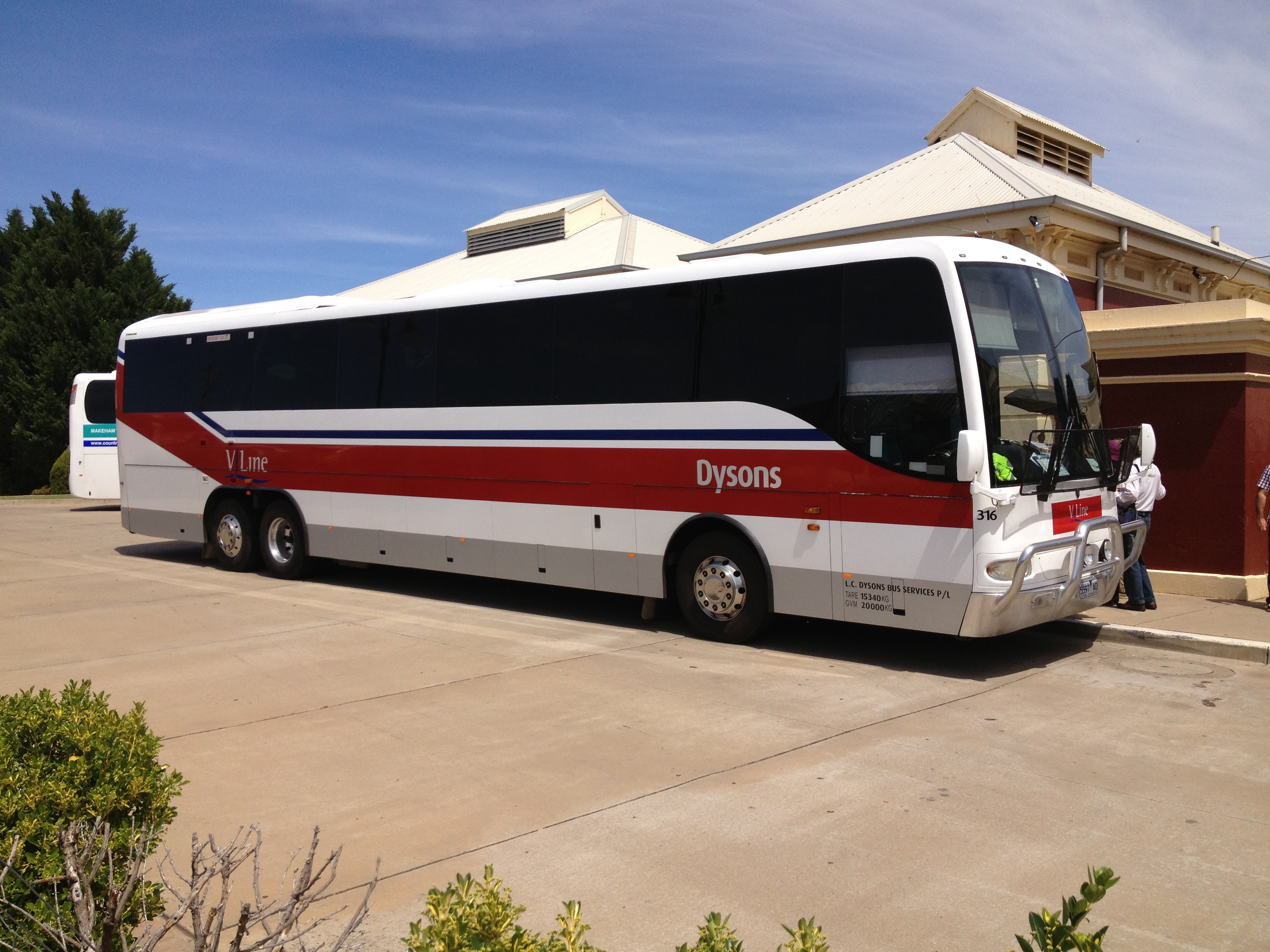
V/Line liveried Coach Design bodied Scania K124EB at Wagga Wagga station, November 2012

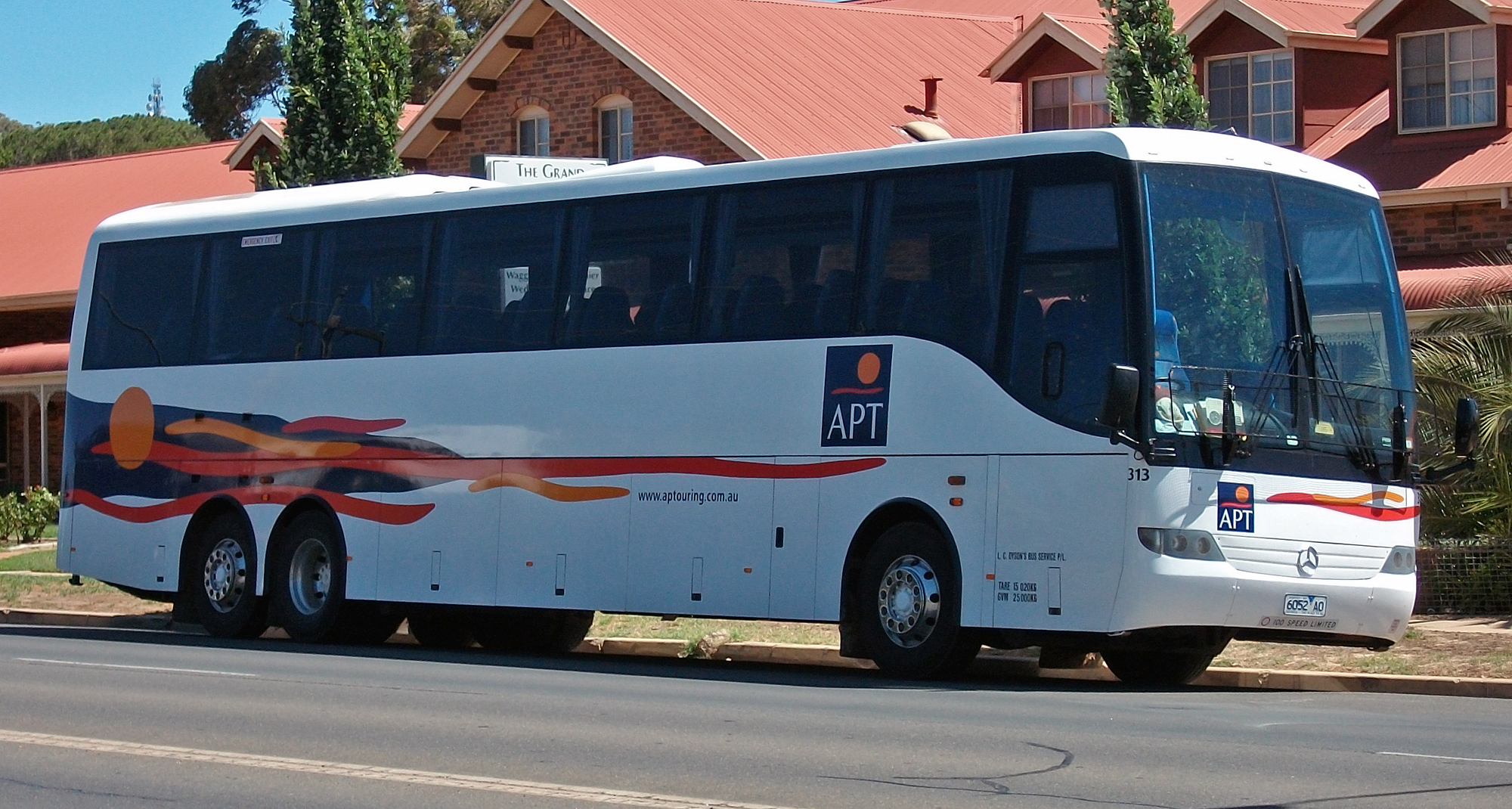
Australian Pacific Touring liveried Coach Design bodied Mercedes Benz O500RF-3 in Wagga Wagga, December 2009

L.C. Dysons Bus Services was founded in June 1952 when Laurie Dyson purchased the business of Ned Gastin, who operated route 46A Regent station to Janefield Hospital. Over succeeding years, a number of routes and businesses were purchased both within Melbourne and in regional Victoria:

- Nathalia to Melbourne service bought from HE Taylor in August 1957
- Kinglake to Melbourne route bought from Heather & Co in 1959
- Acquired a 50% shareholding in Northcote Bus Service in 1966, later increased to 100%. Operated as a separate brand until January 1982
- Bought Lockington to Melbourne route from Harrison, Echuca in 1968
- Bought Anderson's Coaches, Moama which operated the service from Barham and Moama to Melbourne.
- Entered a joint venture with Reservoir Bus Company to form East West Bus Company to operate route 560 Broadmeadows station to Greensborough in August 1980
- Bought Bega to Melbourne route from Gil Toplis in December 1982
- Acquired Deniliquin - Moama - Melbourne route from Ansett Pioneer in 1987
- Bought Bairnsdale - Lakes Entrance route from Lextours, Lakes Entrance, in 1987
- Bought Reid's Metropolitan Services in December 1991
- Acquired Albury - Mildura service from Arms & Bell in July 1992
- Bought Sale - Bairnsdale and Bairnsdale - Orbost route from Florance, Orbost, in January 1994
- Eastern Roadlines, Bairnsdale in January 1994
- Entered a joint venture with Cobb & Co and Sid Fogg's to operate services on behalf of Australian Pacific Tours in 2001
- Bell Street Bus Company including the Cobb & Co coach business in August 2003
- In 2003 Dyson's commenced operating services in Alice Springs, sold in May 2012 to Australian Transit Group
- Bought Kyneton Bus Lines in March 2006
- Acquired Mylon Motorways, Wodonga in July 2008
- Bought Northern Bus Lines, Glenroy, from the Pulitano Group in July 2008
- Reservoir Bus Company and Midland Tours in November 2012
- Full ownership of East West Bus Company in February 2014
- Wangaratta Coachlines in July 2014
- O'Connell's Omeo Bus Service in April 2017
- Shepparton Transit/Fallons Bus Service on 1 June 2017 with nine regional bus routes, one V/Line route and 44 vehicles
- Acquired the Corowa-Albury Rutherglen operation from R & L Webster in September 2017
- Bought Bunnaloo Bus Lines in Bunnaloo in January 2018
- Bought McDonald's Euroa in January 2018
- Acquired Wandong Bus & Coach in March 2018
- Bought Purtills, Deniliquin in December 2019, with 55 vehicles
- Bought Little's Gippsland Coaches in October 2021, with 28 vehicles
- Acquired Moonee Valley Coaches route services in March 2024, with 11 vehicles

Further to the above acquisitions, Dysons also gained additional bus routes as a result of bus contracting:

- In partnership with Reservoir Bus Company, Dysons formed Melbourne Bus Link in April 1998, after being awarded a contract to take over provision of services in the western and south-east regions of Melbourne from Met Bus. The operation ceased in August 2013.
- PTV route services of Panorama Coaches (routes 343, 578, 579, 580 and 582) in July 2025

== Services ==
Since the late 1970s, as well as running route services in Melbourne, Dyson have operated services under contract to V/Line. In February 1989, all of Dyson's existing long coach services were integrated into the V/Line network. Dyson operate V/Line services as far afield as Batemans Bay, Canberra, Griffith and Adelaide.

From 2002 until December 2007, Dyson operated a service in New South Wales between Parkes and Condobolin under contract to CountryLink. In January 2015, Dyson commenced operating five-year contracts to operate services for NSW TrainLink from Wagga Wagga to Griffith, Cootamundra to Tumbarumba, Cootamundra to Bathurst/Dubbo and Parkes to Condobolin.

In September 2024, the Victorian Government announced that Dysons had been awarded a new ten-year bus contract to operate buses in northern Melbourne. As part of the new contract, it would retain roughly half of its existing routes (mostly north of the M80 Ring Road and east of Sydney Road), and would also gain five bus routes operated by Panorama Coaches. However, it would lose the other half of its existing routes. All but one (route 504) of its former Northern Bus Lines routes were lost to CDC Melbourne. Route 504, the two former Moonee Valley routes it acquired in February 2024 (routes 503 and 506), and nine other inner-north Melbourne routes were lost to Kinetic Melbourne. The new contracts and changes in bus operators commenced on 1 July 2025.

== Fleet ==
As of June 2024, Dysons fleet consisted of 690 buses and coaches. Dysons official fleet livery is white with green stripes however newer buses which operate route services in Melbourne are painted in the Public Transport Victoria livery. Some coaches are painted in V/Line livery and NSW TrainLink livery.

== Cessation ==
In May 2026, it was announced that, after operating for 73 years, Dysons was to be bought by Kinetic. At the time, Kinetic Melbourne operated just south of Dysons' Melbourne operating area. The acquisition was finalised on 2 October 2026, with all Dysons routes, depots and assets transferred to Kinetic. The rebranding to Kinetic also began immediately that day and the Dysons brand ceased to exist.
