= East West Bus Company =

Bus operator in Melbourne, Australia

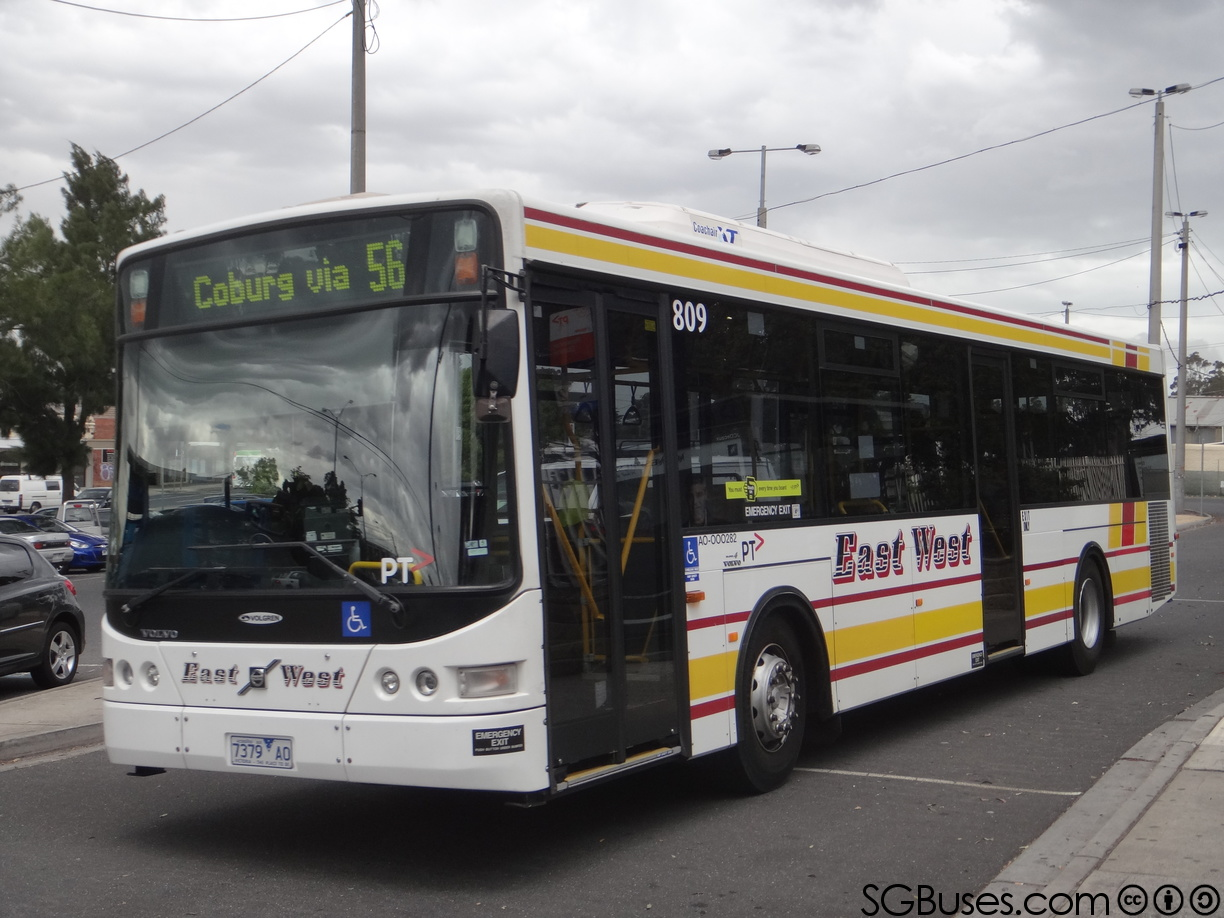
- East West Bus Company Volgren bodied Volvo B7RLE
- Parent: Dysons
- Founded: August 1980
- Ceased operation: c. 2019
- Headquarters: Reservoir
- Service area: Northern Melbourne
- Service type: Bus operator
- Routes: 3
- Hubs: La Trobe University; RMIT University, Bundoora
- Stations: Macleod; Pascoe Vale; Reservoir; Thomastown
- Fleet: 25 (October 2012)
- Website: www.reservoirbus.com.au/uewbc

East West Bus Company was a bus operator in Melbourne, Australia. Formed as a joint venture between Dysons and Reservoir Bus Company in 1980, it became fully owned by Dysons in February 2014. It operated three bus routes under contract to Public Transport Victoria until the brand was phased out in 2019.

== History ==
East West Bus Company was formed in August 1980 as a joint venture between Dysons and Reservoir Bus Company. At the time, Dysons operated in areas east of where Reservoir Bus Company operated, and East West Bus Company routes generally ran in an east-west direction servicing both operating areas. The first route that commenced was route 560 between Broadmeadows station and Greensborough. This was followed by route 561 Reservoir to Macleod station in March 1981 and route 570 Thomastown to Phillip Institute of Technology's Bundoora campus in 1984.

Route 571 was a regular bus route introduced in 1997 between Morang South Primary School and Hume Highway in Campbellfield via Epping. It was upgraded in December 2003 to provide additional Trainlink shuttle services between Plenty Valley Town Centre and Epping station, as an interim measure by the state government while the South Morang extension of the Epping line remained unbuilt. The Trainlink services were timetabled to connect to or from trains at Epping station. The route was extended westwards to Roxburgh Park station in October 2007 with the opening of the Craigieburn line extension.

By 2010, the company operated four routes. Route 560 ceased in April 2010 and was replaced by SmartBus route 902. Route 571 was truncated from Roxburgh Park back to Epping, and the truncated section was replaced by an extension of SmartBus route 901 to Melbourne Airport in September 2010. As a result, East West Bus Company became operators of both SmartBus routes, jointly operated with Grenda's Bus Services (and later Ventura Bus Lines).

Route 571 was discontinued with the opening of the South Morang rail extension in April 2012. The two SmartBus routes 901 and 902 were taken over by Transdev Melbourne in August 2013. This left East West Bus Company with two bus routes 561 and 570.

Dysons bought out Reservoir Bus Company from the Cooper family in November 2012, however East West Bus Company remained jointly owned by the Cooper family and Dysons until the latter took full ownership in February 2014. In February 2016, East West Bus Company began operating a new La Trobe University shuttle route 301.

By March 2019, all three routes (301, 561 and 570) were shown on the Public Transport Victoria website as being operated by Dysons, and the East West branding phased out.

== Fleet ==
As of October 2012, East West Bus Company operated a fleet of 17 SmartBus-liveried buses and eight East West-liveried buses. Since being fully acquired by Dysons in 2014, East West had 10 new Volgren bodied Scania K310UB buses with the East West name, with some in the East West livery and others in the orange Public Transport Victoria livery.

All 17 SmartBus-liveried buses were transferred to Transdev Melbourne in August 2013. The remaining East West-liveried buses were rebranded as Dysons in 2019, with those in East West livery repainted to Dysons livery.

== See also ==
- Melbourne Bus Link – another joint venture between Dysons and Reservoir Bus Company
