= Clipper Tours =

- Parent: Jim Hawkesford
- Ceased operation: September 2011
- Headquarters: Waterloo
- Service type: Coach charter services
- Website: www.hawkesfordscoaches.com.au

Clipper Tours was an Australian coach operator in Sydney. Founded by Thomas O’Brien in 1945–46

== History ==
Clipper Tours was formed by Thomas O’Brien in 1945-46 the first vehicle was a stretched passenger vehicle professionally converted by W.S Grice Summer hill bodybuilders. operating out of Sydney and Bowral NSW sold to Ray Cotrill in Campsie. In the late 50s the business was sold to Ron Deane who operated Deanes Coaches on Sydney's North Shore.

In October 1985 the business was sold to Australian Rambler Coaches, Melbourne proprietor Don Nugent and Jim Hawkesford. In March 1994, it was sold to Ross Adair. In the late 1980s, a depot was established in Canberra with an express service from Sydney to Canberra commencing in March 1989. This ceased in October 1990 with the Canberra depot closed.

In January 1997 the business was purchased by Driver Group. Driver's primary interest in Clipper Tours was the Gray Line franchise that it held. Having separated this from the business, Clipper Tours was sold back to the Deane family in February 1998. The Deane's by now had sold their North Shore operation and were operating South Trans. By this stage the operation had relocated from Macquarie Park to Waterloo.

In 2002, Clipper Tours was placed in administration. The trading name was purchased by former owner Jim Hawkesford with some of his Hawkesfords Coaches fleet having Clipper signwriting applied. In September 2011, Hawkesfords was placed in administration and liquidated.

== Fleet ==
When Ron Deane purchased the business in 1964, it consisted of three Bedfords. By 1969, the fleet had grown to 13 coaches. In November 1970, the first of many Denning coaches was purchased. It later purchased Mercedes-Benz O302s and Domino products, no doubt helped by Dennis Deane being a Domino sales representative. It then purchased MAN, Mercedes-Benz O303 and Scania coaches. Under Deane's ownership Clipper Tours livery was a variation of the yellow with white and blue Deanes Coaches livery. Following its sale in October 1985, the white with maroon and blue of Australian Rambler Coaches was adopted. When sold back to Deane's a variation of the South Trans livery was introduced.
