= Australia Wide Coaches =

Australian coach company

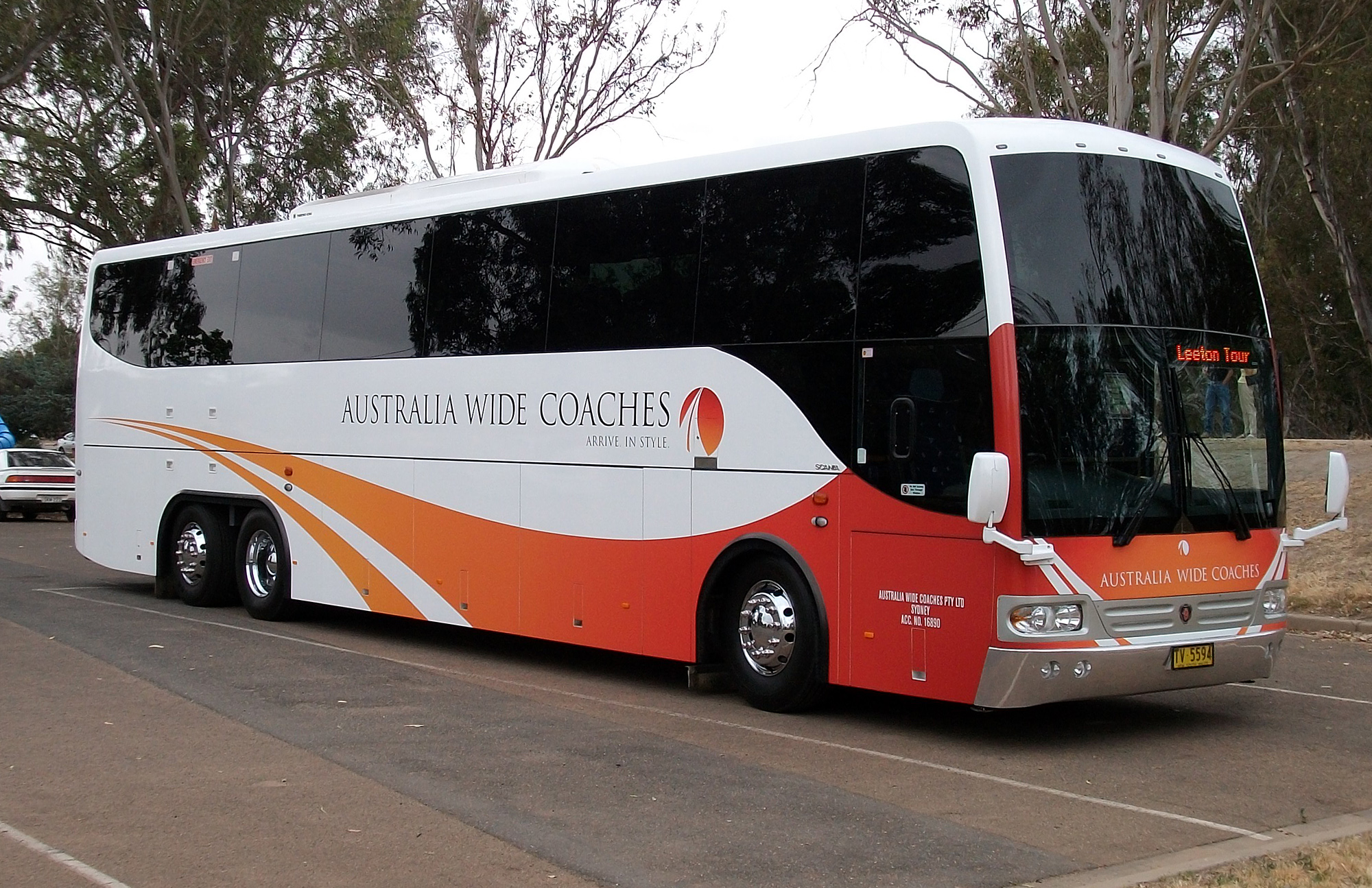
- Coach Design bodied Scania K480EB in Wagga Wagga in November 2009
- Parent: Richard Dawes
- Commenced operation: 1993; 33 years ago
- Headquarters: Alexandria
- Service area: Sydney & Central West
- Service type: Coach services
- Depots: 2
- Fleet: 16 (February 2015)
- Website: www.austwidecoaches.com.au

Australia Wide Coaches is an Australian coach company operating charter services, an express service between Orange and Sydney and services in Central West New South Wales under contract to NSW TrainLink.

== History ==
Australia Wide Coaches was founded by Richard Dawes and Phil Langley in 1993 in Dubbo.

In October 2009, the coach operations of Selwoods Coaches, Orange were purchased. Selwoods had been operating a service from Orange to Sydney since April 1989. Since June 1990, Selwoods had been operating services under contract to CountryLink from Lithgow to Orange, Grenfell and Parkes. Both of these remain in operation today.

In November 2013, Australia Wide Coaches commenced operating Gray Line services in Sydney under licence to the Driver Group.

On 2 September 2014, a service commenced operating between Orange and Canberra. This has since ceased.

In February 2016, the office and depot relocated from Mascot to Alexandria.

As of 1 August 2024, Australia Wide Coaches returned to Langley family ownership when Langley's Coaches purchased the Australia Wide Coaches operation with the full fleet of coaches.

== Fleet ==
As at February 2015, the fleet consisted of 16 coaches. It commenced operations with an Austral Tourmaster before gradually expanding with Scania coaches.
