= Melbourne Visitor Shuttle =

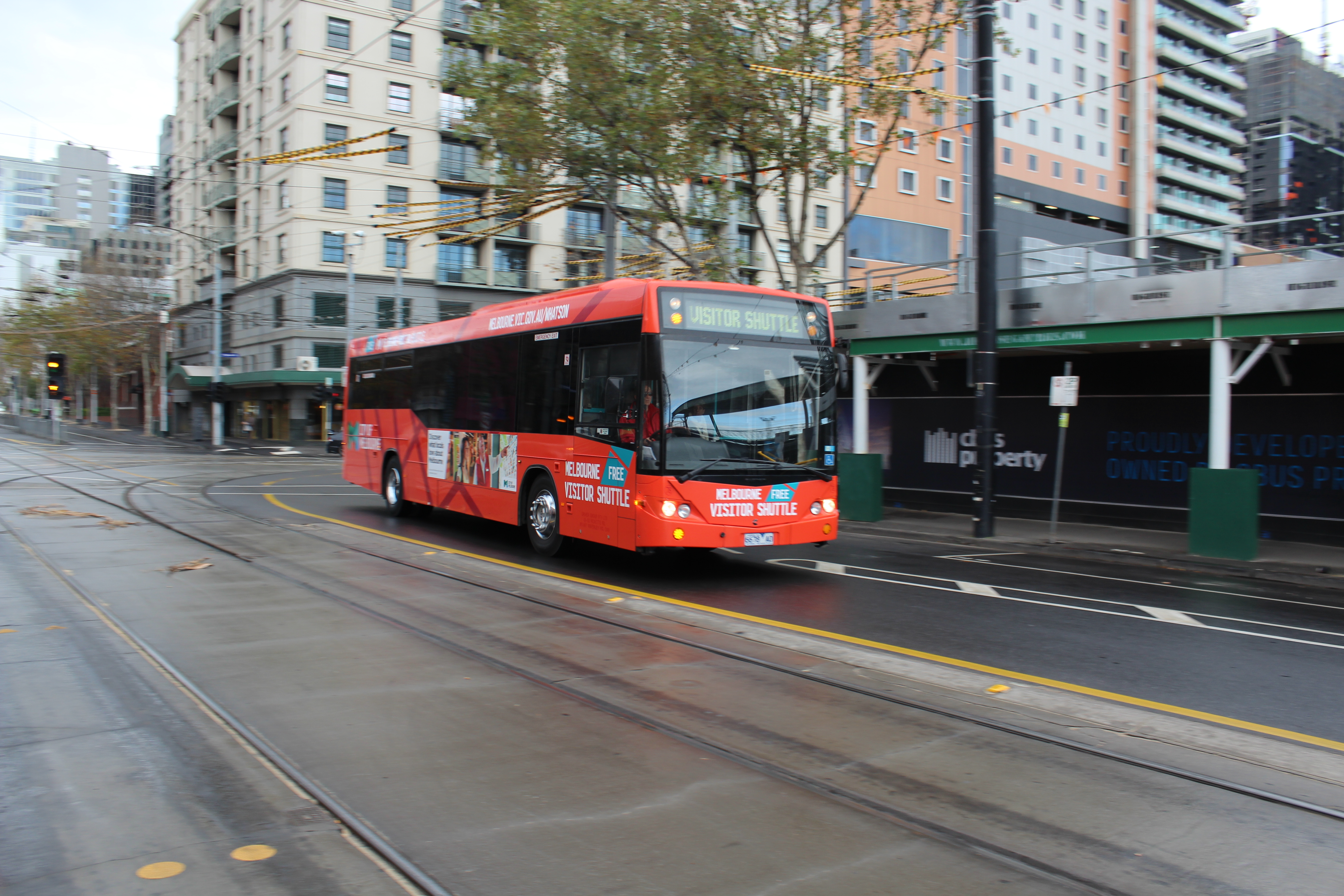
- Driver Bus Lines Custom Coaches bodied Denning Manufacturing on La Trobe Street in June 2013

Overview
- Operator: Driver Bus Lines
- Began service: 1 March 2006
- Ended service: 31 August 2017

Route
- Start: Arts Precinct
- Via: Federation Square; Sports Precinct; Chinatown; Melbourne Museum; Lygon Street; University of Melbourne; Queen Victoria Market; Waterfront City Docklands; Docklands Stadium; William Street; Southbank; Shrine of Remembrance
- End: Arts Precinct

Service
- Level: Daily
- Frequency: 30 minutes
- Journey time: 90 minutes
- Operates: 09:30–15:45

The Melbourne Visitor Shuttle (formerly the Melbourne City Tourist Shuttle) was a tourist-oriented bus service that operated in the city of Melbourne, Australia from March 2006 until August 2017. It was operated by Driver Bus Lines on behalf of the City of Melbourne, who received funding through the state government road congestion levy.

The bus route encircled the heart of Melbourne City Centre and Carlton in an anti-clockwise direction and had 13 stops near key tourist destinations. The service ran daily at 30-minute intervals between 09:30 and 15:45 (except certain public holidays) and provided a running commentary on the city's attractions. A similar service, on a different route, was also provided by the City Circle Tram.

== Stops, attractions and destinations ==
- Stop 1: Arts Precinct – National Gallery of Victoria, Australian Centre for Contemporary Art, Malthouse Theatre, State Theatre and Hamer Hall
- Stop 2: Federation Square – Melbourne Visitor Centre, Australian Centre for the Moving Image and Birrarung Marr
- Stop 3: Sports Precinct (except on MCG event days), Rod Laver Arena, Melbourne Park, Olympic Park, Melbourne Cricket Ground & Fitzroy Gardens
- Stop 4: Chinatown, Theatres District, Her Majesty's Theatre, Princess Theatre & Comedy Theatre
- Stop 5: Melbourne Museum, Carlton Gardens, Royal Exhibition Building & Old Melbourne Gaol
- Stop 6: Lygon Street Precinct
- Stop 7: University of Melbourne
- Stop 8: Queen Victoria Market & Flagstaff Gardens
- Stop 9: Waterfront City Docklands including Harbour Town
- Stop 10: Docklands Stadium & Victoria Harbour
- Stop 11: William Street, Immigration Museum & Melbourne Aquarium
- Stop 12: Southbank & Yarra River, Southgate, Eureka Skydeck, Crown Melbourne, Melbourne Convention & Exhibition Centre & Melbourne Maritime Museum
- Stop 13: Shrine of Remembrance and Royal Botanic Gardens, Kings Domain, Sidney Myer Music Bowl, Government House & La Trobe's Cottage

== History ==
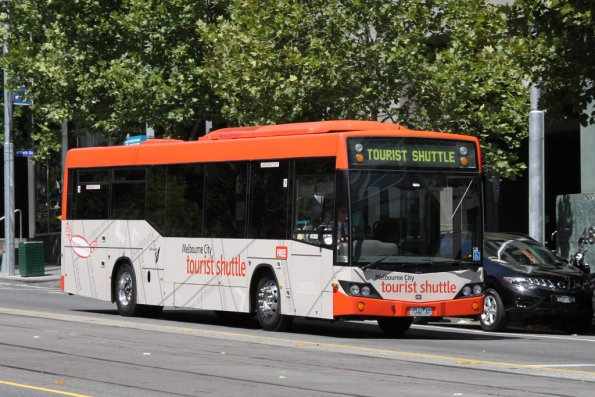
Driver Bus Lines Custom Coaches bodied Denning Manufacturing in January 2010

The idea for a north-south loop service arose in the late 1990s when the City of Melbourne proposed a tram service that would complement the City Circle Tram service which operates on an east-west loop. By 2000, the idea had evolved to a free shuttle bus service, and a fully detailed proposal was presented in November 2005 to the council's Planning and Development Committee. The service commenced operation in March 2006 to coincide with the staging of the 2006 Commonwealth Games under contract by Ventura Bus Lines.

The concept and funding of the shuttle service received some criticism. In a submission to the Melbourne Transport Strategy from the Bus Association Victoria in September 2005, prior to the establishment of the service, concerns raised included the duplication of existing bus and tram services, the encouragement of commuters to park just outside the levy zone, the failure of previous tourist bus services, and the additional complications to the bus network. In June 2007, City of Melbourne Lord Mayor, John So, responded to criticism of the council using money generated by the car parking levy to fund the service commenting: "The tourist shuttle bus is funded through the parking levy because the levy is used to fund sustainable transport-related initiatives".

In mid-2007, the contract for operation of the service was re-tendered. Driver Bus Lines was awarded the contract, Driver Bus Lines commenced operating the service with a somewhat-modified route on 1 September 2007, using three buses borrowed from Buslines Group and one demonstrator from Volvo until new units could be delivered. The new units, Custom Coaches bodied Denning Manufacturing chassis, entered service on 20 October. Driver was awarded a further five-year contract in 2012.

Initially, the bus service was free, and the City of Melbourne covered the estimated $1.8 million a year cost. In 2011, councillors decided to charge users, with a $10 ticket being introduced. Passenger numbers dropped significantly from 330,000 in 2014 to 43,000 in 2016. Melbourne Lord Mayor, Robert Doyle, suggested that the introduction of the Free Tram Zone (free tram travel within the Melbourne CBD) in 2015 was one of the factors in the decline in patronage. In May 2017, City of Melbourne councillors voted to withdraw funding for the service, and it was discontinued on 31 August 2017.
