= Reservoir Bus Company =

Australian bus company (1968–2017)

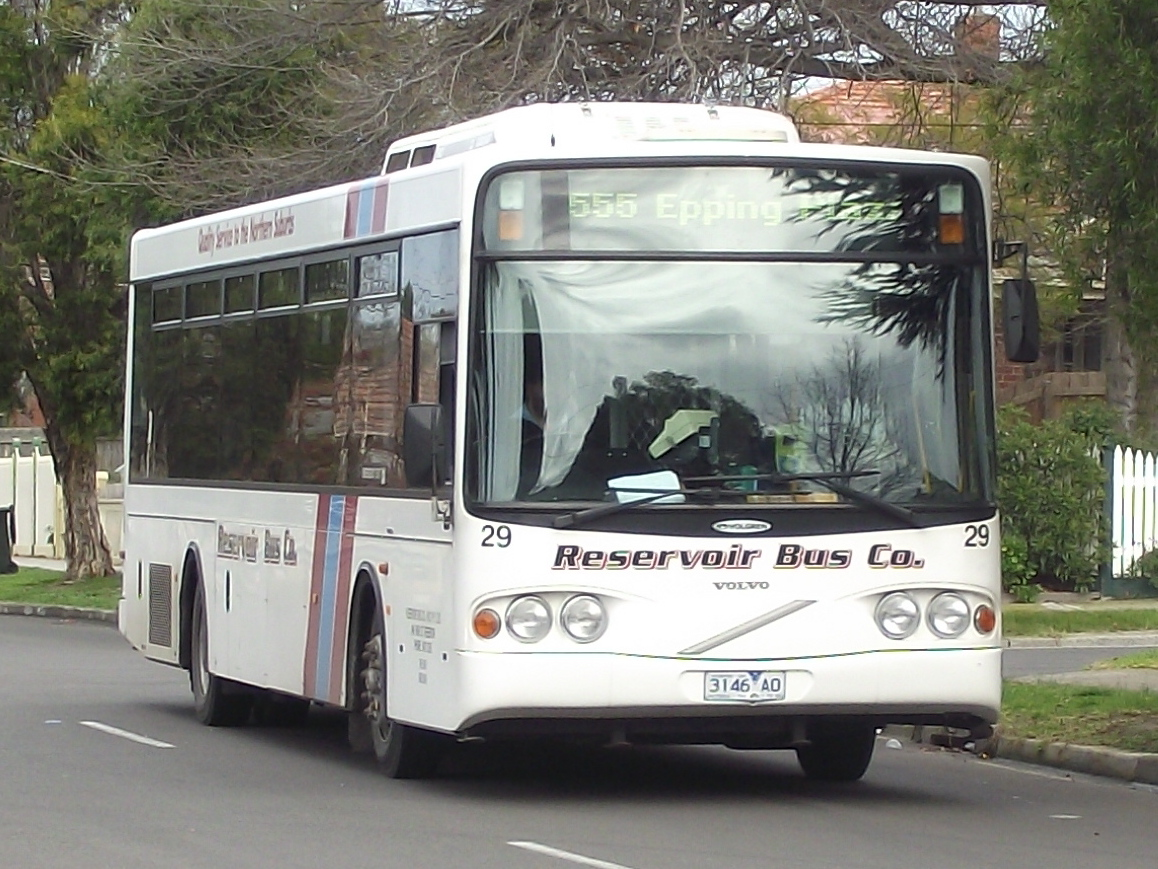
- Volgren bodied Volvo B10BLE on Oakhill Avenue, Preston
- Parent: Dysons
- Founded: December 1968
- Ceased operation: 2017
- Headquarters: Reservoir
- Service area: Melbourne
- Service type: Bus and coach operator
- Routes: 10
- Stations: Epping; Preston; Reservoir; South Morang; Thomastown
- Fleet: 56 (May 2013)
- Website: www.reservoirbus.com.au

Reservoir Bus Company was a privately owned bus and coach operator in Melbourne, Australia. As a Melbourne bus company, it operated 10 bus routes under contract to the Government of Victoria. The company was bought by Dysons Group in November 2012, and its branding was gradually replaced by Dysons branding until 2017.

== History ==
In 1954, Pat Cooper owned 51% of the newly-formed East Preston-Epping Bus Service, in partnership with the existing operators of Reservoir Motors. Separate to the partnership, in 1957, Cooper purchased two buses and two charter licences, and registered the Midland Tours charter company. By 1964, other different small operators have joined the East Preston-Epping Bus Service partnership. Management of the partnership also passed from Pat to his son John Cooper. The East Preston-Epping Bus Service partnership evolved into the Reservoir Bus Company, which was formed in December 1968. The Cooper family continued to manage both Reservoir Bus Company and Midland Tours.

In August 1980, Reservoir Bus Company formed a joint venture with Dysons, the East West Bus Company, to operate routes that serviced both Reservoir and Dysons operating areas, such as route 560 between Broadmeadows station and Greensborough. In April 1998, Reservoir formed another joint venture with Dysons, the Melbourne Bus Link, to operate services previously operated by Met Bus in the western and south-east regions of Melbourne.

In November 2012, the Dyson Group purchased Reservoir Bus Company, including the Midland Tours brand. The Melbourne Bus Link ceased in August 2013 when Transdev Melbourne took over the former Met Bus routes. The Cooper family sold its 50% share of East West Bus Company to Dysons in February 2014.

Between 2012 and 2017, both the Reservoir Bus Company and Midland Tours brands were gradually replaced by the Dysons and its Cobb & Co brands respectively. Its website closed in 2017 and redirected to the Dysons website until 2019.

== Fleet ==
As at May 2013 the fleet consists of 56 buses and coaches. Fleet livery is white with maroon and blue stripes.

== See also ==
- Buses in Melbourne
- List of Victorian Bus Companies
- List of Melbourne bus routes
