= Melbourne Bus Link =

Bus operator in Melbourne

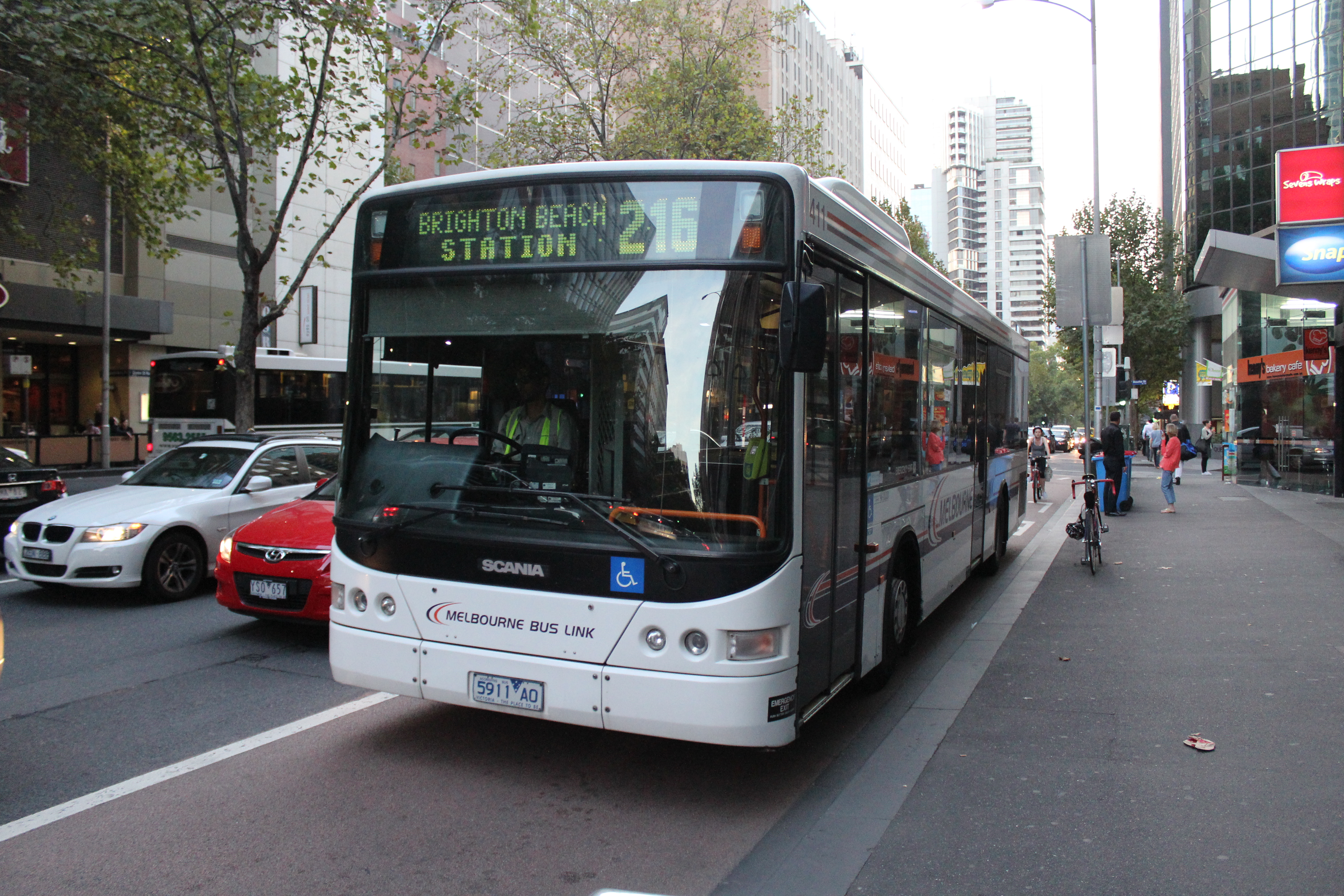
- Volgren bodied Scania L94UB in Queen Street in April 2013
- Parent: 50/50 joint venture between Dysons and former proprietors of Reservoir Bus Company
- Commenced operation: April 1998
- Ceased operation: 3 August 2013
- Service area: West and South-Eastern; Melbourne
- Service type: Bus operator
- Routes: 9
- Hubs: Highpoint Shopping Centre
- Stations: Brighton Beach; Cheltenham; Footscray; Sandringham; Sunshine
- Depots: Footscray; Sandringham
- Fleet: 86 (August 2013)
- Website: www.melbbuslink.com.au

Melbourne Bus Link was an Australian bus and coach operator in Melbourne. It was a Melbourne bus company that operated nine bus routes under contract to the Public Transport Victoria. Melbourne Bus Link ceased operations on 3 August 2013.

== History ==
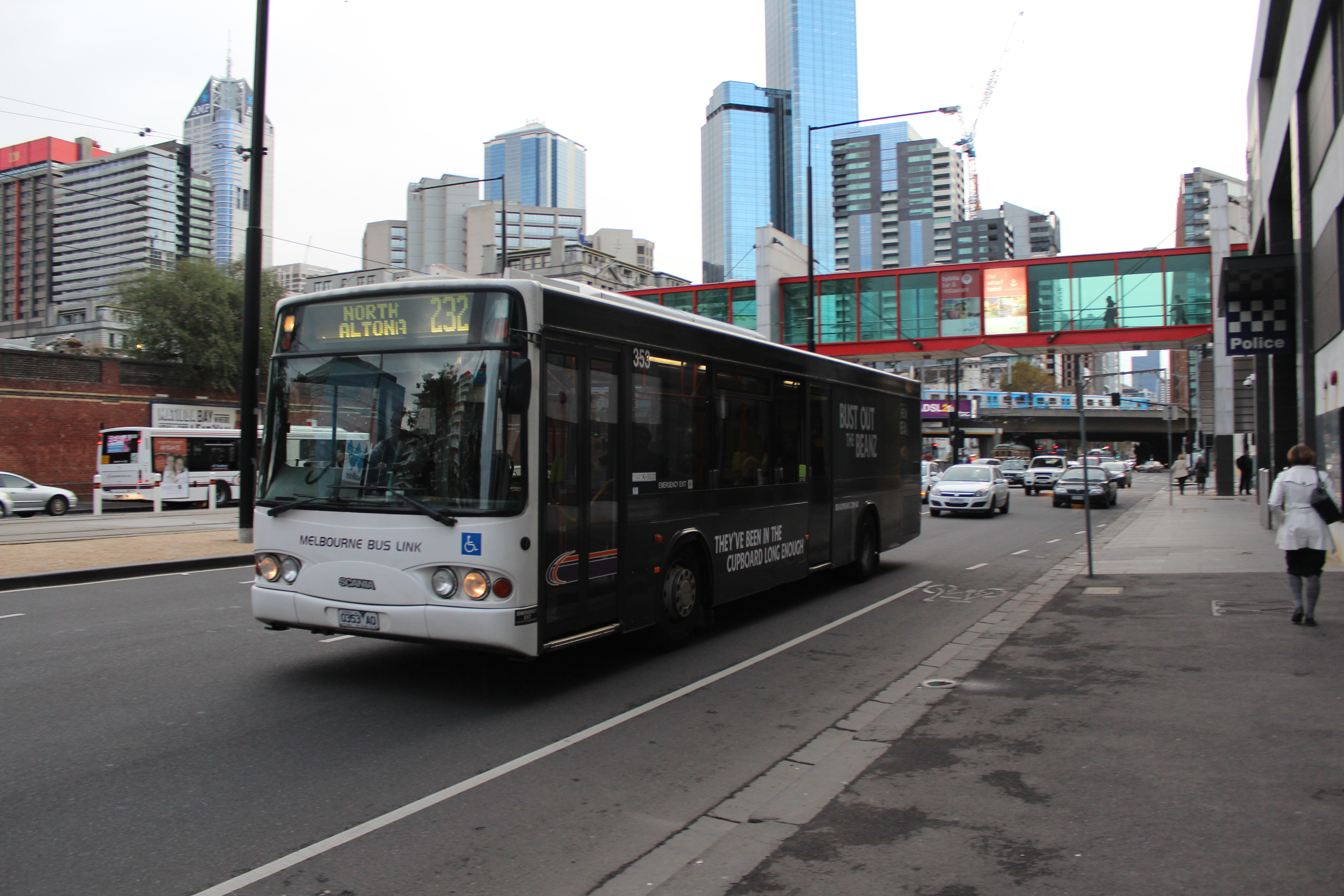
Volgren bodied Scania L94UB in Flinders Street in May 2013

In April 1998 a consortium owned by Dysons and Reservoir Bus Company (Cooper family) commenced operating a contract to operate the remaining bus services of Met Bus in the western and south-east regions of Melbourne. Included were depots at Footscray and Sandringham and 86 MAN SL200 buses.

While Dysons bought out Reservoir Bus Company (owned by Cooper family) in November 2012, Melbourne Bus Link remained jointly owned by the Cooper family and Dysons.

In April 2013, Transdev Melbourne were announced as the preferred tenderer to operate the Melbourne Metropolitan Bus Franchise, which included the services operated by Melbourne Bus Link. Melbourne Bus Link ceased operations on 3 August 2013.

== Fleet ==
When operations ceased in August 2013, Melbourne Bus Link operated 86 buses, primarily Volgren bodied Scanias. The fleet livery was white with purple and orange stripes.

== See also ==
- East West Bus Company – another joint venture between Dysons and Reservoir Bus Company
- Buses in Melbourne
- List of Victorian Bus Companies
- List of Melbourne bus routes
