= Panorama Coaches =

Bus and coach operator in Australia

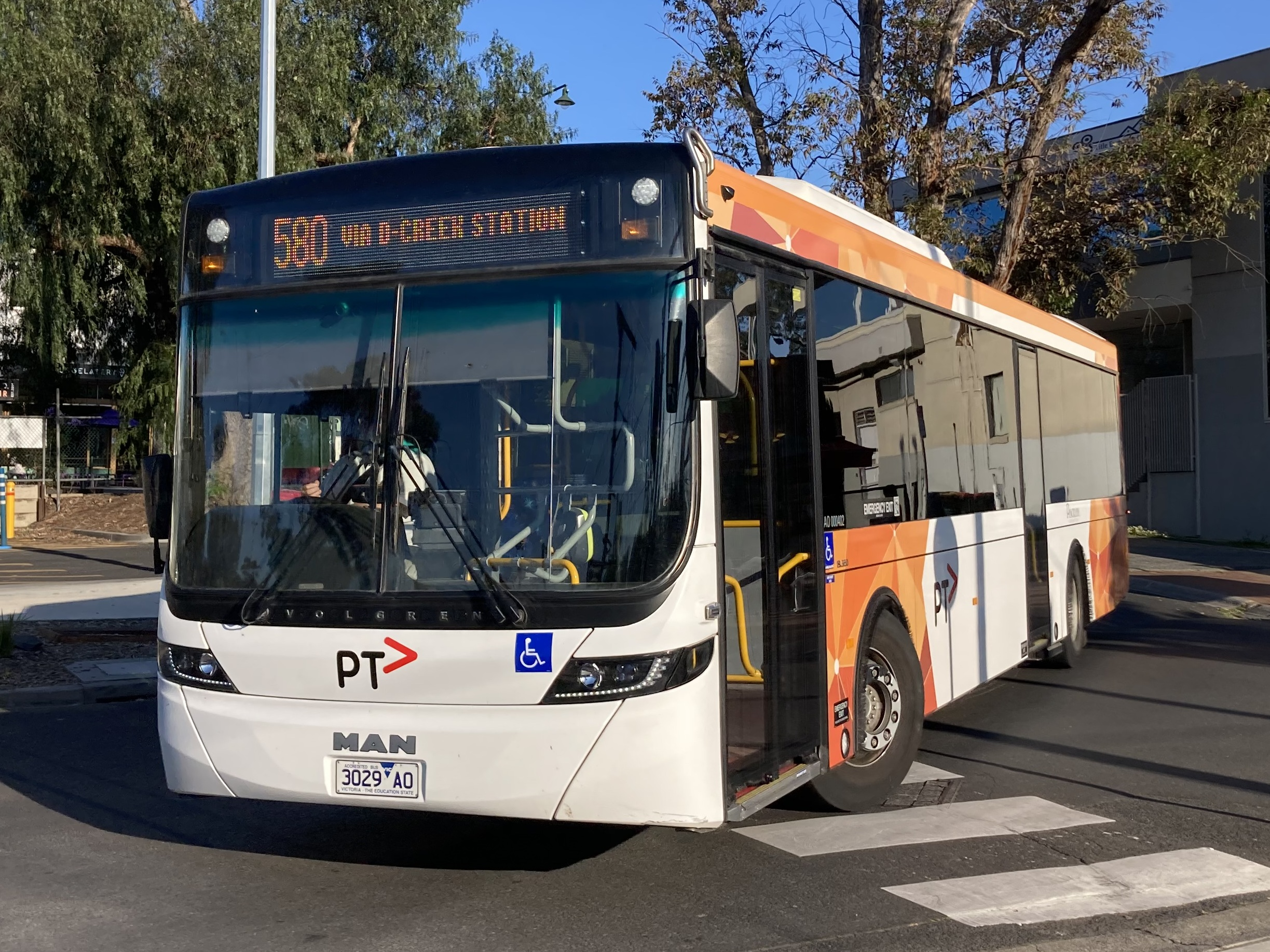
- Volgren bodied MAN 19.320 on route 580 at Eltham station in September 2023
- Parent: Dineen Group
- Headquarters: Diamond Creek
- Service area: North-East Melbourne, North-Eastern Victoria, South-Western Victoria
- Service type: Bus & coach operator
- Depots: Diamond Creek (Melbourne); Shepparton; Rushworth; Kyabram; Colac; Warrnambool
- Fleet: 151 (January 2026)
- Website: www.panoramacoaches.com.au

Panorama Coaches is a school and charter bus and coach operator in Melbourne, Victoria, Australia. It is a subsidiary of the Dineen Group. The company was also a route service operator up until 30 June 2025, it operated five routes under contract to Public Transport Victoria. It continues to operate a large volume of school and charter work.

== History ==
Harry Jewell was a driver at US Motors in the Dandenongs. He formed Panorama Taxi Service in the late 1940s and soon obtained a licence to run a local bus service in the Upwey and Belgrave Heights areas, with services commencing around the start of 1949.

In September 1949, Don Nugent and W McKenzie purchased Panorama Bus Service from H Jewell with route 699 from Belgrave to Upwey.

The business was sold in August 1953 to Messrs Ashby and Jewell and for the next nine years, Nugent operated a taxi company. The bus service continued to trade as Panorama. By 1961 Ashby had dropped out and in 1966 the route went to U.S. Motors, who continued using the Panorama name for the Upwey run.

The Panorama trading name would effectively disappear in February 1972 when U.S. Motors formed a short-lived partnership with John Usher's Croydon Bus Service t/a Invicta and briefly operated as Invicta United Bus Service. This partnership would be dissolved on 3 September 1973 with U.S. Bus Lines re-emerging but now only running the trunk routes in the Dandenongs to Olinda and Gembrook plus the local Belgrave - Upwey & Belgrave South runs.

Timetables issued during the 1970s and early 1980s continued to refer to the 699 to Upwey as the "Panorama route" but otherwise showed U.S. Bus Lines as the operator. A revised 699 timetable issued in The Met format on 29/10/1984 saw an end to any references to Panorama.

Meanwhile, in November 1962, Don Nugent purchased Boronia Bus Lines. A charter operation was established under the name Australian Rambler Coaches and the route services sold in September 1970 to Ventura Bus Lines.

In October 1985, Nugent became a shareholder in the Clipper Tours business in Sydney. The Australian Rambler livery was adopted and a few coaches transferred.

In January 1989, Australian Rambler Coaches was sold to Cobb & Co with Nugent retaining 15 coaches and reactivating the Panorama Coaches name. In October 1990, Panorama Coaches was sold to the Dineen Group with 13 buses and coaches.

In May 1991, Hurstbridge Coaches was purchased by the Dineen Group. Both operations were later consolidated under the Panorama Coaches name.

In 2003, Panorama Coaches successfully tendered and won route 580 between Eltham and Diamond Creek, and in 2018, it successfully tendered and won route 343 between Greensborough and Hurstbridge.

The five Panorama PTV routes, 343, 578, 579, 580 and 582, were transferred to Dysons effective 1 July 2025, as the latter was successful in its tender to operate the five routes. By that point, Panorama had operated route services for 35 years. After the transfer of the PTV routes, Panorama continues to operate charter and school bus services.

In January 2026, Panorama Coaches acquired 14 vehicles and around 13 school bus routes from Jacobsons Coach Tours. The expansion prompted the opening of a new depot in Shepparton.

== Fleet ==
As at June 2026, the fleet consists of 148 buses and coaches. Fleet livery is white with maroon and blue stripes while some route buses carry the Public Transport Victoria orange and white livery.
