= Public Transport Corporation =

Former statutory authority of the government of Victoria, Australia

- The Met logo in teal & sunflower

Statutory Authority overview
- Formed: 1 July 1989
- Preceding Statutory Authority: Metropolitan Transit Authority State Transport Authority
- Superseding Statutory Authority: Director of Public Transport
- Jurisdiction: Victoria
- Headquarters: Melbourne
- Parent Statutory Authority: Department of Transport
- Key document: Transport (Amendment) Act 1989

The Public Transport Corporation (PTC) was a Victoria State Government owned statutory authority formed under the Transport Act 1983 which operated passenger and freight trains, trams and bus services.

The PTC was also responsible for directly operating some bus services and procuring bus services from private operators. It was established on 1 July 1989 as a result of the passage and commencement of the Transport (Amendment) Act 1989 to manage the responsibilities of the State Transport Authority and the Metropolitan Transit Authority. In suburban Melbourne it continued to be referred to by the MTA's nickname of The Met, while in regional Victoria it operated as V/Line.

The operational rail and tram activities of the PTC were franchised in 1999 by the Kennett Government through the intermediary of a new agency, the Director of Public Transport, a statutory office within the Department of Transport. The director was required to enter into franchise agreements with private rail and tram companies for the on-the-ground delivery of public transport services. The land and infrastructure assets of the Public Transport Corporation were transferred to another new agency, VicTrack, who then leased those assets to the Director of Public Transport, which in turn sub-leased the assets to the private operators.

== Formation ==
Tangerine V/Line logo from the 1980s

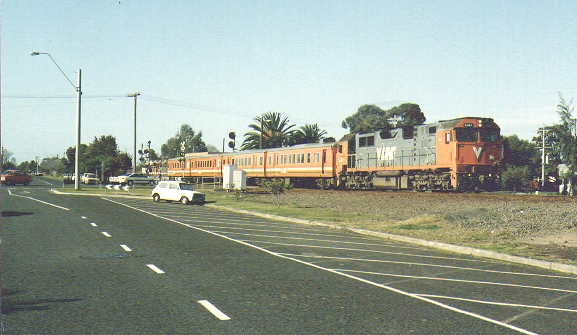
V/Line branded train, 1993

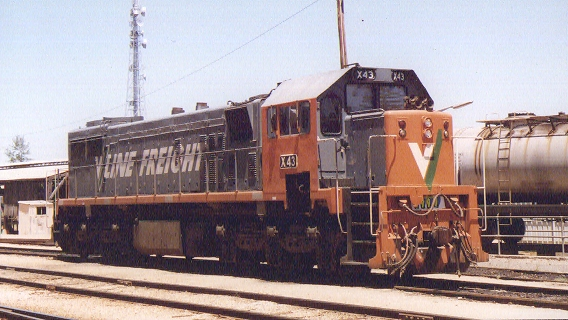
V/Line Freight livered X43, 1992

The Public Transport Corporation was initially established under changes made to the Transport Act 1983 by the Transport (Amendment) Act 1989. The statutory changes abolished the former State Transport Authority and Metropolitan Transit Authority thereby creating the Public Transport Corporation in its place. The functions of the PTC were an amalgamation of those of its two predecessors. The green and gold livery on vehicles was retained, though with a new double arrow logo.

The PTC was subject to the control and general direction of the former Director-General of Transport initially and then later to the Secretary to the Department of Transport and, ultimately, the Minister for Transport. A 14-member Public Transport Corporation Board was appointed by the Minister to provide advice to the Chief Executive of the PTC.

== Rollingstock ==
Suburban Trains
Type	Image	Top Speed (km/h)	Built	Number	In Service	Notes
Hitachi		116	1972–1981	355	1972–2014	
Comeng		115	1981–1989	370	1981–present	
Refurbished Harris		130	1982–1983	16	1982–1992	Commonly known as "Grey Ghosts"
4D		130	1992	1	1992–2002	A Prototype for double deck trains, Withdrawn in 2002 and was stored for 4 years, in 2006 it was bought and scrapped at the Brooklyn Tip

Trams
Type	Image	Built	Number	In Service	Notes
W Class		1939–1940	?	1923–present	
Z Class		1975–1984	100	1975–present	
A Class		1984–1986	70	1984–present	
B Class		1984–1994	132	1984–present	

== Demise ==
Franchising of the PTC commenced under the Kennett Government of the 1990s. Privatisation began with some of the bus operations in December 1993. V/Line was split into Passenger and Freight divisions, with the latter sold outright. The Met was divided into Bayside Trains, Hillside Trains, Swanston Trams and Yarra Trams on 1 July 1998 and these along with V/Line's passenger operations passed to the private sector in August 1999.

These separate bodies were all franchised separately as follows:

- Doncaster East & Fitzroy North bus depots → 1993 National Bus Company → 2013 Transdev Melbourne → 2022 Kinetic Melbourne
- Footscray & Sandringham bus depots → 1998 Melbourne Bus Link → 2013 Transdev Melbourne → 2022 Kinetic Melbourne
- V/Line Freight → 1999 Freight Victoria → 2004 Pacific National
- V/Line Passenger → 1999 National Express Group → 2002 State Government, receivers appointed → 2003 State Government
- Bayside Trains → 1999 National Express Group (M>Train) → 2002 State Government, receivers appointed → 2004 Connex Melbourne → 2009 Metro Trains Melbourne
- Hillside Trains → 1999 Connex Melbourne → 2009 Metro Trains Melbourne
- Swanston Trams → 1999 National Express Group (M>Tram) → 2002 State Government, receivers appointed → 2004 TransdevTSL → 2009 Keolis Downer → 2024 Yarra Journey Makers
- Yarra Trams → 1999 TransdevTSL → 2009 Keolis Downer → 2024 Yarra Journey Makers

The remaining functions of the corporation were transferred to Metlink, later Public Transport Victoria.

== See also ==
- Public Record Office Victoria – Metropolitan Transit Authority
- Public Record Office Victoria – State Transport Authority
- Public Record Office Victoria – Public Transport Corporation

Preceded by State Transport Authority	Passenger rail in Victoria; 1989–1999	Succeeded by V/Line Passenger
Preceded by State Transport Authority	Freight rail in Victoria; 1989–1999	Succeeded by Freight Victoria
Preceded by Metropolitan Transit Authority	Buses in Melbourne; 1989–1998	Succeeded by National Bus Company; Melbourne Bus Link
Preceded by Metropolitan Transit Authority	Railways in Melbourne; 1989–1999	Succeeded by Connex Melbourne; M>Train
Preceded by Metropolitan Transit Authority	Trams in Melbourne; 1989–1999	Succeeded by M>Tram; Yarra Trams
