= Coach Design =

Australian bus bodybuilder

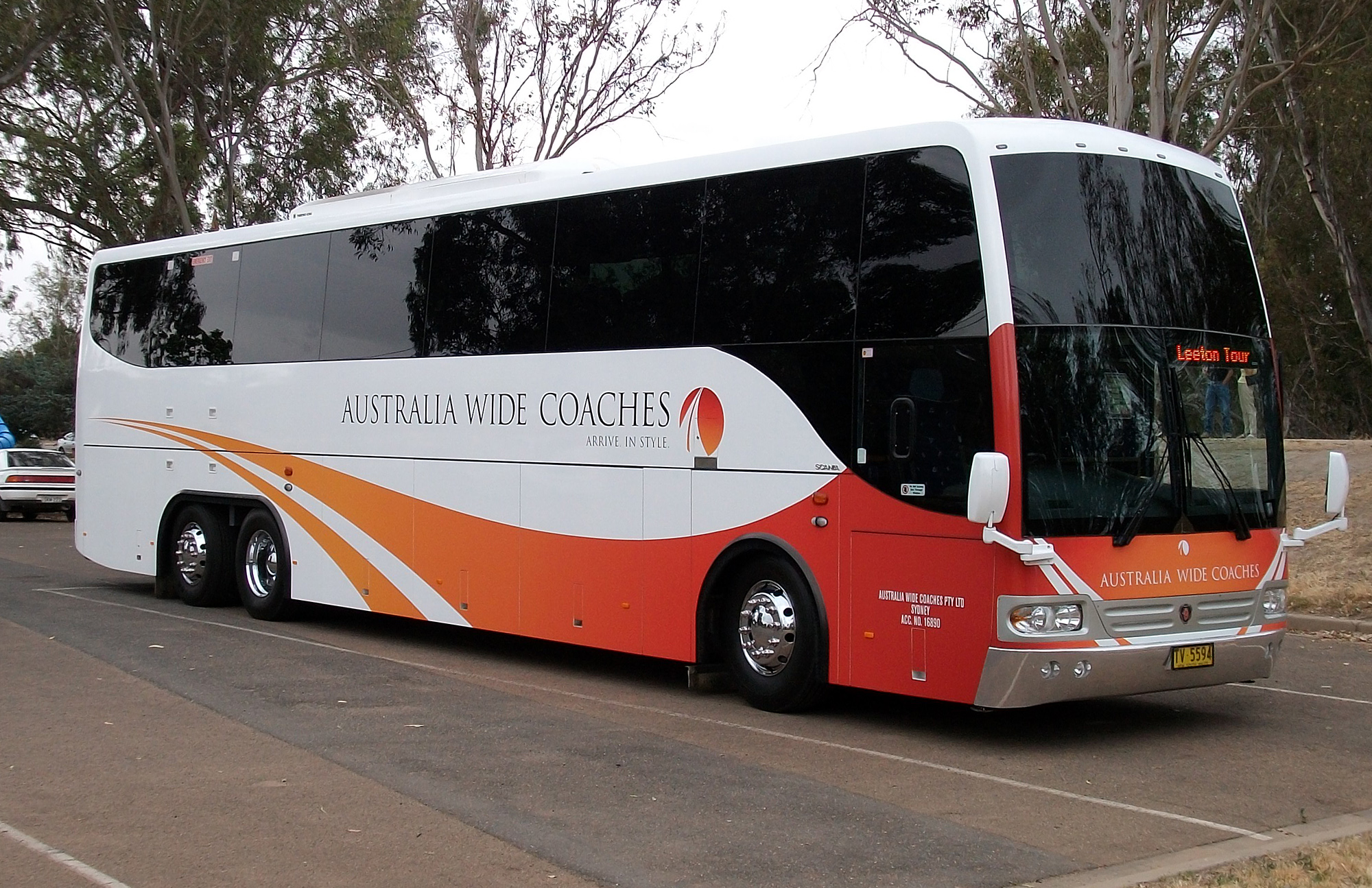
- Australia Wide Coaches Scania K480EB in Wagga Wagga in November 2009
- Industry: Bus manufacturing
- Predecessor: Gamer Brewer & Winter
- Founded: 1992
- Headquarters: Archerfield
- Parent: Chryss Jamieson
- Website: coachdesign.com.au

Coach Design is an Australian bus bodybuilder in Archerfield, Brisbane. Until 1992 it traded as GBW.
