= Paris City Vision =

French tour operator

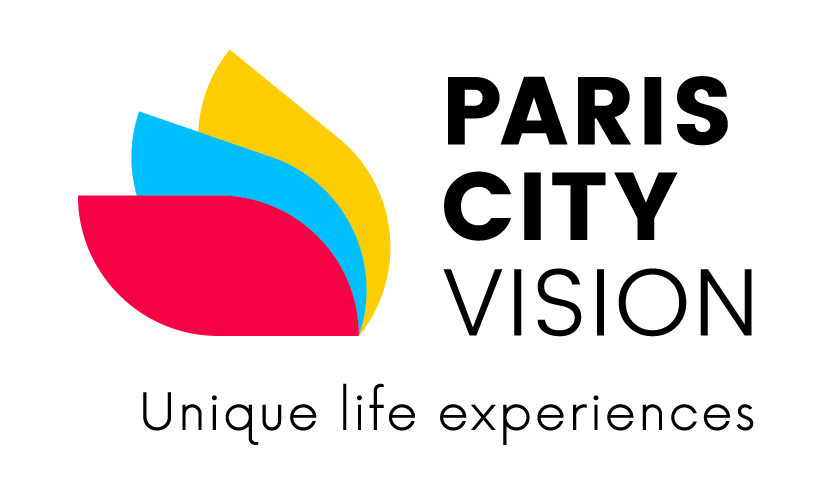
- Company type: Privately held company
- Industry: Travel and Leisure
- Founded: France (1929)
- Fate: Acquired by Ekkio Capital
- Headquarters: Paris, France
- Area served: France
- Website: www.pariscityvision.com

Paris City Vision is a tour operator in Paris and other parts of France. Founded in 1929 as Paris Vision, the company is one of the oldest professional tourism businesses in Paris.

Paris changed its commercial name to become Paris City Vision after its merger with Cityrama in 2010.

The CityVision group is also a shareholder in Paris City Vision La Marina, which owns boat restaurants on the River Seine.

In 2015, the investment fund Ekkio Capital bought the CityVision group.

Paris City Vision owns Paris franchise for Gray Line.

== History ==
Paris City Vision was created through successive mergers of different activities: tour bus and minibus excursions and cruises on the Seine.

The CityVision group has 200 employees and had a 2015 sales figure of 62 million euros.

Localers is a walking tours specialist that was founded in 2012 and joined the CityVision Group in 2016.
