= Driver Group =

Australian bus operator

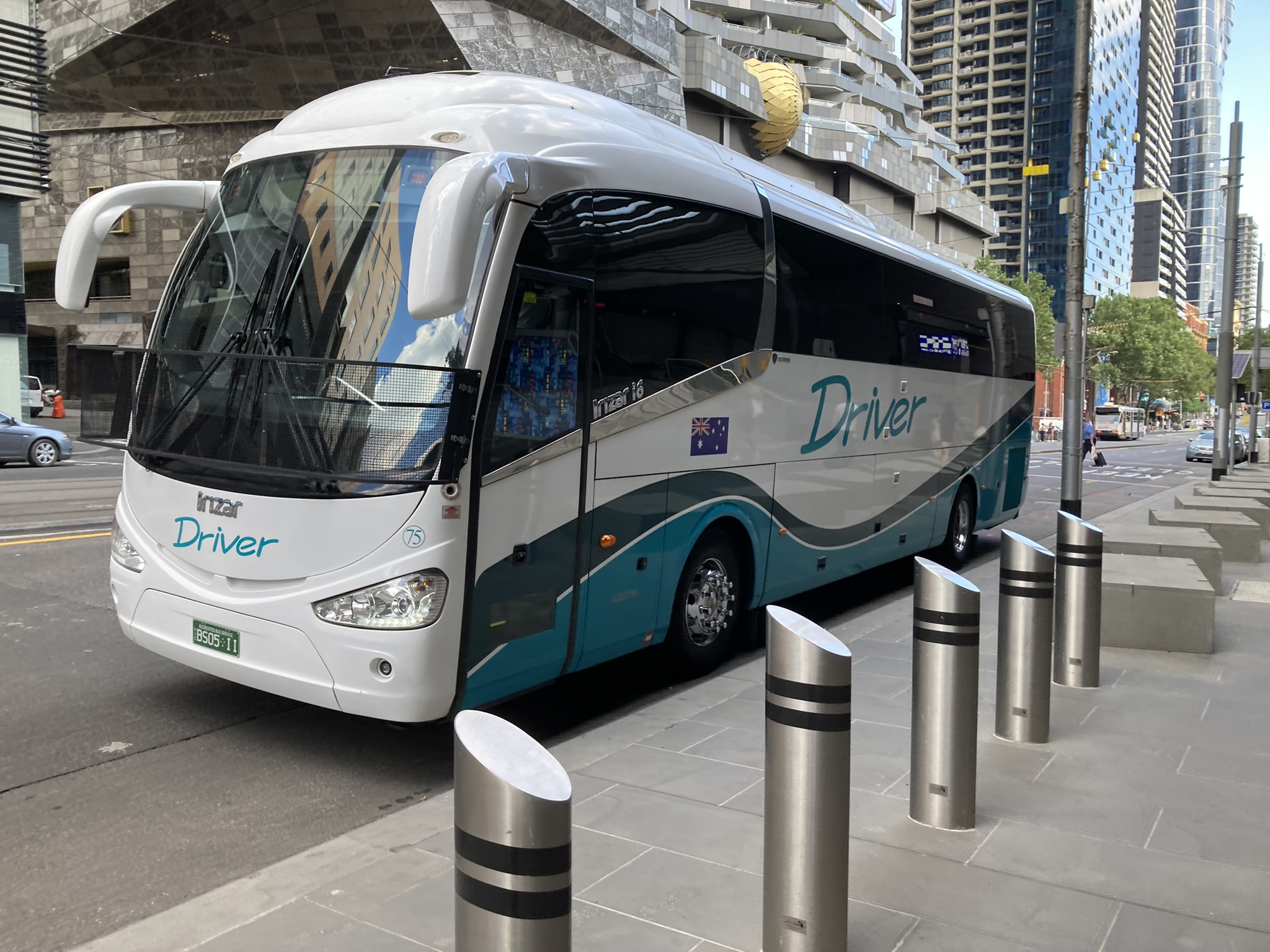
- Irizar bodied Scania K310IB in January 2022
- Founded: March 1931
- Headquarters: Mount Waverley
- Service area: Melbourne
- Service type: Bus & coach operator
- Fleet: 148 (November 2023)
- Website: www.drivergroup.com.au

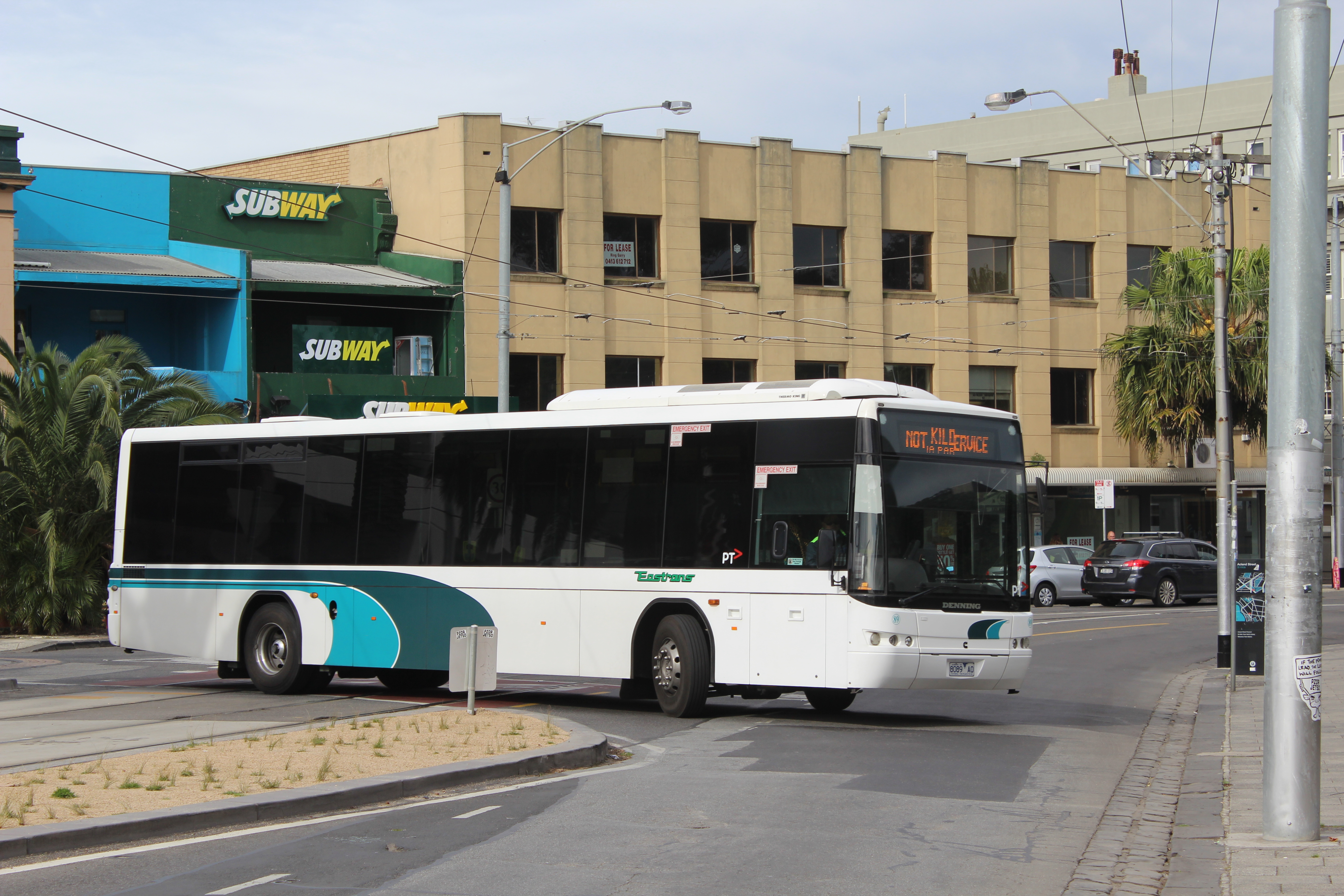
Former Driver Group Denning Manufacturing bus now with CDC Melbourne in September 2013

Driver Group is a bus and coach operator in Melbourne, Australia. In July 2013 the five bus routes it operated were sold to CDC Victoria and was rebranded CDC Melbourne afterwards.

== History ==
Driver Brothers was formed in March 1931, when Eric and Reg Driver built two 7 seat Pontiacs and began operating a service from Glen Iris railway station to Camberwell. In the 1960s the route was extended to the new Chadstone Shopping Centre. In 1962 the operation was renamed Driver Bus Lines and at the end of the decade Eric's two sons, Daryl and Gary, joined the business.

In 1970, Driver Bus Lines diversified into the coach market and in January 1978 purchased the Camberwell to Box Hill service from RW Curren. In 1986 Shave Bus Service was purchased and renamed Waverley Transit.

In May 1989, the Pioneer Tours Melbourne day sightseeing business was purchased from Pioneer Trailways. In February 1991 Driver Bus Lines was awarded the Gray Line franchise for Melbourne and renamed its sightseeing operation Pioneer Gray Line. In October 1992 the Great Sights sightseeing brand was launched and Melbright Coaches purchased.

In June 1994 Sydney tour operator Great Sights South Pacific was purchased. In July 1996 Driver Bus Lines was renamed Driver Group. In December 1996 Clipper Tours, the Sydney operator of the Gray Line franchise, was purchased. After the Gray Line part of the business was separated, Clipper Tours was resold to Ron Deane in February 1998.

Over the next decade Driver Group would gradually buy the Gray Line Australia franchises in all other capital cities. In October 2010 Mornington Peninsula operators Balnarring Bus Lines, Coolart Bus & Coach, Mawson's Coaches and Old Tyabb Coaches were purchased adding 29 buses to the fleet.

Driver Group today operates charters originating in Melbourne and operating to destinations around the country, Great Sights day tours in Melbourne, Sydney and Adelaide and Gray Line Australia day tours in Melbourne, Perth, Cairns, Adelaide, Darwin, Alice Springs and Tasmania.

In July 2013, the route service business was sold to CDC Victoria with five routes and 42 buses. The operation was integrated into CDC Victoria's subsidiary Eastrans until the latter was rebranded CDC Melbourne the following year.

In November 2013 the operation of Gray Line services in Sydney was sub-licensed to Australia Wide Coaches.

== Brands ==
Brands operated by Driver Group include:

- Driver Bus Lines
- Great Sights
- Gray Line Melbourne
- Gray Line

Brands previously used by Driver Group include:

- Driver Brothers
- Driver Coaches
- Clipper Tours
- Gray Line Sydney
- Great Sights South Pacific
- Melbourne Explorer
- Pioneer Gray Line
- Pioneer Tours
- Southern Sights
- Waverley Transit

Brands or companies acquired by Driver Group include:

- Curran's
- Shave Bus Service

== Fleet ==
As at November 2023, Driver Group operated 148 buses and coaches. Driver's fleet livery has long been white and blue. Gray Line coaches are painted white, red and blue.
