= Transdev Melbourne =

Bus operator in Melbourne, Australia

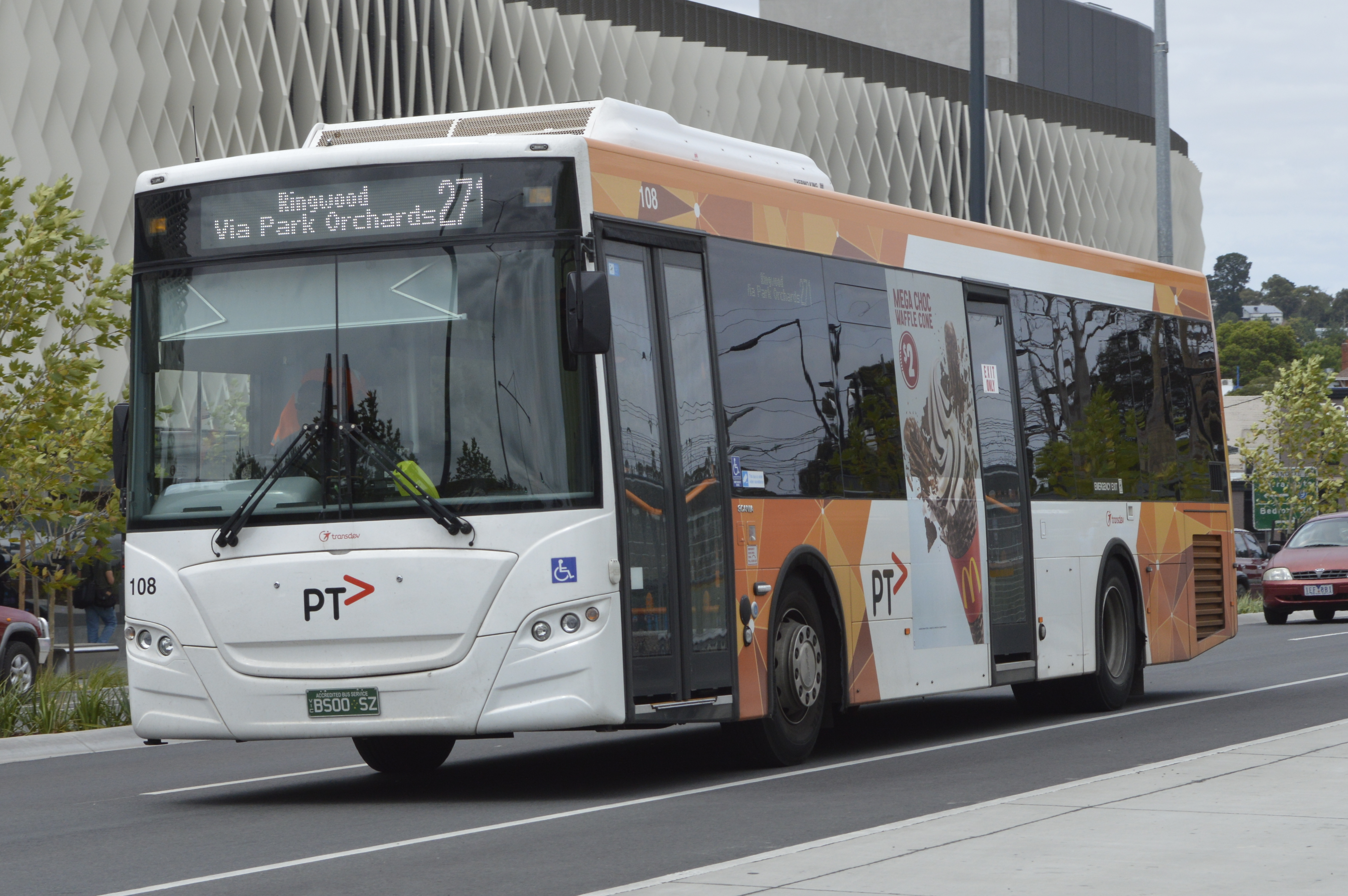
- Gemilang Coachworks bodied Scania K280UB at Ringwood in December 2015
- Parent: Transdev Australasia
- Commenced operation: 4 August 2013; 13 years ago
- Ceased operation: 30 January 2022; 4 years ago
- Service area: Melbourne
- Service type: Bus operator
- Routes: 49 (January 2022)
- Depots: 6
- Fleet: 534 (January 2022)
- Website: www.transdevmelbourne.com.au

Transdev Melbourne was a bus operator in Melbourne, Australia, that operated the Melbourne Bus Franchise with a fleet of 534 buses on 49 bus routes from August 2013 until January 2022, when the franchise was awarded to Kinetic Melbourne. It operated approximately 30% of Melbourne's bus network. It was a subsidiary of Transdev Australasia.

== History ==
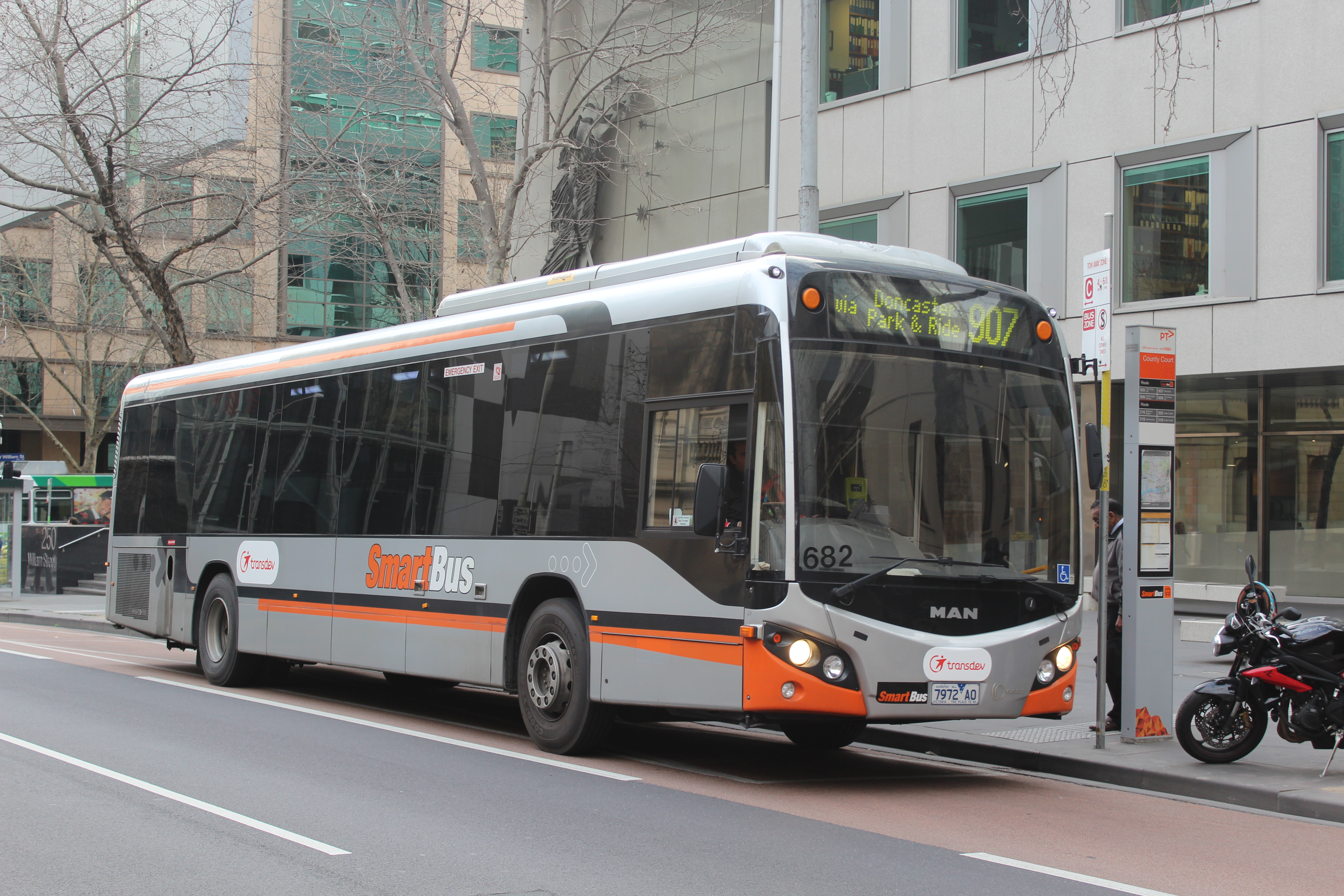
SmartBus liveried Custom Coaches bodied MAN 18.310 on Lonsdale Street in August 2013

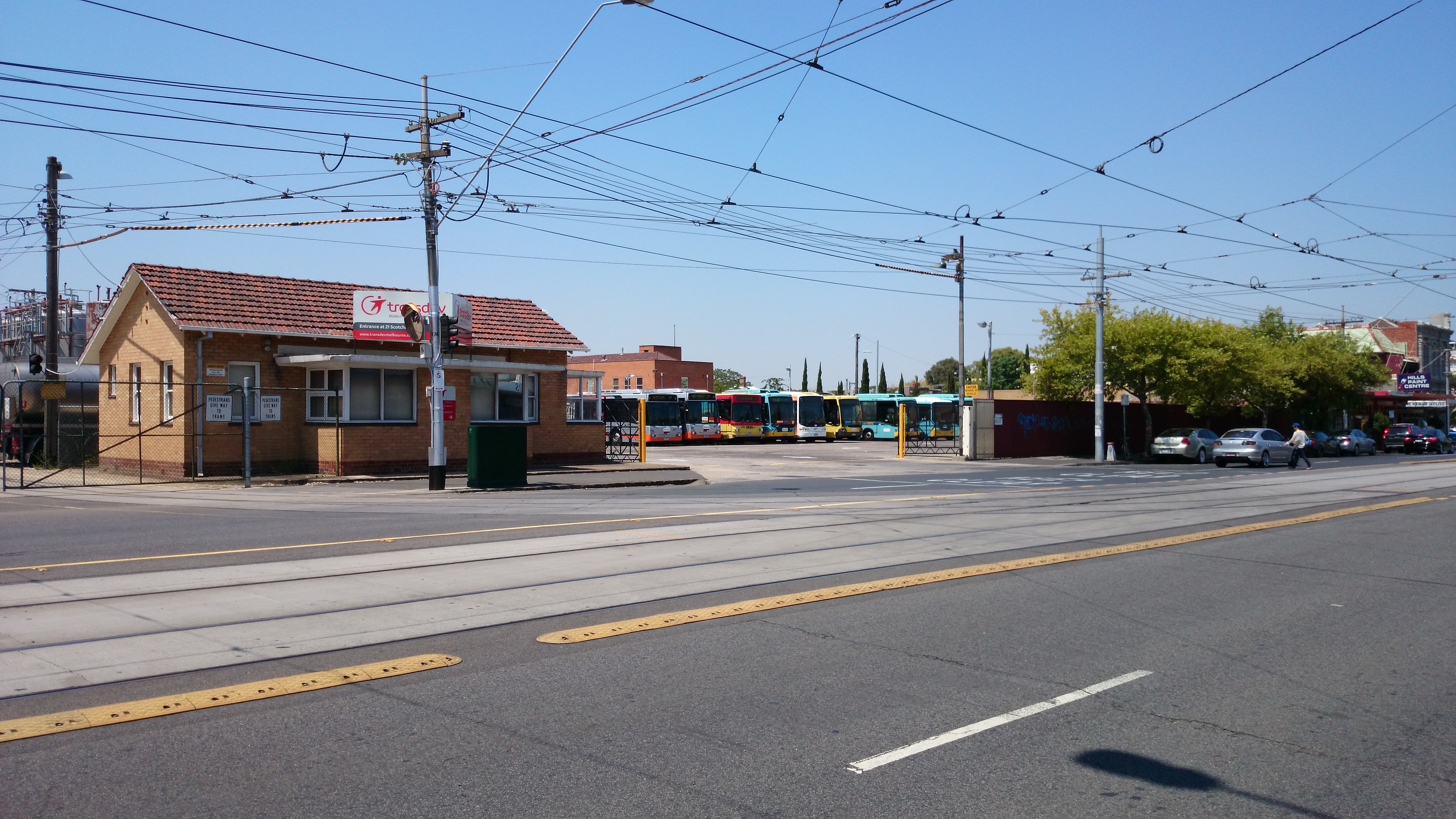
Fitzroy North depot in February 2014

Until the 1990s, most of Transdev Melbourne's routes were operated by the Public Transport Corporation. In December 1993, the Doncaster and Fitzroy North bus depots and associated services were transferred to National Bus Company, formed by Westbus proprietors, Jim Bosnjak and his sister-in-law Carol. The remaining Public Transport Corporation services remained in public ownership until privatised in April 1998, with Dysons and Reservoir Bus Company forming Melbourne Bus Link to take over the services operating out of Footscray and Sandringham depots.

In June 2012, Public Transport Victoria called for expressions of interest for the Melbourne Metropolitan Bus Franchise, involving 30% of the city's bus network, operated by Melbourne Bus Link and National Bus Company, including three SmartBus routes. From ten expressions received, a shortlist of five bidders was selected in August 2012, with FirstGroup, Keolis Downer, National Bus Company (Ventura Bus Lines), Transit Systems, and Transdev invited to tender.

In April 2013, Transdev was awarded the franchise, with operations commencing on 4 August 2013. The franchise was to run for seven years with an option to extend for a further three years. In December 2018, it was announced by the government that the three years extension option will not be taken up, but instead a six-month extension was granted, extending the contract to January 2021. However, in an apparent bid to save jobs and preserve stability in the bus industry due to COVID-19, the contract was extended to 31 January 2022.

In September 2017, safety inspections by Transport Safety Victoria at two Transdev bus depots found 33 defective buses. Twelve of the buses were in such poor condition that they were removed from service for urgent repairs.

After being re-tendered, the contract was awarded to Kinetic Melbourne, which took over on 31 January 2022.

== Routes ==
Transdev Melbourne originally took over the operation of 52 routes spanning Melbourne's metropolitan area, separated into three groups: 40 Eastern routes, nine Western routes and three SmartBus Orbital routes. It also operated 122 school bus services across metropolitan Melbourne.

== Fleet ==
Transdev Melbourne inherited a fleet of approximately 500 buses from Melbourne Bus Link, Ventura Bus Lines and SmartBus operators. When operations ceased in January 2022, the fleet consisted of 534 buses.

The Public Transport Victoria white and orange diamonds livery was being applied, except to SmartBus liveried buses that remained this livery.

== Depots ==
Transdev Melbourne operated from five depots, with two satellite depots. The Eastern network (former National Bus Company) operated out of depots in Doncaster and Fitzroy North, while the Western network (former Melbourne Bus Link) operated depots in Footscray and Sandringham. The SmartBus Orbital fleet operated out of Keysborough depot (formerly owned by Grenda's Bus Service), as well as two interim satellite depots at Dysons in Reservoir, and Tullamarine Bus Lines in Airport West, with a requirement to establish a more permanent storage solution by 2017.

New depots opened at Heatherton, Sunshine West and Thomastown in September 2016, October 2016 and March 2017 to replace the Sandringham, Footscray and satellite depots respectively. The Doncaster and Fitzroy North depots were also rebuilt as part of an upgrade program. A temporary depot was set up in North Melbourne while these works occurred.
