= Kinetic Melbourne =

Bus operator

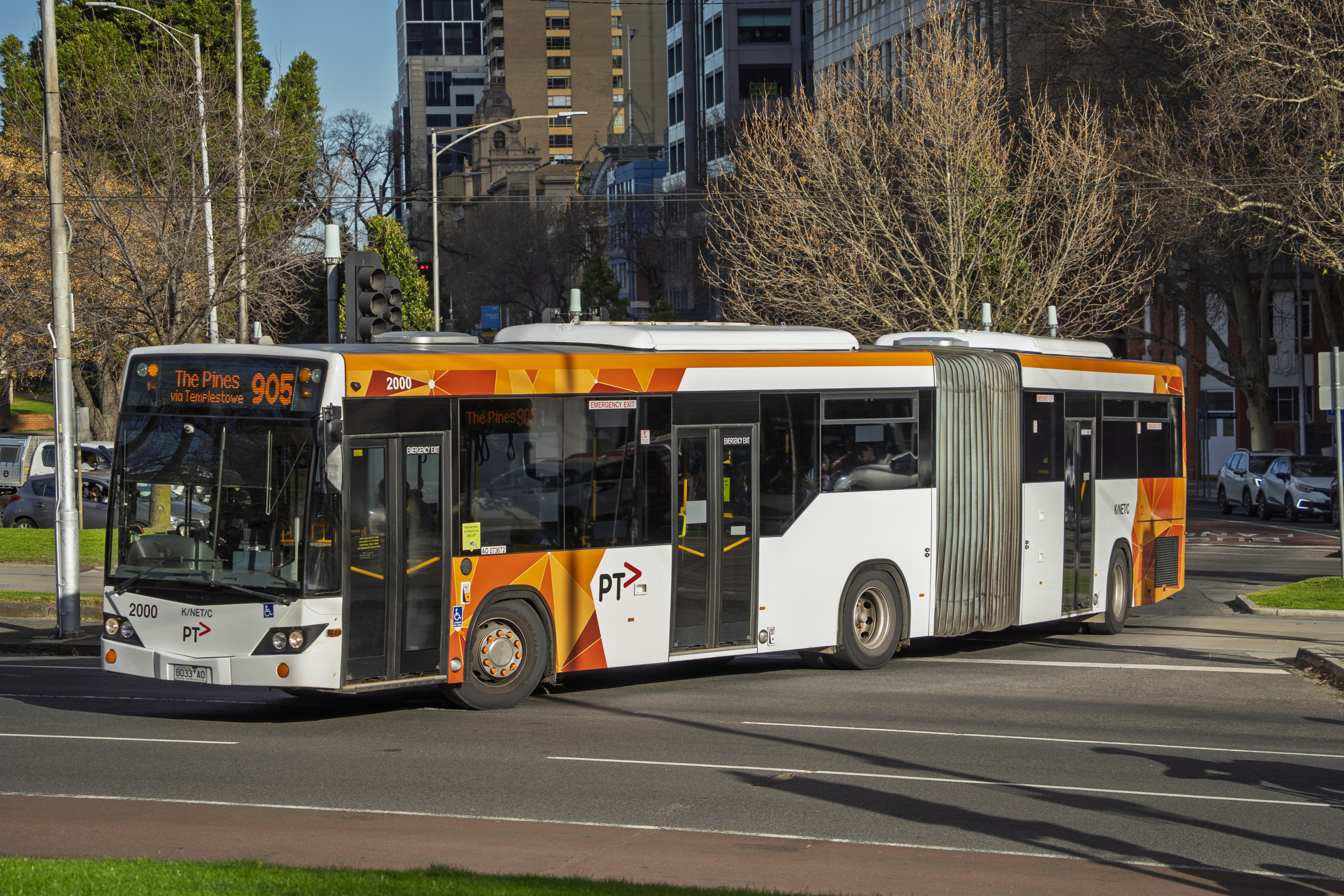
- Custom Coaches bodied Scania K310UA on Victoria Parade in July 2025
- Parent: Kinetic Group
- Commenced operation: 31 January 2022
- Service area: Melbourne
- Service type: Bus operator
- Routes: 52
- Depots: Doncaster; Fitzroy North; Heatherton; Keysborough; Sunshine West; Thomastown
- Fleet: 602 (June 2024)
- Website: www.wearekinetic.com

Kinetic Melbourne is a bus operator in Melbourne, Australia, operating a fleet of 602 buses on 45 bus routes, as well as seven SmartBus routes. It commenced operations on 31 January 2022, taking over all routes previously operated by Transdev Melbourne. It is a subsidiary of the Kinetic Group.

== History ==
In October 2021, the Victorian Department of Transport awarded Kinetic Melbourne a contract to operate the Melbourne Bus Franchise until June 2031. It commenced operations on 31 January 2022.

On 2 October 2023, Kinetic acquired two routes, 510 and 512, with 10 buses from MorelandBus.

In September 2024, it was announced that Kinetic had been awarded one of Melbourne's new Zero Electric Bus (ZEB) franchises in the city's north. The franchise includes routes 510 and 512, which Kinetic already had, and twelve routes operated by Dysons. The twelve routes to be taken over from Dysons were 503, 504, 505, 506, 508, 509, 546, 552, 553, 558, 567 and 609. Kinetic took over the twelve routes on 1 July 2025.

== Services ==
Kinetic Melbourne took over the operation of 52 routes spanning Melbourne's metropolitan area, which include three SmartBus orbital routes and the Doncaster Area Rapid Transit (DART) routes.

== Fleet ==
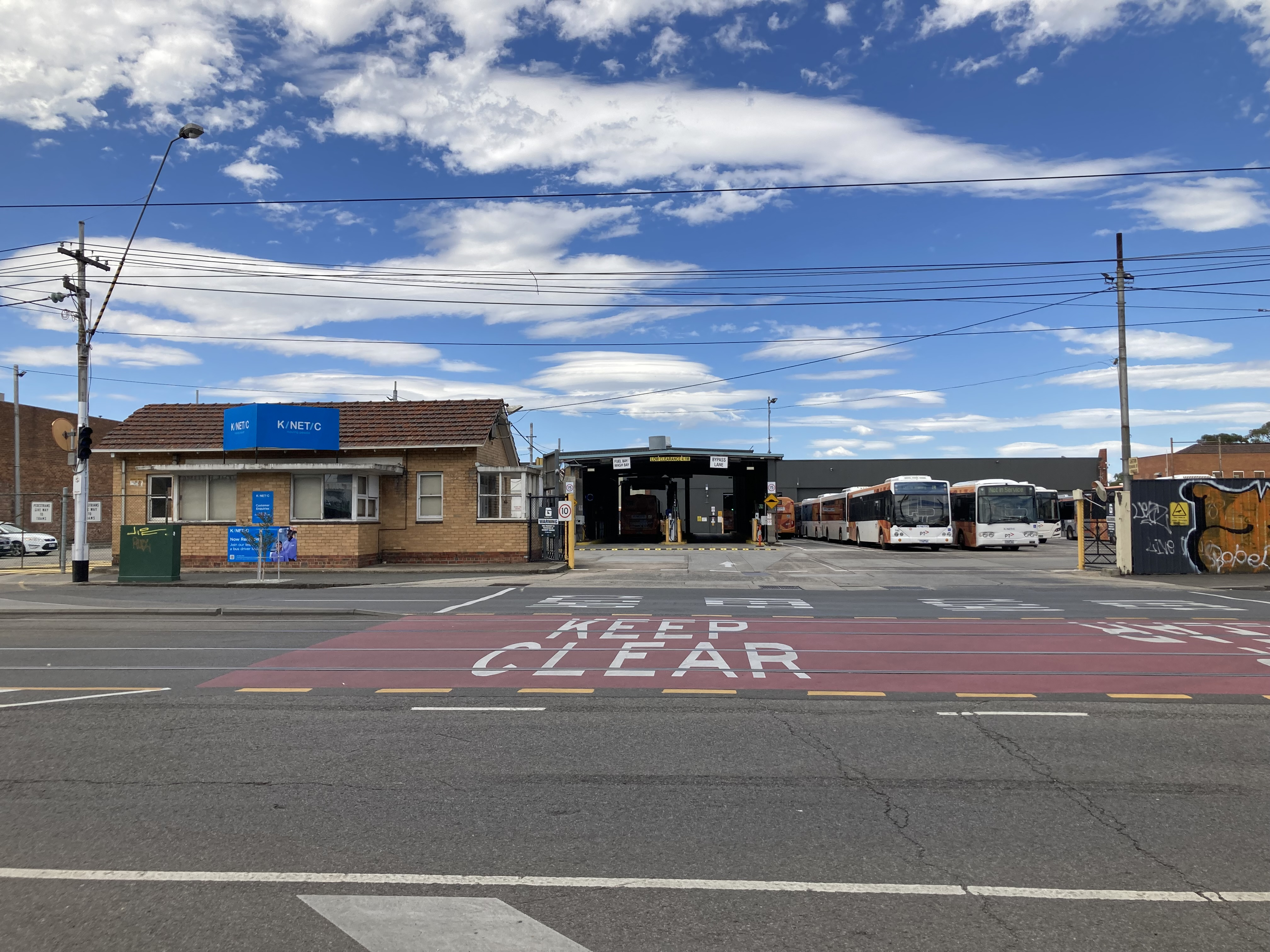
Kinetic Melbourne's Fitzroy North bus depot in March 2023

Kinetic Melbourne commenced operations with 531 buses transferred from Transdev Melbourne. As part of the contract, 36 zero-emissions buses will be introduced to the fleet by mid-2025 and 341 of the 531 buses will be replaced with low to zero-emissions buses.

Ten buses were acquired from Morelandbus as part of the sale of routes 510 and 512 to Kinetic. Additional buses were also transferred from the closed-down Kinetic Sydney operation prior to the start of the ZEB franchise in July 2025. As at June 2024, the fleet consists of 602 buses.

Most buses are painted in the Public Transport Victoria livery, except for SmartBus liveried buses that have retained this livery for use on SmartBus routes.
