= Gray Line Worldwide =

International sightseeing company

- Founded: 1910
- Headquarters: Denver, Colorado
- Service area: Worldwide
- Service type: Sightseeing Tours
- Operator: 100+ licensees worldwide
- Chief executive: Griffin Hanbury
- Website: www.grayline.com

Gray Line Worldwide is an international sightseeing company that consist of local sightseeing operators around the world. The company was founded in 1910 and operates worldwide through independent operators it calls "licensees" with a presence in most of the world's most popular sightseeing destinations. Gray Line does not provide sightseeing services directly, but rather provides its brand, promotional services and booking systems to licensees. Gray Line is also the largest direct supplier of destination services to online travel sellers, wholesalers and travel agents.

== History ==
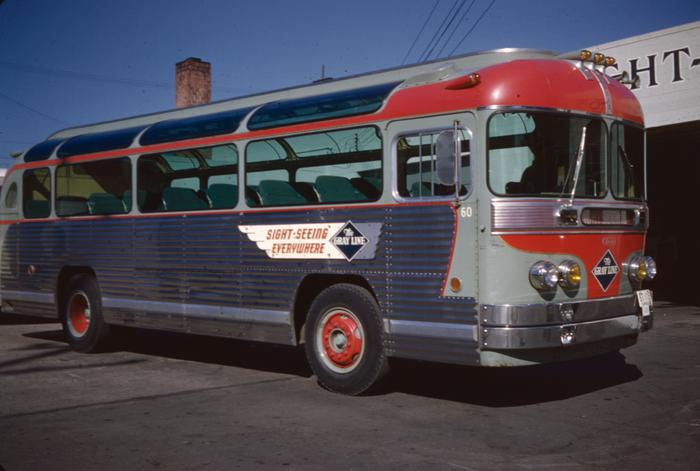
A Seattle Gray Line bus at its terminal, circa 1951

In March 1910, a young restaurateur called Louis Bush refurbished an old Mack Truck chassis, painted it blue and gray and began offering sightseeing tours around the city of Washington, D.C.

By 1926, Gray Line had expanded to other booming cities including New York, Chicago, Detroit, New Orleans, Los Angeles, San Francisco, as well as internationally to Toronto and Havana. With peacetime following World War II, Harry J. Dooley, a former Gray Line employee, acquired the company and helped re-establish Gray Line Chicago. Dooley soon became president of Gray Line and is today considered the father of the sightseeing industry.

With the advent of jet travel and increased gateways in the late 1940s and early 1950s, Dooley expanded Gray Line's market throughout the United States and established Gray Line companies in Canada, Mexico, Hawaii and Puerto Rico. The sudden popularity growth in motorcoach sightseeing helped position Gray Line as a leader in the sightseeing industry.

The brand is currently managed from an office based in Denver, Colorado.

Gray Line has a presence in over 700 locations, spanning six continents, and is the largest sightseeing company in the world. In 2018 its carriers handled over 35 million passengers.

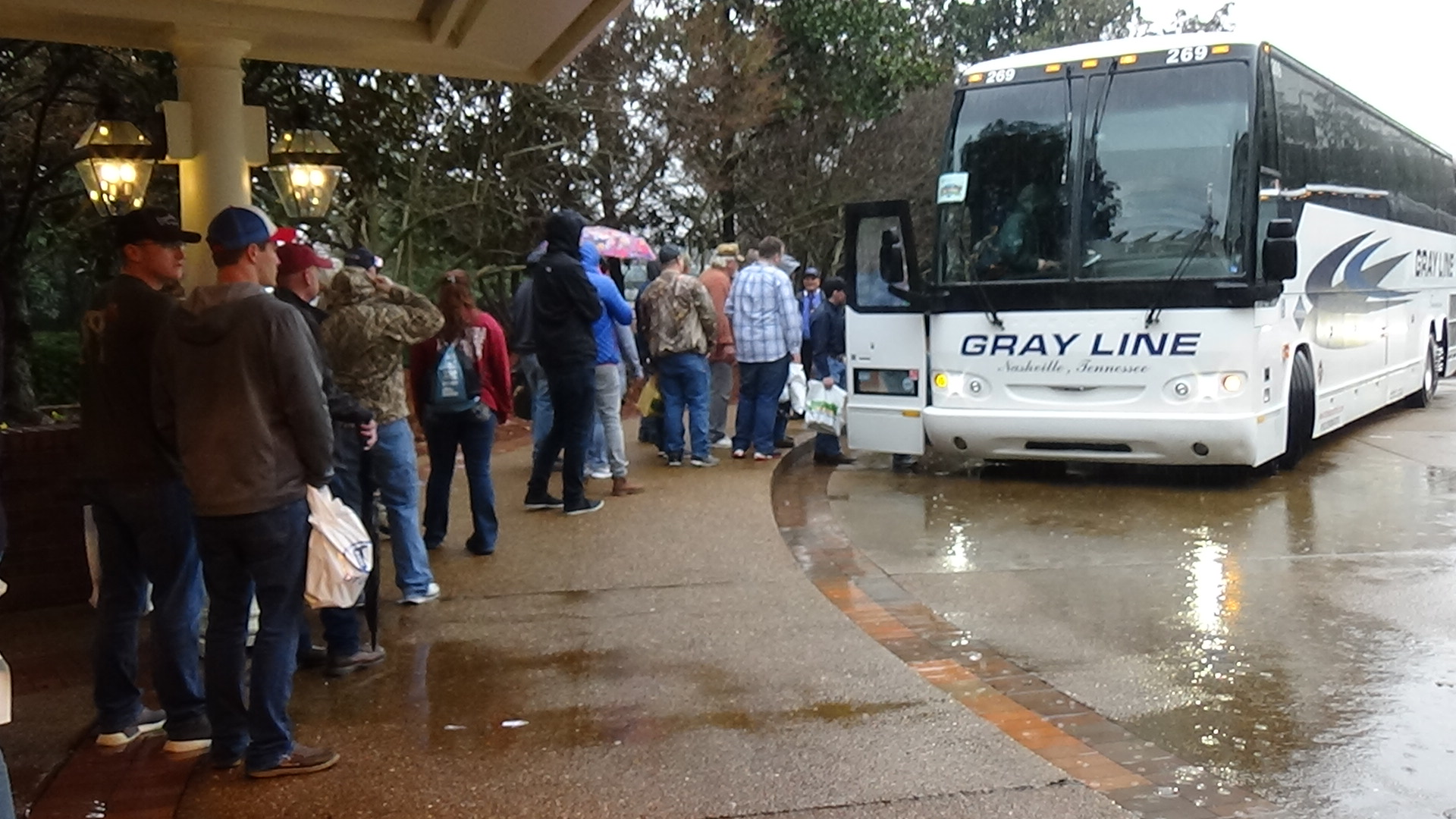
People boarding a Gray Line bus in Nashville, Tennessee, 2018.

== Licensees ==
Location	Operator
Argentina	AV & MV SRL
Australia	Driver Group
Australia (Melbourne)	Driver Group Australia
Australia (Tasmania)	Experience Tasmania Tours
Austria (Vienna)	White Alligator Tours
Brazil	Brazil 4 You Operadora Receptiva
Canada (Montreal, QC)	Coach Canada
Canada (British Columbia)	West Coast Sightseeing
Canada (Toronto, ON)	Gray Line Toronto
Canada (Ottawa, ON)	Gray Line Ottawa
Canada (Niagara, ON)	Miagara Majestic Tours
Canada (Halifax, NS)	Ambassatours
Canada (Prince Edward Island)	Ambassatours
Canada (Vancouver, BC)	Westcoast Sightseeing
Canada (Victoria, BC)	Pacific Coast Sightseeing
Chile	Chirak Tour
China (Beijing)	DTI, Ltd.
China (Hong Kong)	Gray Line Tours of Hong Kong Limited
China (Shanghai)	DTI Ltd.
Colombia	Respresentaciones Irigoyen Vega Cia Ltd
Costa Rica	Fantasy Tours
Croatia	Adriatic 4 You
Czech Republic	Bohemia Travel
Dominican Republic	Transporte Turistico F&S Tours
Ecuador	Combratur
Egypt	South Sinai Travel
France (Paris)	ParisCityVision
Germany (Berlin)	Bus Verkehr Berlin
Germany (Munich)	Autobus Oberbayern
Greece (Athens)	Athens Open Tour
Guatemala	Reuxtreme-Reustours
Hungary	Cityrama
Iceland	Gray Line Iceland
Indonesia	P.T. Regina Alta Panorama Tours
Ireland	The Dualway Group
Israel	Consolidated Tour Operators Ltd.
Italy (Florence)	CAF Tours
Italy (Rome)	Carrani Tours
Italy (Sorrento)	Travel Etc.
Italy (Venice)	Park Viaggi S.R.L.
Macau	Gray Line Tours Hong Kong Limited
Malta	Supreme Travel
Mexico (Cancun)	Mayaland Tours
Mexico (Los Cabos)	Gray Line Los Cabos SA de CV
Mexico (Puerto Vallarta)	Gray Line Los Cabos SA de CV
Morocco	Utess Voyages
Netherlands (Amsterdam)	Blue Boat Company
New Zealand	InterCity
Oman	Kurban Tours
Panama	Gray Line Panama
Peru	Viajes Pacífico
Portugal	Cityrama
Puerto Rico	Charter Coach Inc.
Romania	Gray Line Romania
Scotland	Edinburgh Coach Lines
Spain	Autocares Julia, SL
Switzerland (Geneva)	Keytours S.A.
Switzerland (Zurich)	Hans Meier Tourist AG
Turkey	Plan Tours
United Arab Emirates	Kurban Tours
UK (York)	Golden Tours, operated by York Pullman
UK (London)	Golden Tours
US (Washington, DC)	Martz Group
US (Oregon)	Road & Rail Travel, LLC
US (Orlando, FL)	Gator Tours of Orlando, LLC
US (Northern California)	Autocares Julia, SL
US (Myrtle Beach, SC)	Leisure Time Unlimited, Inc.
US (New Orleans, LA)	New Orleans Steamboat Company
US (New York, NY)	Coach USA
US (Las Vegas, NV)	GL Vegas, Inc.
US (Boston, MA)	Brush Hill Tours
US (Branson, MO)	Thompson Transportation Group, LLC
US (Asheville, NC)	Asheville Trolley Company, LLC
US (Alaska)	Holland America Group
US (Charleston, SC)	M&S Holding Co.
US (Chicago, IL)	Aries Charter
US (Colorado)	Colorado Tour Line
US (Los Angeles, CA)	Gl Vegas, Inc.
US (Miami, FL)	Miami Incoming Services, LLC
US (Minneapolis, MN)	Schmitty & Sons Transit, Inc.
US (San Antonio, TX)	Star Shuttle & Charter
US (Savannah, GA)	Kelly Tours
US (Seattle, WA)	City Sightseeing Seattle
US (Tennessee)	Gray Line of Tennessee / RLCL Acquisition, LLC
US (Tucson, AZ)	Gray Line Tours
Venezuela	Candes Turismo
Vietnam	Threeland Travel
