= Skennars =

Australian coach company

- Parent: Clarrie Skennar
- Founded: 1956
- Ceased operation: 1992
- Headquarters: Fortitude Valley
- Service area: Queensland; New South Wales
- Service type: Coach services
- Destinations: Charleville; Gold Coast; Moree; Mount Isa; Sunshine Coast; Sydney; Tenterfield; Toowoomba
- Hubs: Brisbane Transit Centre
- Depots: Fortitude Valley; Port Macquarie

Skennars was an Australian interstate coach operator.

== History ==
Clarrie Skennar began operating coach services in southern Queensland in 1956. By 1960 he was running a service from the Goondiwindi Shell Garage to the Barnes Auto Depot in North Quay, Brisbane using two Volkswagen Kombi vans, using the Shell Garage beside the Ambulance Centre. At that time, Border Coaches operated an interstate service from Boggabilla in New South Wales to Brisbane, without a permit to pick up passengers within Queensland. Skennar purchased the service and operated it using two newly acquired side-loading vehicles (an International and a Dodge).

Skennar next purchased the Stanthorpe to Warwick service operated by Grimley's Coaches; the termini were the Stanthorpe Shell Garage and the Grand Hotel in Grafton Street, Warwick. The Warwick terminus moved in 1952 to the Shell Garage, and the service was later extended at its western end to Tenterfield, New South Wales.

During the 1960s, Skennar based himself at Warwick, on the same property still used as a bus depot by Crisps Coaches. It was here that he started toying with conversion of front-engined coach chassis to rear-engined setups. One of these conversions utilised the lengthened chassis of a former fire engine, subsequently bodied (in timber) by Watt Brothers Coach builders in Brisbane.

The Skennars Brisbane depot moved several times over the years. From North Quay, operations moved to Upper Roma Street, then to Barry Parade in Fortitude Valley (with a workshop in Doggett Street), and finally to the Brisbane Transit Centre.

By late 1962, Skennar won a ballot for the Brisbane to Noosa licence and was moving to give a service from Noosa south west to Boggabilla and west to Mount Isa, but the bad roads west were not helping, so he stopped the service at Charleville until the roads were improved. Running a daily service to and from Charleville with additional services to Roma six days per week. At its peak the fleet consisted of 62 coaches. Skennars operated long-distance coach services throughout Queensland. It also operated services in New South Wales to Sydney via the Pacific Highway and to Tenterfield and Moree.

In 1989 the Skennars business began to be broken up. The Brisbane to Sydney service was sold to Lindsay's of Coffs Harbour, Brisbane to Gold Coast to Coachtrans, Brisbane to the Sunshine Coast to Sunshine Coast Coaches and Gold Coast to Warwick to Pat's Coaches, Warwick. In 1990 the Brisbane to Roma via Toowoomba services of Pacific West were purchased.

In 1992 the remaining services were sold; Brisbane to Moree and Toowoomba to Tenterfield both to Crisp Coaches, Warwick and Brisbane to Toowoomba, Roma and Charleville to McCafferty's Coaches.

== Fleet ==
Skennars operated a fleet primarily of Denning and GBW bodied International coaches. Fleet livery was blue with yellow signwriting.
