= Adelaide Central bus station =

Bus station in Adelaide, South Australia

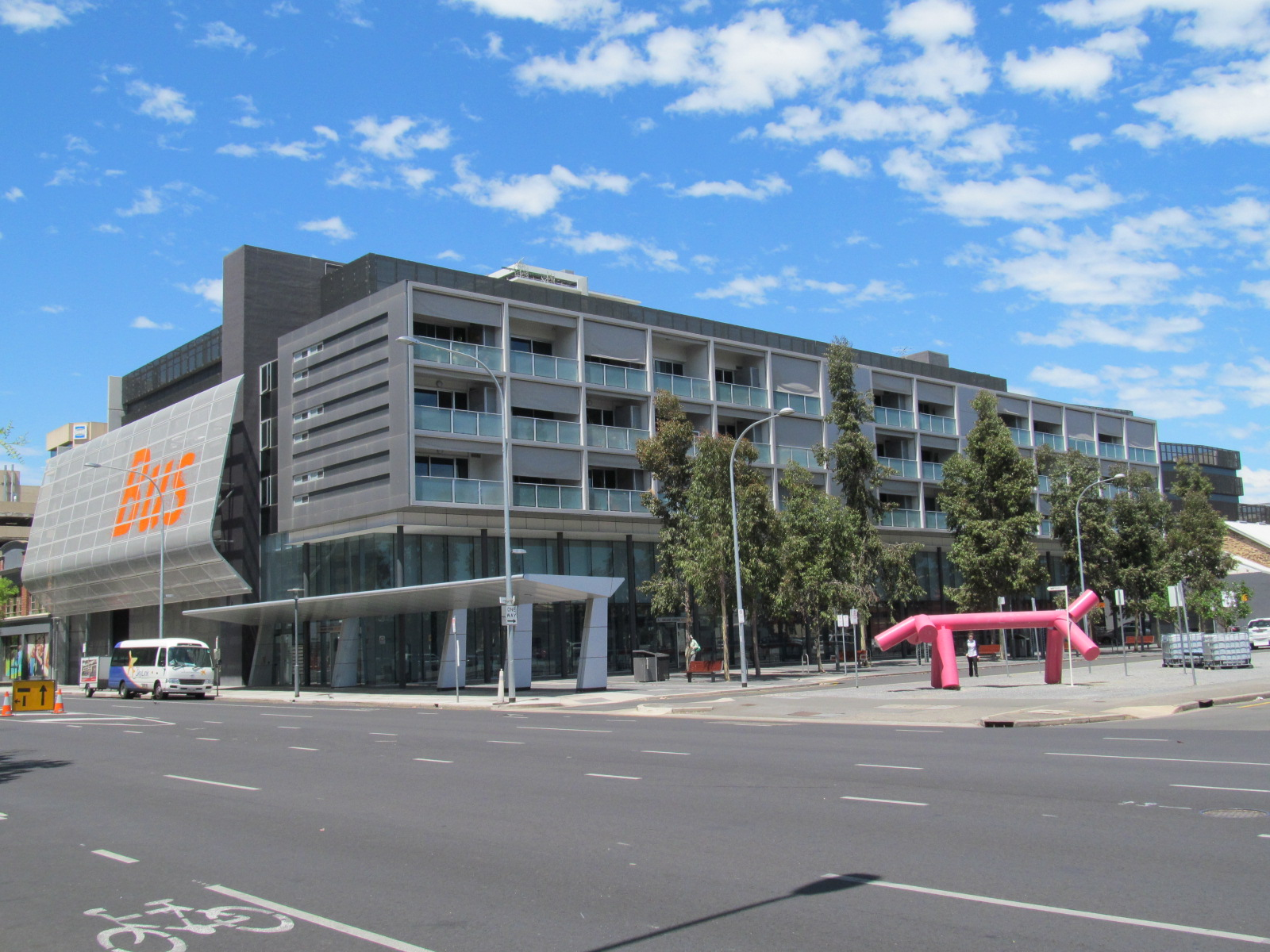
- View from Franklin Street in November 2012

General information
- Location: Franklin Street, Adelaide; Australia
- Owner: Adelaide City Council
- Operator: Kelsian Group
- Bus stands: 15
- Connections: Regional Bus

Other information
- Website: www.cityofadelaide.com.au

History
- Opened: September 1969
- Rebuilt: December 2007

Adelaide Central bus station is Adelaide's main bus station for intercity coach services. It is located on Franklin Street.

== History ==
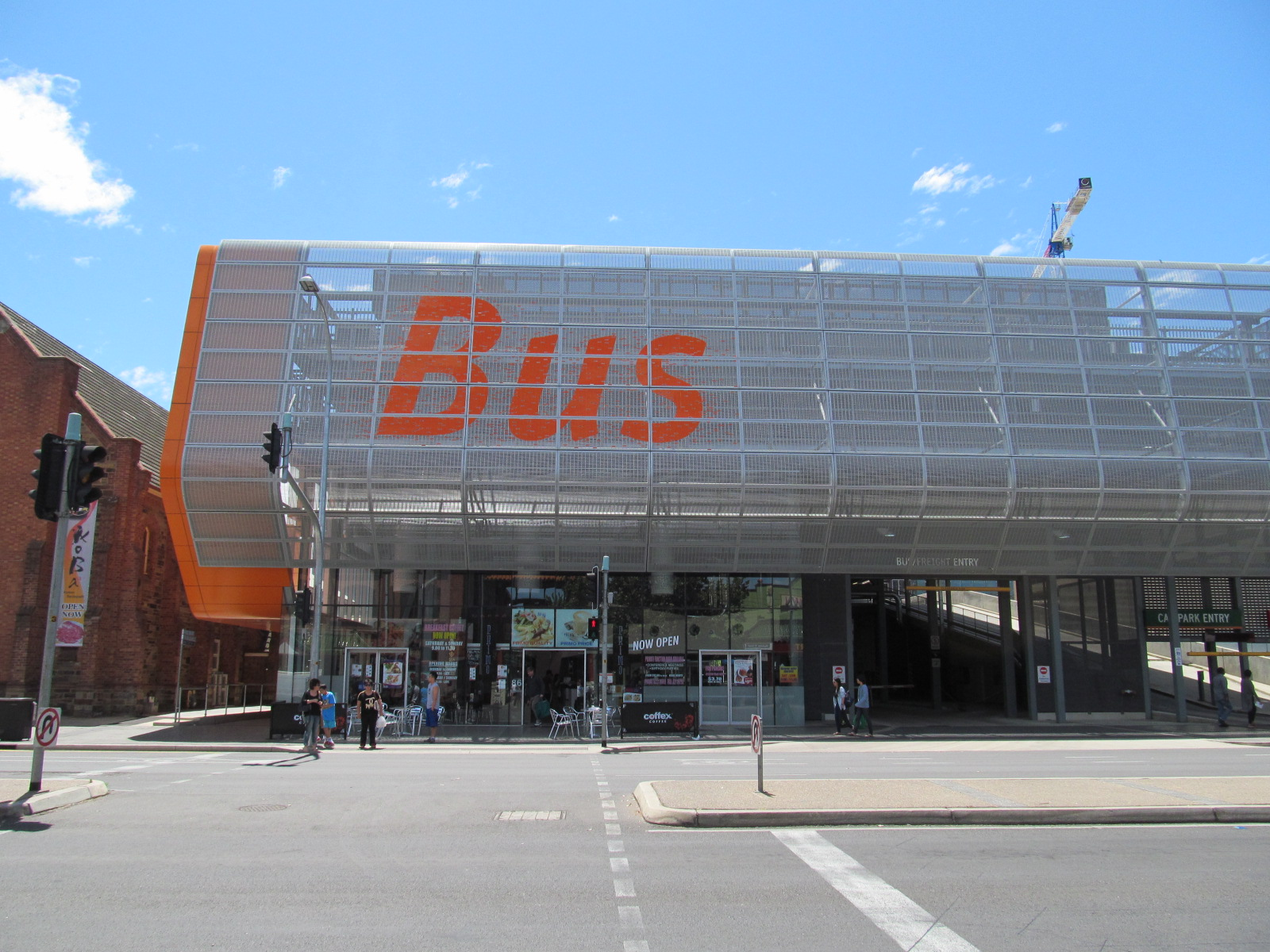
View from Grote Street in November 2012

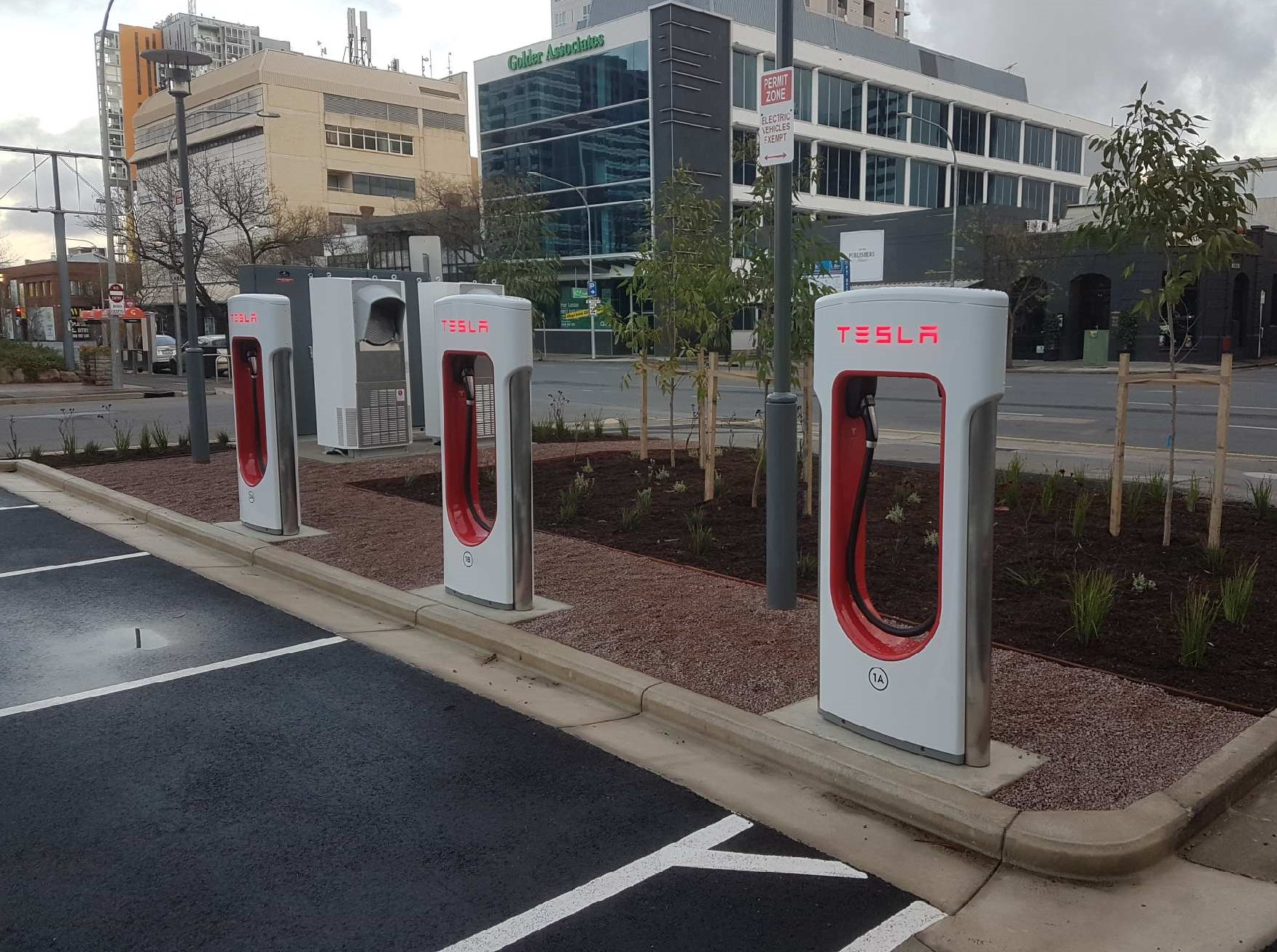
Tesla Supercharger

Terminal 1 of the Adelaide Central bus station was opened in September 1969 on the corner of Franklin and Bowen Streets. It was built by Adelaide City Council in conjunction with Pioneer Tours and a consortium of nine near-country operators.

In October 1971, Terminal 2 opened for use by 16 operators including Greyhound, Premier Roadlines and Stateliner.

Over the years there were various proposals to rebuild the bus station, including relocating it to Adelaide Parklands Terminal. In 2004, Adelaide City Council released a plan to redevelop the coach station. A new station with 39 apartments and a carpark above designed by Denton Corker Marshall opened in December 2007 to the west of the original structure, with the SeaLink Travel Group appointed to manage the station.

Part of the former terminal has been occupied by The Joinery, a Conservation Council of South Australia community environment space.

The former station is to be redeveloped by Renewal SA into a mixed use community with a market and affordable apartment housing, with an arts and media hub, retail and public spaces. A new building that will house the ABC, Country Arts SA, the State Theatre Company South Australia and State Opera South Australia is scheduled to be completed on the site of the original bus station by 2031.

== Operators ==
Adelaide Central bus station is served by:

- Adelaide Sightseeing
- BusBiz
- Firefly Express
- Greyhound Australia
- Kanga Coachlines
- LinkSA
- NSW TrainLink
- Stateliner
- Tambray Coaches
- V/Line
- Yorke Peninsula Coaches

Adelaide Metro buses also stable at the bus station, however, no services operate directly from the station. Passengers can connect to Adelaide Metro services on Grote Street.

== Tesla Supercharger ==
In 2017, a Tesla Supercharger was installed on part of the site.
