= Fantastic Aussie Tours =

- Parent: Jason Cronshaw
- Commenced operation: 1974
- Headquarters: Katoomba
- Service area: Blue Mountains
- Service type: Bus & coach operator
- Depots: 1
- Fleet: 19 (September 2026)
- Website: www.fantastic-aussie-tours.com.au

Fantastic Aussie Tours is an Australian bus company in the Blue Mountains.

== History ==
In 1974, John Cronshaw purchased Katoomba Scenic Tours and rebranded it Golden West Tours. In the 1980s, an alliance was formed with Bus Australia with the business renamed Fantastic Aussie Tours and the Bus Australia livery adopted.

On 11 February 1990, Fantastic Aussie Tours commenced operating a service between Sydney and Armidale commenced under contract to CountryLink as a replacement for the Northern Tablelands Express with Denning Denair coaches in a joint venture with Manly Bus Service.

In 1992, Fantastic Aussie Tours commenced operating a double-deck service. In July 2010, it began operating a City Sightseeing franchise. It was initially operated by Leyland Atlanteans and later by former Lothian Buses Alexander Volvo Olympians.

== Fleet ==
As of September 2026, the fleet consisted of 19 buses and coaches.
