= Deluxe Coachlines =

- Parent: Geoff McIntyre; Len Roden
- Founded: December 1979
- Ceased operation: November 1990
- Headquarters: Wangaratta
- Service area: All Mainland Australian states & territories
- Service type: Long distance coach services
- Fleet: 193 (September 1990)

Deluxe Coachlines was an Australian interstate coach operator that operated from 1979 until 1990.

== History ==
Deluxe Coachlines was founded in May 1979 by Sydney based travel agent Len Roden. With a Denning coach hired from Hoys Roadlines of Wangaratta, Roden began operating a weekly service from Sydney to Perth via Melbourne and Adelaide. By October 1979, the service had expanded to twice weekly with a Custom Coaches bodied RFW and two Domino Tourmaster coaches added. Deluxe established its own maintenance facility in Wangaratta in 1981.

It expanded into all other mainland states and territories and became a national operator with the introduction of an Adelaide to Alice Springs service in 1985.

It gradually expanded and by 1988 was Australia's largest coach operator with a 50% market share operating across the country with nearly 200 coaches. A drop off in demand after Expo 88 as well as the arrival of deregulated discount airlines, brought about the demise of the company. Deluxe was placed in administration in August 1990 by the ANZ Bank with Coopers & Lybrand appointed as administrator.

Operations briefly resumed between Adelaide, Darwin and Perth in November 1990 before Deluxe ceased for good.

== Fleet ==
Deluxe built up a large fleet of Domino Tourmaster and Austral Tourmaster coaches. It later purchased coaches from Denning, MotorCoach Australia and Setra. Deluxe adopted a white with two shades of blue livery that was a familiar sight on Australia's road for many years after its demise courtesy of the number of operators who elected not to repaint former Deluxe coaches they purchased. It also used sub-contractors, with Western Road Liners having seven vehicles painted in Deluxe livery.

== Legacy ==
The Deluxe Coachlines name was revived in the 2000s by a Melbourne coach operator.
