= Manly Coaches =

Australian bus charter company

- Parent: Geoff Harper
- Ceased operation: September 2016
- Headquarters: Brookvale
- Service area: Sydney
- Service type: Bus charter operator
- Depots: 1
- Fleet: 14 (September 2016)
- Website: www.manlycoach.com.au

Manly Coaches was an Australian bus charter company in Sydney, Australia.

== History ==
On 30 October 1978, Chris Brownlee, trading as Manly Transport Service, purchased route 135 Manly wharf – Manly Hospital – North Head from Neil Smith with four buses. On 1 July 1989, the business of Cremorne Bus Service with route 224 Cremorne Point wharf – Cremorne Junction – Chowder Bay was purchased from Eddie Hayman with seven buses.

On 11 February 1990, Manly commenced operating a service between Sydney and Armidale commenced under contract to CountryLink as a replacement for the Northern Tablelands Express with Denning Denair coaches in a joint venture with Fantastic Aussie Tours.

In 1992, Manly took over the Great Sights day tour operation from Newmans Coach Lines. On 23 June 1994, the Great Sights tourist operation was sold to the Driver Group Manly vehicles continued to operate the Great Sights tour program until 12 September 1994, when Clipper Tours took over. An association with Fantastic Aussie Tours saw some vehicles painted in the Fantastic Aussie Tours livery of red and blue which was derived from that of Bus Australia, which became the basis for the Manly Coaches colour scheme in the 1990s.

The trading name Manly Coaches was adopted for the charter operation in 1997, replacing the previous trading names of Manly Bus Service and Manly Coach Tours. Route 224 was taken over by Sydney Buses on 3 July 1995, followed by route 135 on 19 July 1998 with Manly continuing to trade as a charter operator.

On 9 June 2003, Chris Brownlee sold the business to Geoff Harper. In September 2016, the business was sold to Forest Coach Lines with no vehicles.

== Fleet ==
When operations ceased in September 2016, the fleet consisted of 14 ex Sydney Buses Mercedes-Benz O305 buses.
