= Jack McCafferty =

Australian politician

John Francis (Jack) McCafferty
- Born: 11 March 1914; Brisbane, Queensland, Australia
- Died: 12 January 1999 (aged 84)
- Spouse: Lorna McCafferty
- Children: Six

John Francis McCafferty (1914-1999) was one of the pioneers of the bus and coach industry in Australia, founder of McCafferty's Coaches and mayor of Toowoomba for 9 years.

McCafferty was born at Breakfast Creek, Brisbane on 11 March 1914, the son of James McCafferty, a railway engine driver, and Martha.

During the depression in the 1930s, he operated a milk run with a horse and cart in Wilsonton.

On 1 April 1940, McCafferty began his first bus run, purchasing the Picnic Point to Rangeville service. Later in 1950, he acquired a co-ordinated bus-rail link from Toowoomba to Brisbane. Over the following years, he acquired further services, building the McCafferty's Coaches business into an Australia-wide coach service. His coach business was later merged into Greyhound Australia.

In 1955, McCafferty was elected as an alderman to the Toowoomba City Council and within three years he was the 58th mayor of Toowoomba, an office he held for nine years until his defeat in 1967. During this time, he came to be regarded as a dynamic mayor who put Toowoomba on the map.

McCafferty died on 12 January 1999 at the age of 84 after a 2-year battle with cancer. His funeral was held at St Patrick's Cathedral and was attended by more than 1,000 people.
