= VDL Futura =

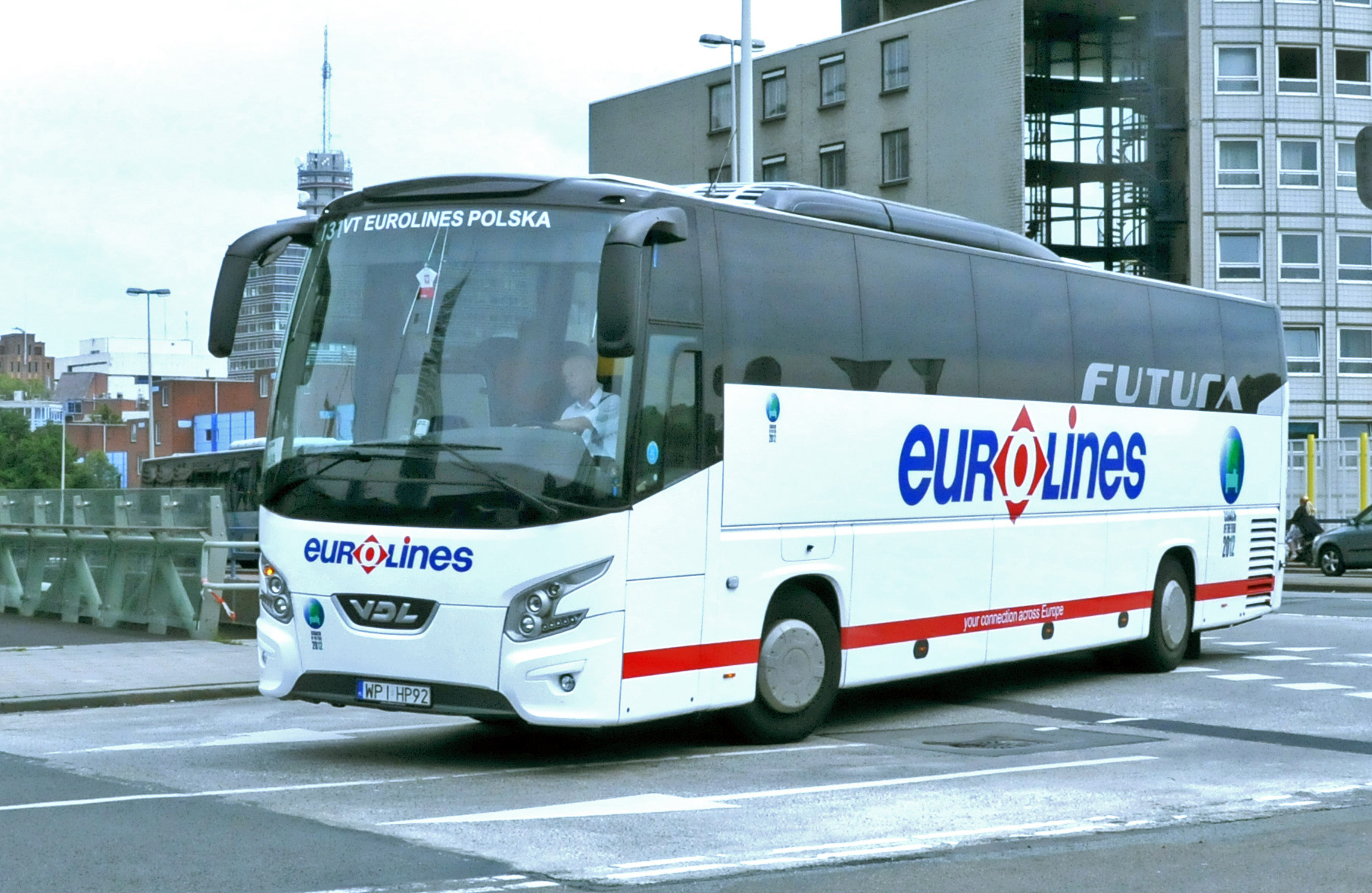
- Eurolines VDL Futura FHD2-129

Overview
- Manufacturer: VDL Bus & Coach, previously VDL Bova, originally Bova
- Production: 1982–present
- Assembly: Netherlands: Valkenswaard

Body and chassis
- Class: Coach
- Doors: 1-2
- Floor type: high floor or double floor

Powertrain
- Engine: DAF MX-11 1,900; DAF MX-11 2,100; DAF MX-11 2,300; DAF MX-13 2,600
- Power output: 270kW, 300kW, 330kW, 390kW
- Transmission: ZF Traxon, ZF intarder3: 12 TX 2011 BO; 12 TX 2411 BO; 12 TX 2811 BO: ZF Ecolife, ZF retarder: 6 AP 2000 B 6 AP 2300 BO; 6 AP 2300 B

Dimensions
- Length: FMD2: 12.88 m - 14,85 m; FHD2: 10.61 m - 14.85 m; FDD2: 13.09 m - 14.15 m
- Width: 2.55 m
- Height: FMD2: 3.50 m; FHD2: 3.70 m; FDD2: 4.00 m
- Curb weight: 19.3 - 27.0 tonnes

Chronology
- Predecessor: Bova Europa; Bova Futura; Bova Magiq; VDL Synergy

The Futura is a range of coaches manufactured by VDL Bus & Coach at Valkenswaard in the Netherlands since 1982. A derivative of the Futura produced from 1999 to 2011 was the Magiq.

The model was manufactured for many years by Bova as the Bova Futura, and after that business was taken over by the VDL Groep as the VDL Bova Futura. In the autumn of 2010 a significantly facelifted version was introduced as the VDL Futura (sometimes referred to as the Futura 2).

== Bova Futura ==
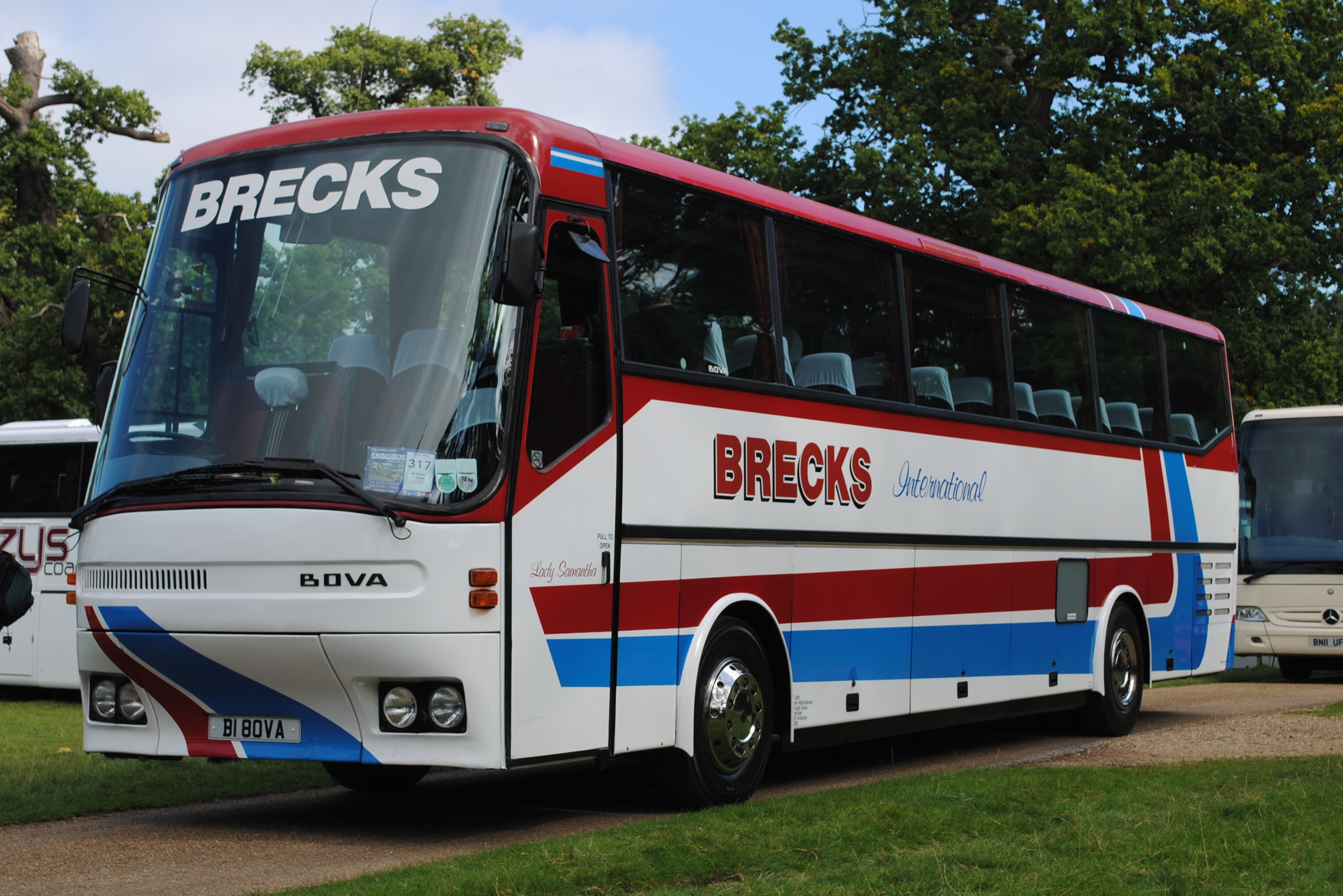
Bova Futura FHD12 (1986)

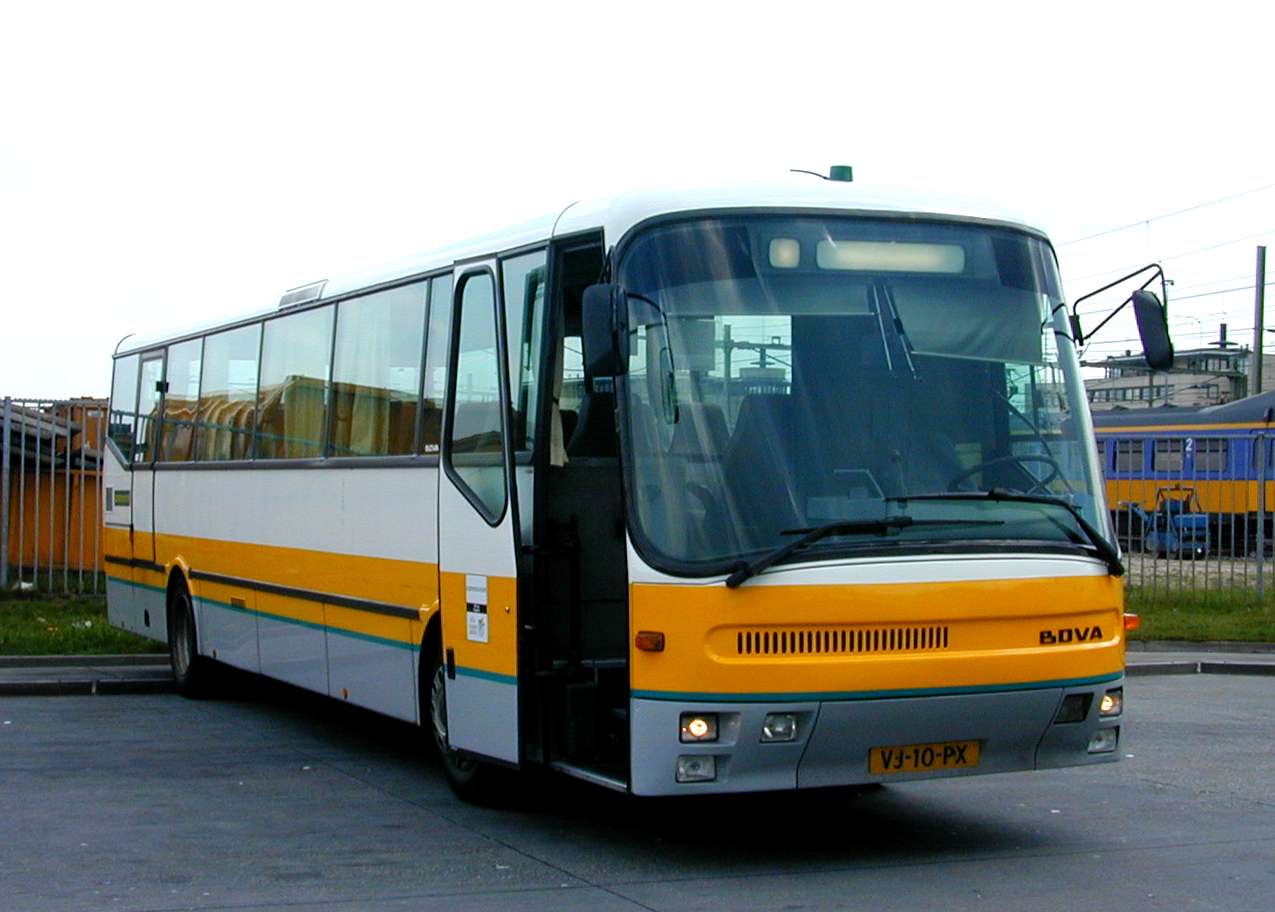
Bova Futura FVD12 (1990)

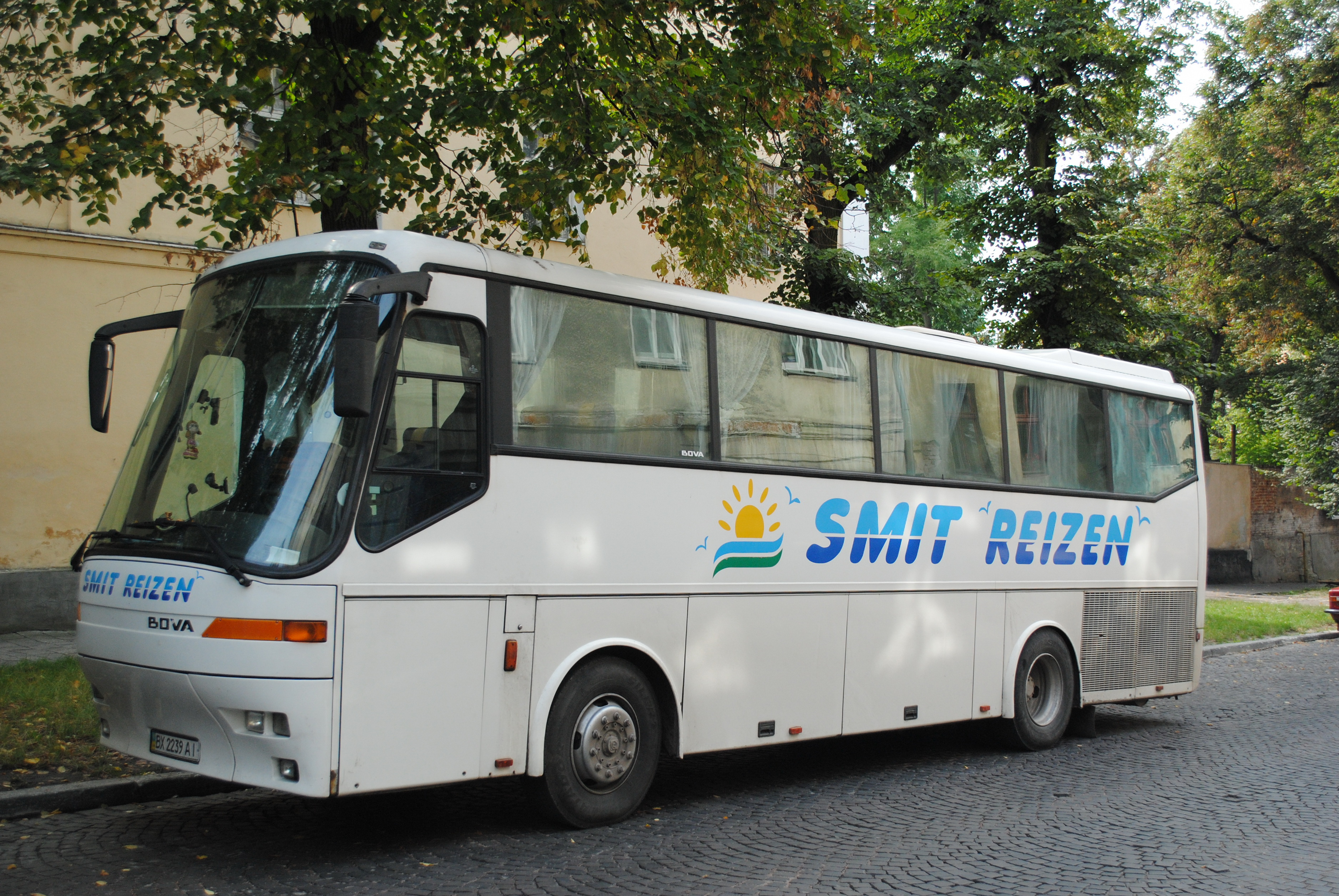
Bova Futura FHD10 (1990–99)

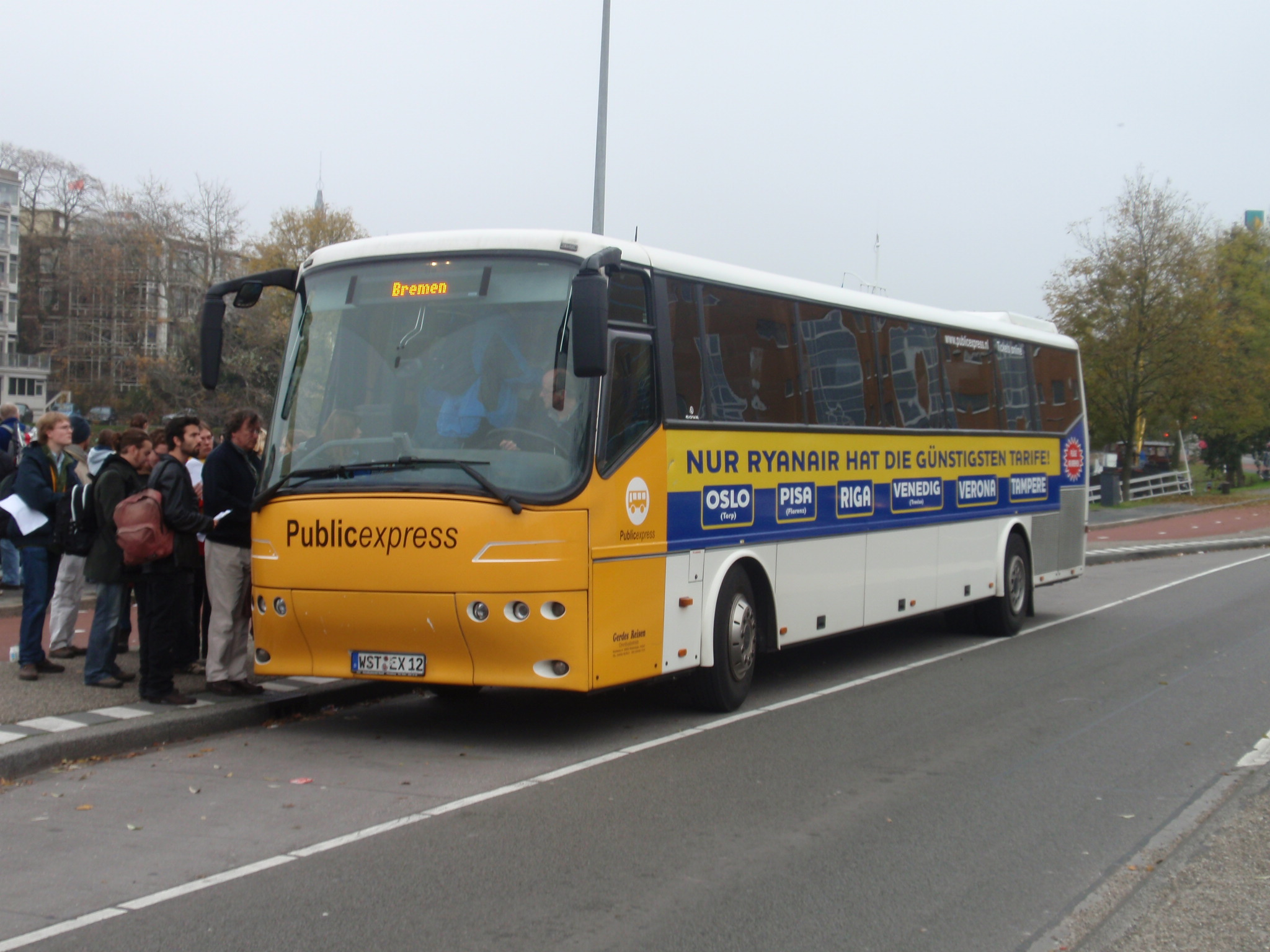
Bova Futura FLD13 (1999-2007)

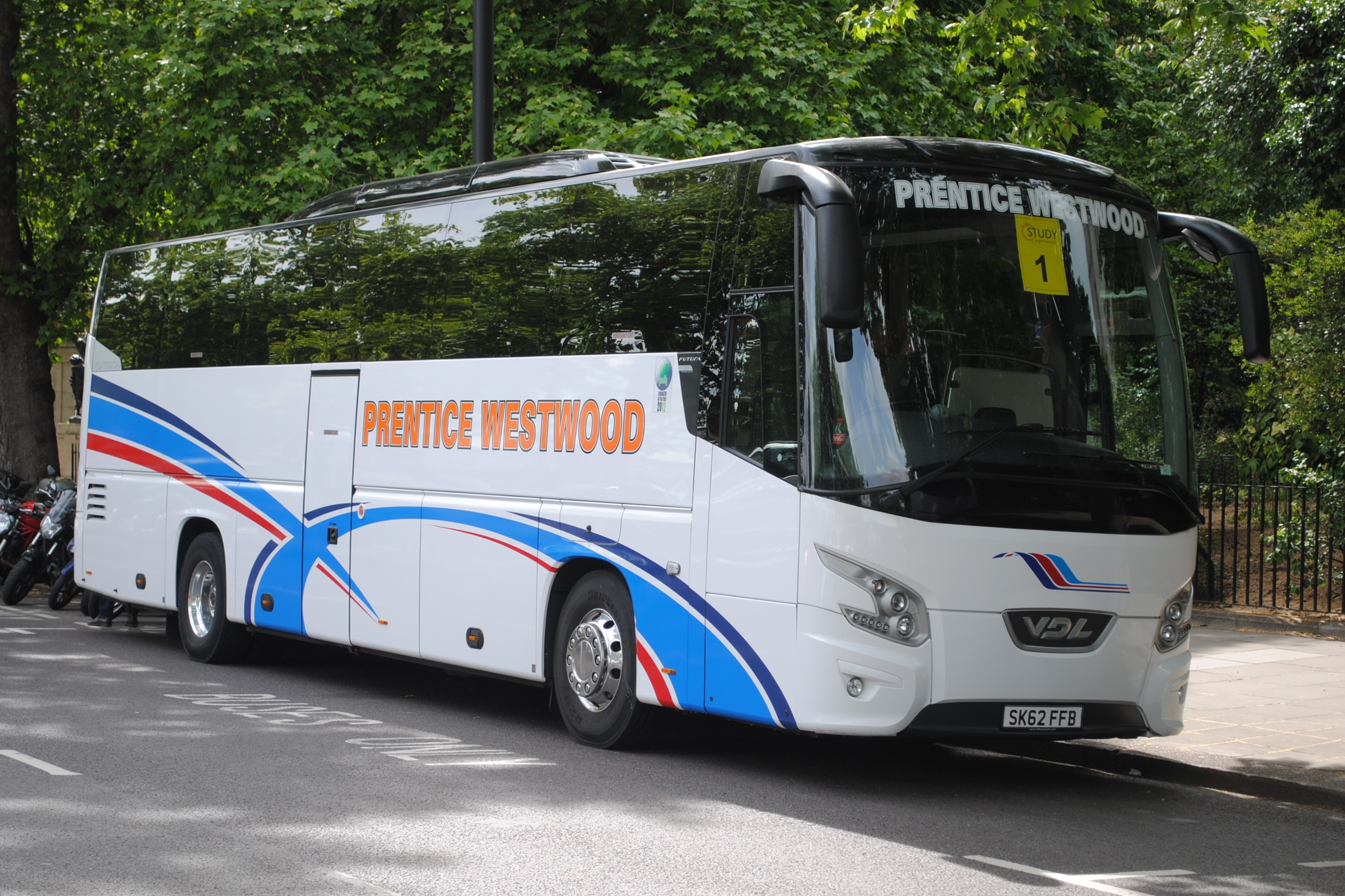
VDL Futura FHD2-122 (2012)

The Futura was introduced in September 1982 by Bova, as successor to the previous Europa model. In contrast to the angular lines of the Europa, the Futura featured a very distinctive convex aerodynamic front which inspired the model's name (futura being Spanish and Italian for "future"). The prominent "bulge" below the windscreen remained a feature of the Futura through successive facelifts until the introduction of the Futura 2 model in 2010. By 1986, exports accounted for two thirds of production.

Bus Australia purchased over 40. Some were imported in CKD form and assembled by JW Bolton in Perth. Four were imported as frames with the bodies completed locally by BHB Engineering.

=== Engines ===
From its introduction the Futura was available with DAF engines as standard, although Mercedes-Benz engines could be specified as an optional alternative. In 1994 Cummins and MAN engines became available as options, however all of the non-DAF engine options were dropped when the Euro 3 emission standards came into effect in 2000. The engine manufacturer is signified by the third letter of the detailed model code - for example a 12m high-floor coach could be coded FHD12 (DAF engine), FHM12 (Mercedes-Benz), FHC12 (Cummins) or FHX12 (MAN).

=== Height and Length Variations ===
Production commenced in 1982 with a 12 metre long coach available in two different heights - the 3.55m high FH12 and the 3.26m high FL12. The high floor versions were always the more numerous types. In 1990 the range was expanded with the introduction of a shorter (10.4m long) version of the high floor coach, the FH10. A third length option for the two-axle Futura coach was added in 1996, this being the 12.7m long FH13/FL13.

An interurban bus/semi-coach version of the Futura was introduced in 1990 as the 12m long/3.08m high FV12, of which 169 were built during the 1990s.

Three-axle coach variants of the Futura were built from 1993 onwards, marketed as the Futura Magnum. The 14.8m long FH15/FL15 were launched at Busworld in Kortrijk, whilst the 13.5m long (high floor only) FH14 was added to the range in 1995. The tri-axle variants of the Bova Futura were discontinued from 2007 following the introduction of tri-axle versions of the Bova Magiq.

Towards the end of the original Bova Futura's production run the type codes were revised to more accurately reflect the length of the vehicle. Thus the FHD/FLD10, 12 and 13 became known as the FHD/FLD104, 120 and 127 respectively.

=== Facelifts ===
The Bova Futura was subject to several facelifts over the years, with the style of headlights providing the most immediately recognisable visual difference between vehicles of different phases. However identifying the age of individual vehicles by this method is now complicated as many older coaches have retrospectively been fitted with newer style front panels to modernise their appearance or repair accident damage.

- 1982 - large circular quad headlamps, with each pair located in a rectangular recess near the bottom corners of the coach front.
- 1988 - small rectangular quad headlamps in individual recesses positioned very slightly higher up the coach front, with similar fog lamps in the corners below.
- 1999 - small circular quad headlights with smaller circular indicators/turn signals alongside, all in individual recesses and positioned higher up the coach front than both earlier versions. Small circular fog lamps in lower corners.
- 2007 - as above but with the headlights and turn signals moved closer together and grouped together in a single irregularly-shaped recess on each side. This version also has a slightly less bulbous frontal profile.

After the introduction of the VDL Futura 2 in 2010, the final version of the Bova Futura remained available for a time as a cheaper alternative marketed as the VDL Futura Classic.

== Bova Magiq ==
From 1999 Bova offered the differently-styled Bova Magiq as a flagship model, which sold in more modest quantities than the Futura. Differences from the Futura included a flatter front profile, but a more curvaceous rear. Initially the Magiq was available as a two-axle coach (models XHD120 and XHD122), but from 2006 the model code changed to MHD and tri-axle MHD131, MHD139 and MHD148 variants were introduced as replacements for the Futura Magnum. The Magiq was facelifted for the 2007 model year, changes to the headlamps mirroring those of the contemporary Futura (although the headlamp clusters on the Magiq were positioned significantly higher on the body than those of the Futura). The Magiq was discontinued after the introduction of the VDL Futura 2. Top speed is 125kmh. Tested in China. 375 hp engine.

== VDL Futura 2 ==
An extensively restyled Futura was launched by VDL Bus & Coach on 7 September 2010. The new model was henceforth marketed exclusively as a VDL, with the "Bova" name being discontinued. Also discontinued was the distinctive convex bulge on the front of the coach, as the new Futura 2 has a more upright frontal profile which owes more to the styling of the Magiq than to that of the previous Futura. The revised Futura was named International Coach of the Year 2012 on 29 August 2011.

The single-deck VDL Futura is available in two heights, 3.5m (FMD2 variants) and 3.7m (FHD2 variants). Six length options are available for the FHD2 - 10.6m, 12.2m, 12.9m or 13.5m on two axles, and 13.9m or 14.8m on three-axles, whilst the lower FMD2 is only available in 12.9m, 13.5m and 14.8m lengths. Detailed model codes include the length of the vehicle, thus FHD2-122 denotes a 12.2m high-floor Futura 2.

In 2015 the Futura range was extended to include the VDL Futura FDD2, a double-deck coach to replace the VDL Synergy. This is available in two lengths, 13m (FDD2-130) and 14.1m (FDD2-141).

== VDL Futura 3 ==
The third generation Futura was presented in late 2025 at Busworld Europe.

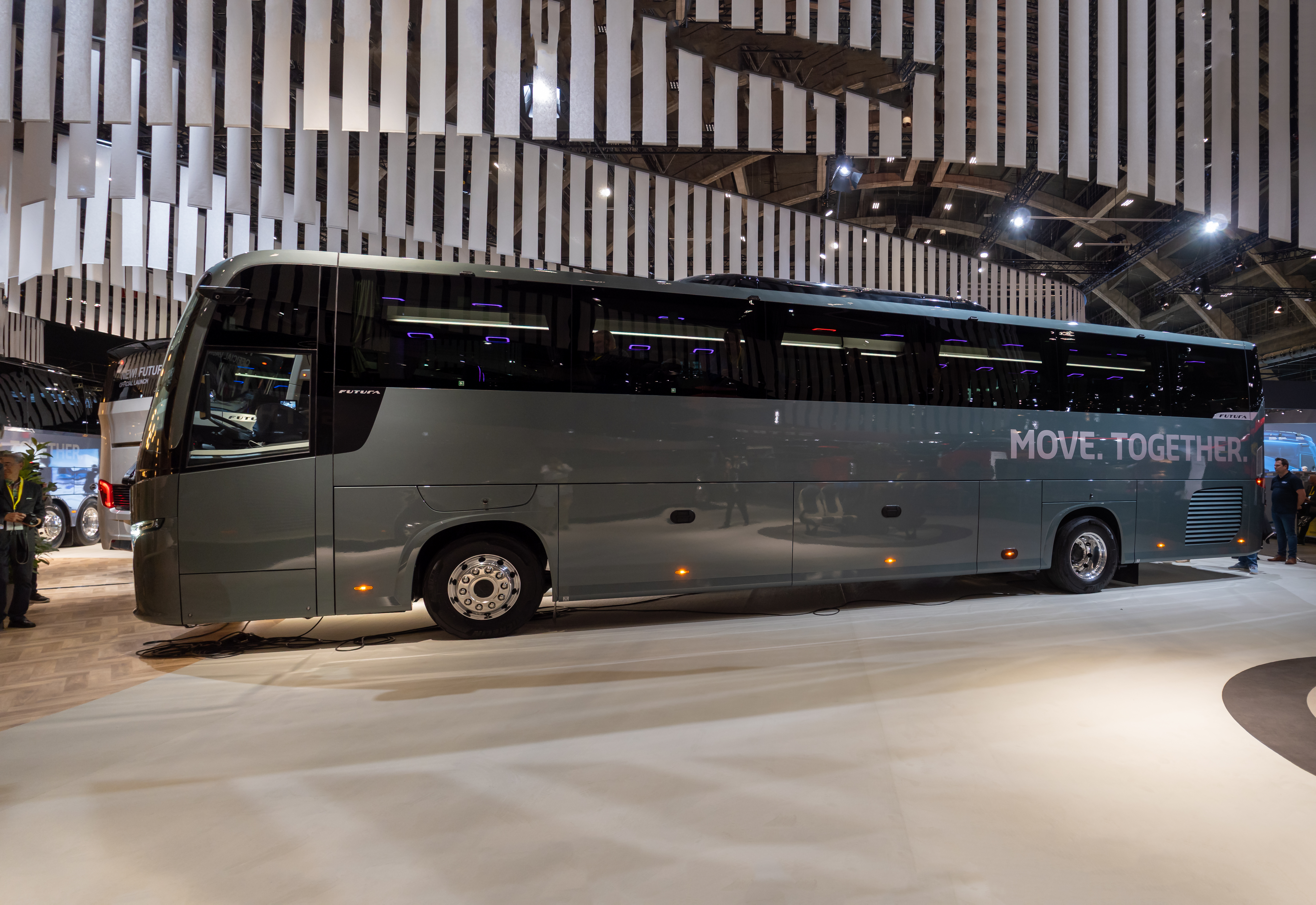

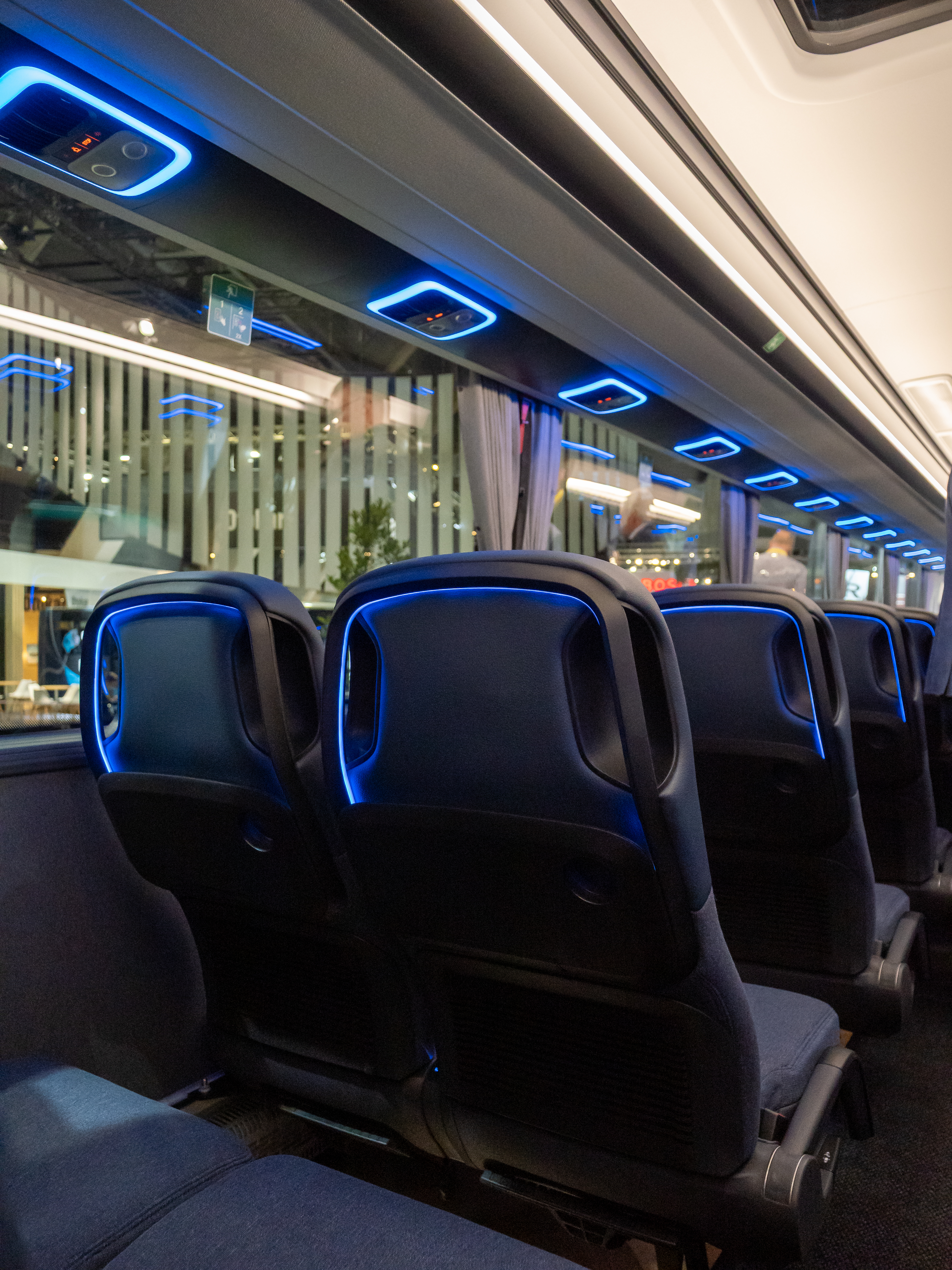

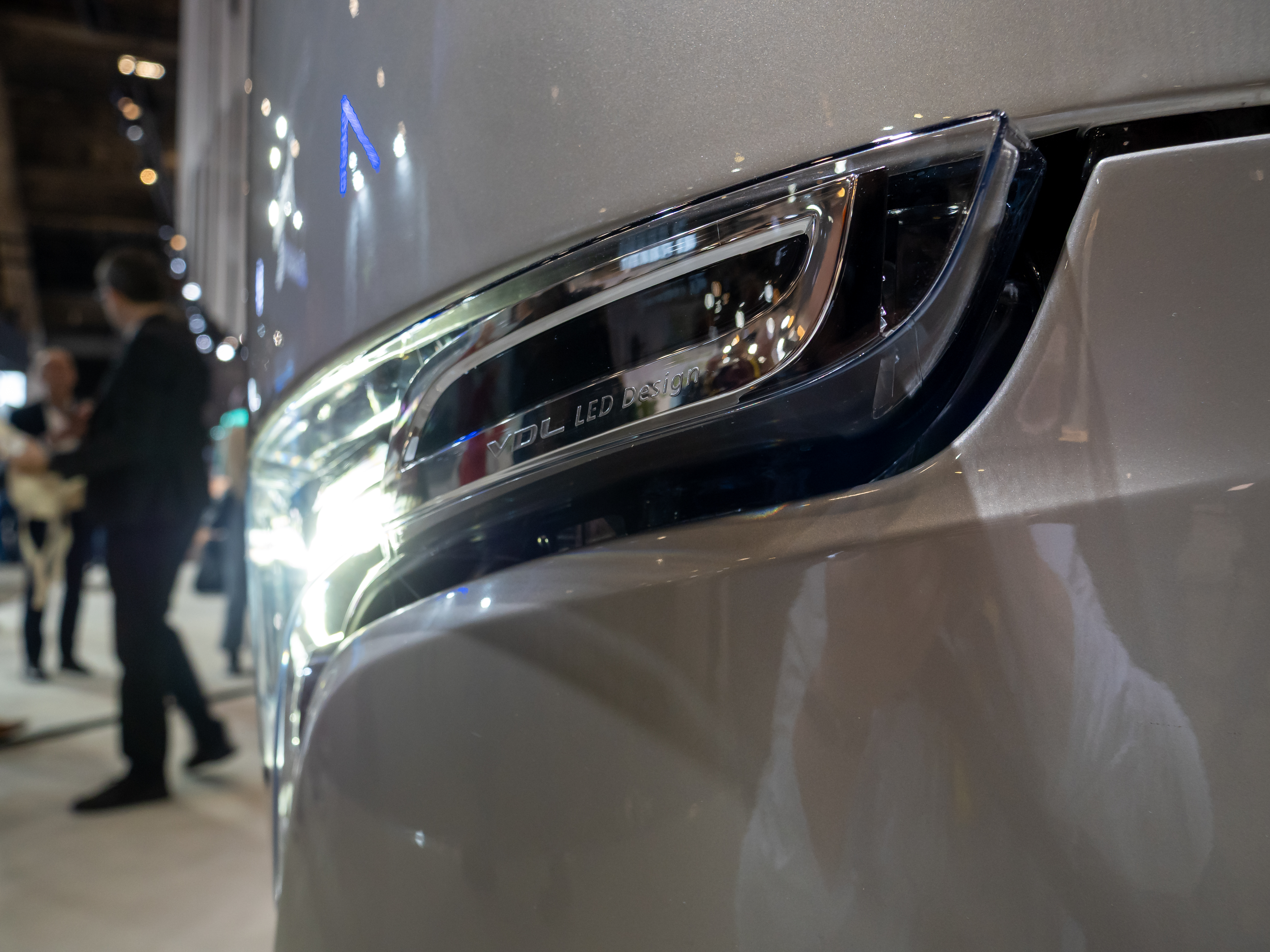

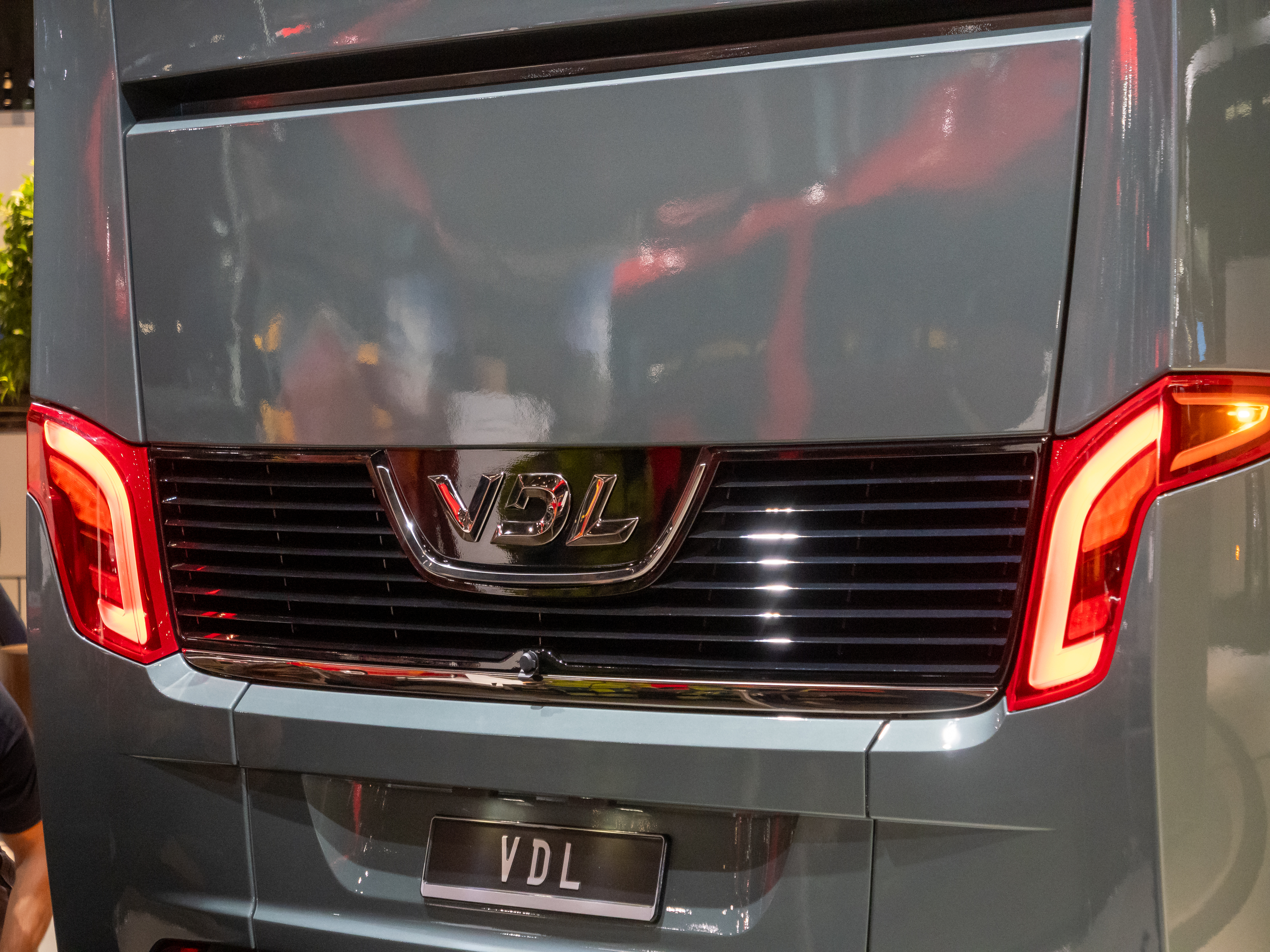

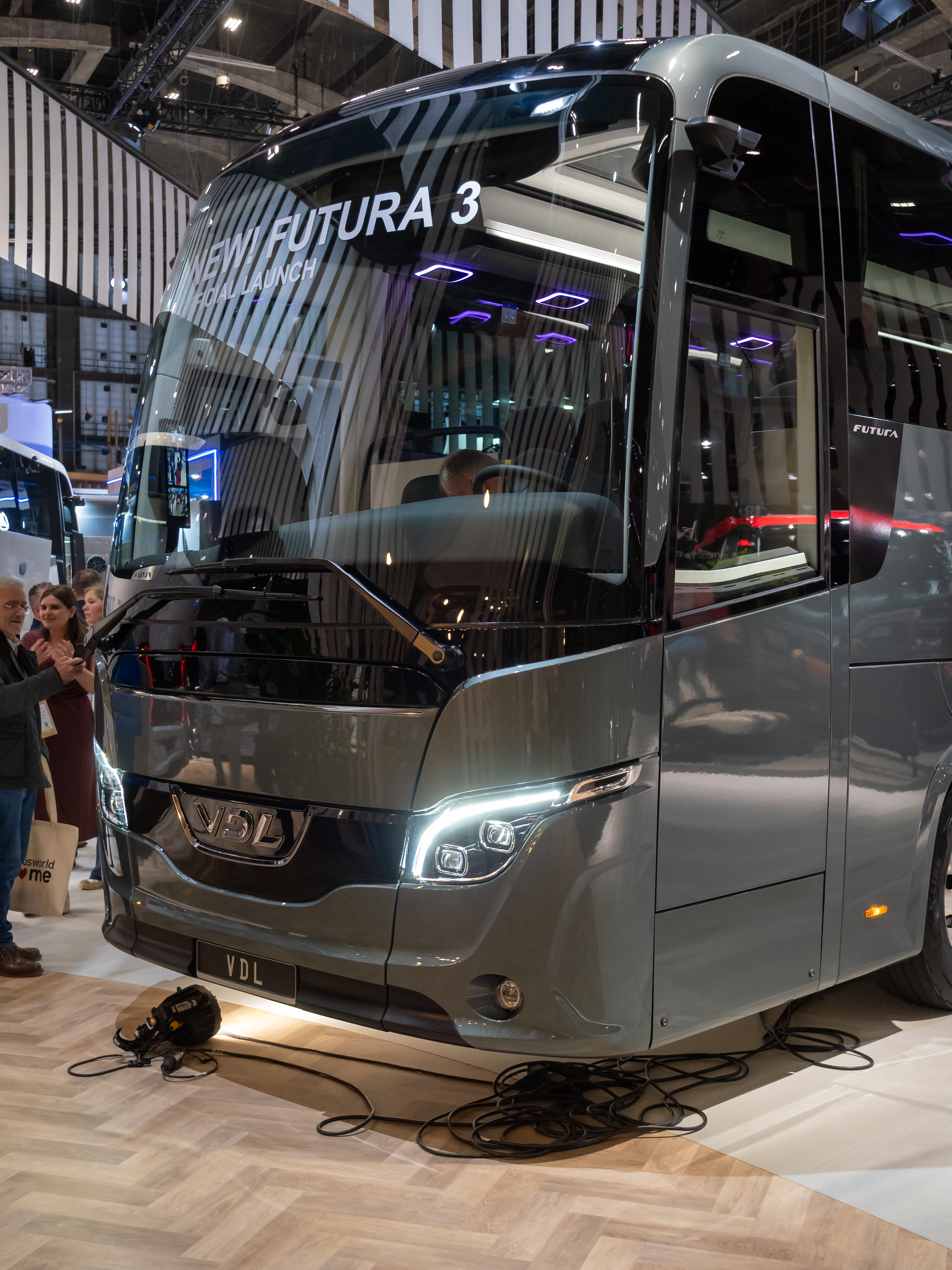
