= Newmans Coach Lines =

- Commenced operation: 1987
- Ceased operation: 1993
- Headquarters: Arncliffe
- Service area: Sydney; Cairns
- Service type: Coach charter operator
- Depots: 2
- Fleet: 21 (February 1993)

Newmans Coach Lines was an Australian coach charter company with operations in Sydney and Cairns.

== History ==
In 1987, the Sydney coach operations of Chester Coaches were purchased by New Zealand-based Newmans Coach Lines. Newmans also purchased the Cairns business of Carah Coaches.

In late 1989, Newmans commenced operating services from Sydney to Melbourne and Brisbane under the Scenic Intercapital brand. Rather than operating as express services like other coach operators, the services operated with overnight stops in Albury and Coffs Harbour. These ceased in 1990.

In 1990, Newmans commenced operating coaches for Contiki Tours following the demise of Deluxe Coachlines. In 1992, the inbound tour business was sold to Australian Pacific Tours and the Great Sights business to Manly Bus Service. Newmans ceased trading in February 1993.

== Fleet ==
When operations ceased, the fleet consisted of 21 coaches.

== Depots ==
Newmans was initially based in Chester Hill. In July 1988, it relocated to Arncliffe.
