= McCafferty's =

McCafferty Coaches
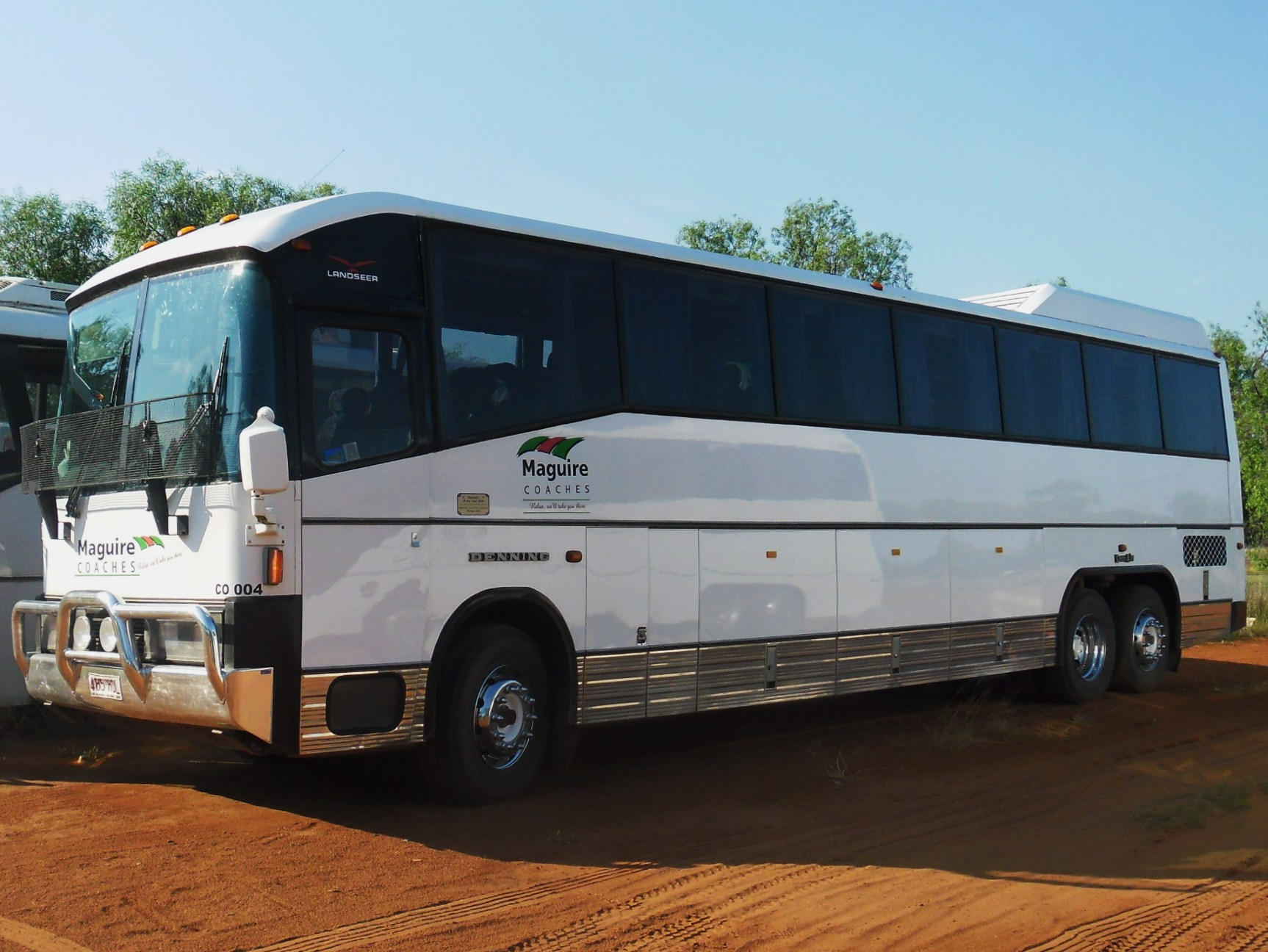
- Over 60 Denning Landseers were purchased in the 1980s and 1990s
- Parent: Jack McCafferty
- Founded: April 1940
- Ceased operation: October 2004
- Headquarters: Toowoomba
- Service area: Australia
- Service type: Coach services
- Fleet: 129 (January 2004)

McCafferty's Coaches was an Australian family run interstate coach operator from 1940 to 2004. In October 2004 the McCafferty family sold its shares and its operations were rebranded as part of Greyhound Australia

== History ==
McCafferty's Coaches was formed in April 1940 when Jack McCafferty began a service from Picnic Point to Rangeville in Toowoomba. In 1955 McCafferty's began operating a service from Toowoomba to the Gold Coast. Over the next few decades McCafferty's expanded to operate long-distance services throughout Queensland.

In December 1980 McCafferty's entered the interstate coach market with a Brisbane to Sydney service extending to Melbourne in December 1983. On 22 December 1989, one of its coaches was involved in the Kempsey bus crash in which 35 people were killed.

In November 1992 McCafferty's commenced operating Melbourne to Adelaide and Adelaide to Darwin services followed by Sydney - Canberra - Adelaide in late 1993 and Darwin - Broome - Perth in May 1995 making it a national operator. The latter service was withdrawn in June 1996.

The Brisbane to Charleville service was acquired from Skennars in 1992. In 1999 McCafferty's purchased MotorCoach Australia from the administrator of Clifford Corporation. As well as building coaches for McCafferty's it also completed orders for external customers. It closed in 2004 having completed over 60 coaches.

In March 2000 McCafferty's entered into negotiations with Greyhound Pioneer Australia about a possible merge. In September 2000 a takeover bid from McCafferty's for Greyhound was accepted. As part of the deal the McCafferty family sold their shares to Tony McCafferty. In October 2004 the McCafferty family sold its shares to the ANZ Bank and George Chapman, and both operations were rebranded as Greyhound Australia.

== Fleet ==
From the late 1960s, McCafferty's purchased exclusively new Denning coaches. In the first half of the 1990s, 40 second-hand Denning Landseers from a variety operators were purchased for its interstate expansion. From 1994 it began purchasing MotorCoach Australia coaches.

In the 1970s McCafferty's coaches were painted in a white with blue and black, then into the early 1980s, a magenta and blue livery appeared. In 1987 a silver, grey, blue and red livery was introduced followed by a two-tone gold and blue livery, originally intended as a special livery to mark the company's 50th anniversary in 1990, but adopted as standard. The final livery was a sand-like "Platinum" with blue colour scheme to celebrate the company's 60th anniversary.
