= Brisbane Transit Centre =

Former bus station in Brisbane, Queensland

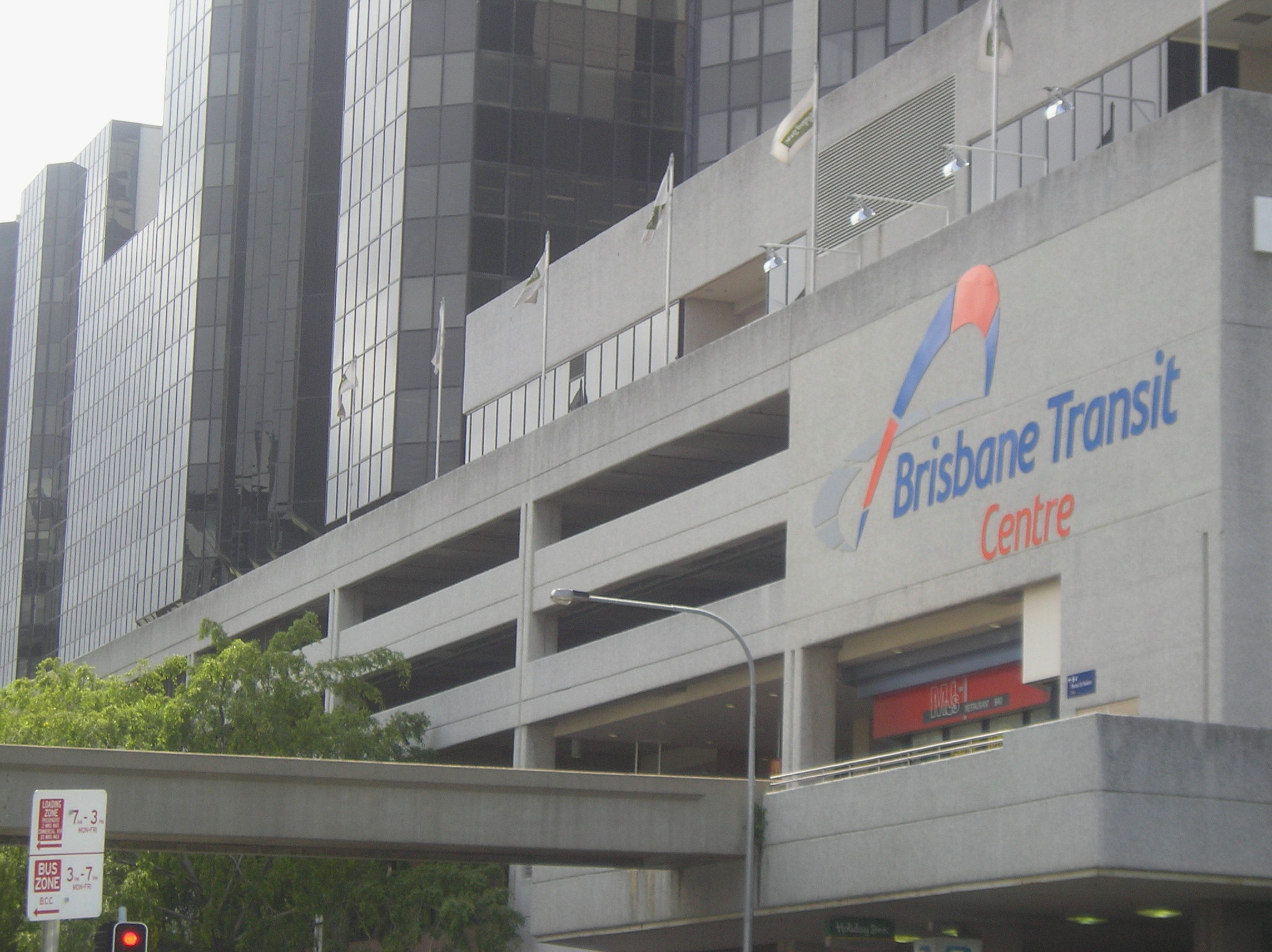

General information
- Coordinates: 27.4661°S 153.0186°E
- Opened: 1986
- Closed: 2019
- Demolished: 2020
- Owner: Australian Prime Property Fund

Technical details
- Floor count: 20
- Floor area: 29,621 metres^{2}

Website
- http://crossriverrail.qld.gov.au/brisbane-transit-centre/

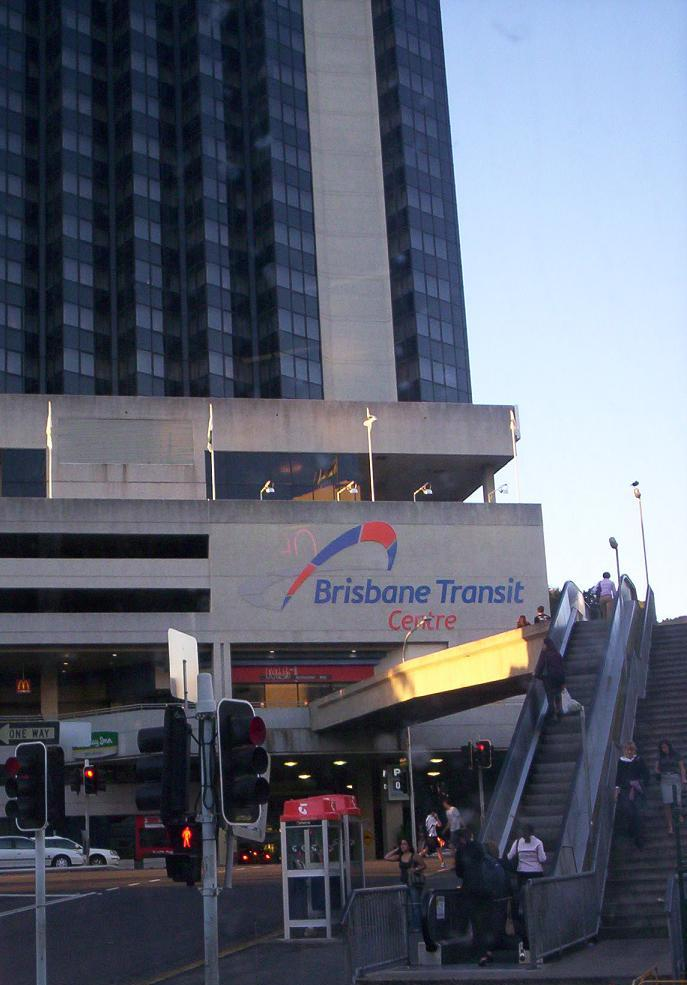
Access from George Street

The Brisbane Transit Centre, at 151–171 Roma Street, Brisbane, Queensland, Australia, was a long-distance bus station. It was closed and demolished in 2020 along with its three office towers. It was widely regarded as the ugliest building in Brisbane.

== History ==
Opened in 1986, the Brisbane Transit Centre was between the Queensland Police Service headquarters and the Roma Street Parkland. The complex included a number of shops, cafes and restaurants, and two office towers. It also included the Travelodge Hotel which was positioned above the station, which opened in 1986. Access to the centre was from the ground floor on Roma Street or from the Roma Street Parkland. In March 2016, GPT sold its half share in the property to co-owner the Australian Prime Property Fund.

== Long distance coach travel ==
The coach terminal was located on the top floor of the Brisbane Transit Centre and used by:

- Crisps Coaches to Tenterfield and Moree
- Greyhound Australia intrastate within Queensland and interstate services to Byron Bay and Sydney
- Murrays to Toowoomba and Chinchilla
- NSW TrainLink to Casino, connecting with train services to Sydney
- Premier Motor Service to Cairns, Lismore and Sydney
- Bus Queensland to Mount Isa and Charleville

== Train travel ==
Roma Street railway station was accessed from the ground floor level of the Brisbane Transit Centre. Long distance Traveltrain services depart for destinations within Queensland. NSW TrainLink operate an XPT service to Sydney. It is also part of the Queensland Rail City network.

== Translink buses ==
Roma Street busway station is served by Transport for Brisbane buses.

== Demolition ==
The Cross River Rail Authority demolished the whole of the Brisbane Transit Centre including the East and West Tower and Hotel Jen from March 2018 to make way for Cross River Rail platforms at Roma Street. The Brisbane Coach Terminal opened to the north of Roma Street station as a replacement.
