= Stateliner =

Australian bus company

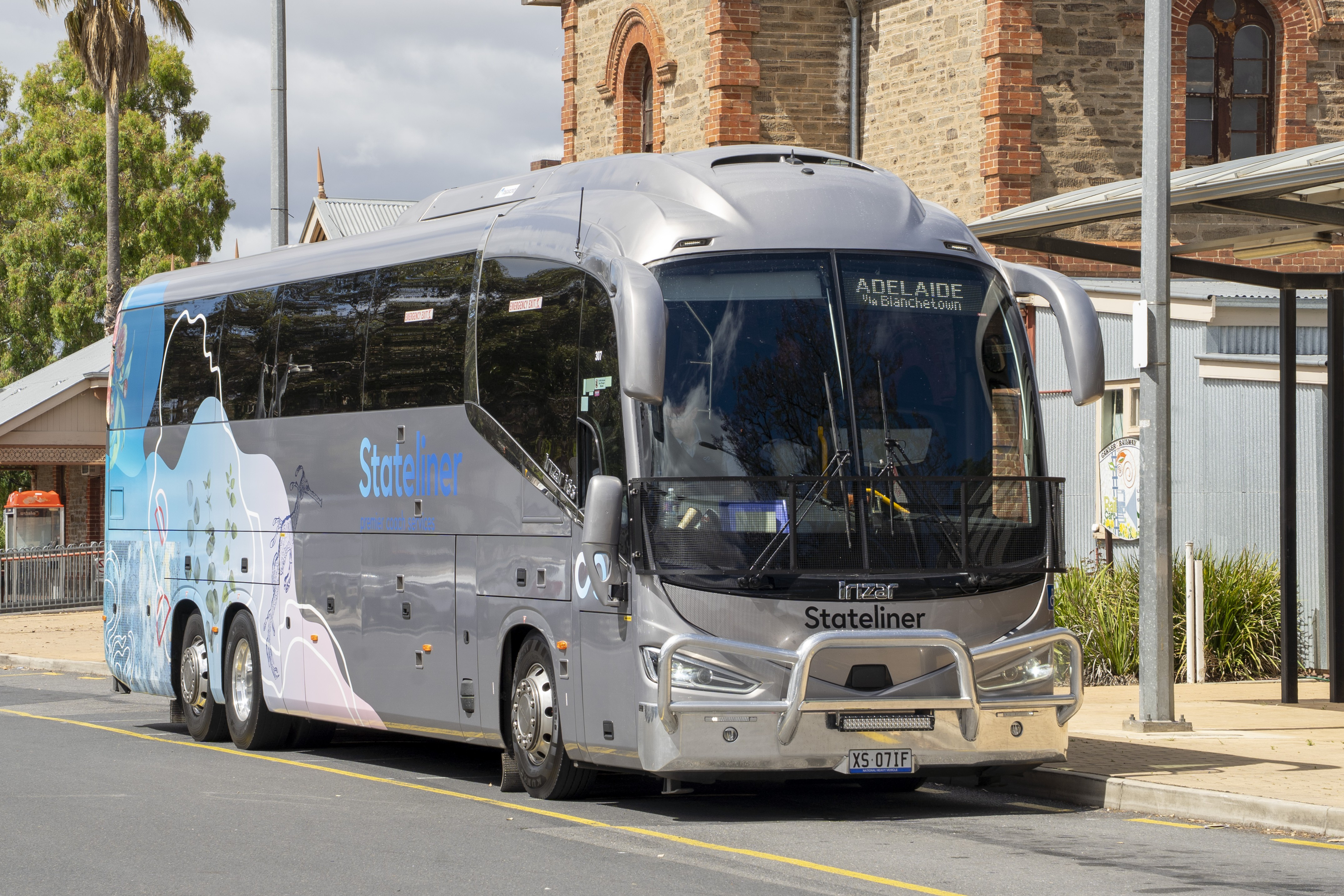
- Irizar bodied Scania K410IB at Gawler railway station in November 2025
- Parent: Crawford family
- Founded: 1966
- Headquarters: Mile End
- Service area: South Australia
- Service type: Coach services
- Hubs: Adelaide Central bus station
- Fleet: 29 (August 2025)
- Website: www.stateliner.com.au

Stateliner is South Australia's largest long-distance coach operator, running services from Adelaide across the state.

== History ==
In 1974 Stateliner was operating services from Adelaide to Ceduna, Streaky Bay, Port Lincoln, Port Lincoln, Broken Hill and Whyalla with a fleet of 22 vehicles out of a depot in Mile End.

In March 1976, Stateliner began operating services to Perth and Sydney under the Greyhound brand under a franchise agreement, taking over from Greyhound's Murray Valley Coaches. Pendle's Riverland Coaches that operated services from Adelaide to Renmark was purchased in 1976.

In April 1977 Mount Barker Passenger Service was purchased followed by Bull's Tourist Services that operated services from Adelaide to Alice Springs a month later. In December 1977 the Mount Barker service was sold to Briscoes. In 1979 the services from Adelaide to the Barossa Valley, Truro, Morgan, Kapunda and Renmark were sold to Premier Roadliners.

In 1980, Premier Roadliners' principal shareholder Alan Crawford purchased a substantial shareholding in Stateliner with the combined business rebranded as Premier Stateliner. In 1982, Stateliner began operating Ansett Pioneer's Adelaide to Alice Springs service under contract. It was appointed as Austral's South Australian agent the same year.

In June 2016, the Adelaide to Goolwa via Victor Harbor service was sold to LinkSA. In July 2016 the tours and charters division was sold to Kanga Coaches with six coaches. In 2018 Premier Stateliner was rebranded Stateliner.

== Services ==
Stateliner operate services on the following routes:

- 1000: Adelaide to Ceduna
- 1001: Adelaide to Port Lincoln
- 1002: Adelaide to Whyalla via Port Broughton
- 1003: Adelaide to Whyalla via Lochiel
- 1180: Adelaide to Renmark
- 1181: Kingston on Murray to Loxton
- 1280: Adelaide to Mount Gambier via Kingston SE
- 1281: Adelaide to Mount Gambier via Bordertown

== Fleet ==
As at August 2025 the fleet consisted of 29 coaches.
