= Crisps Coaches =

Australian bus company

- Parent: Russell Crisp
- Headquarters: Warwick
- Service area: South East Queensland; Northern New South Wales
- Service type: Bus & coach operator
- Depots: 1
- Fleet: 18 (December 2023)
- Website: www.crisps.com.au

Crisps Coaches is an Australian bus company operating services in South East Queensland and Northern New South Wales

== Services ==
Crisps Coaches is a bus and coach operator, based in Warwick. As well as local school services it operates services from Warwick to Brisbane, Toowoomba, Tenterfield and Moree.

In 1992, the Brisbane to Moree and Toowoomba to Tenterfield services were purchased from Skennars.

In the neighbouring town of Stanthorpe, Crisps Coaches & Bus Lines is operated by Russell Crisp's brother Dale.

== Fleet ==
As at August 2014, the fleet consisted of 18 buses and coaches.
