= VDL Bova =

Dutch coachbuilder, est. 1931

- Industry: Automotive
- Founded: 1931
- Defunct: 2010
- Successor: VDL Bus & Coach
- Headquarters: Eindhoven, The Netherlands
- Products: Buses
- Parent: VDL Groep
- Website: www.vdlbova.nl

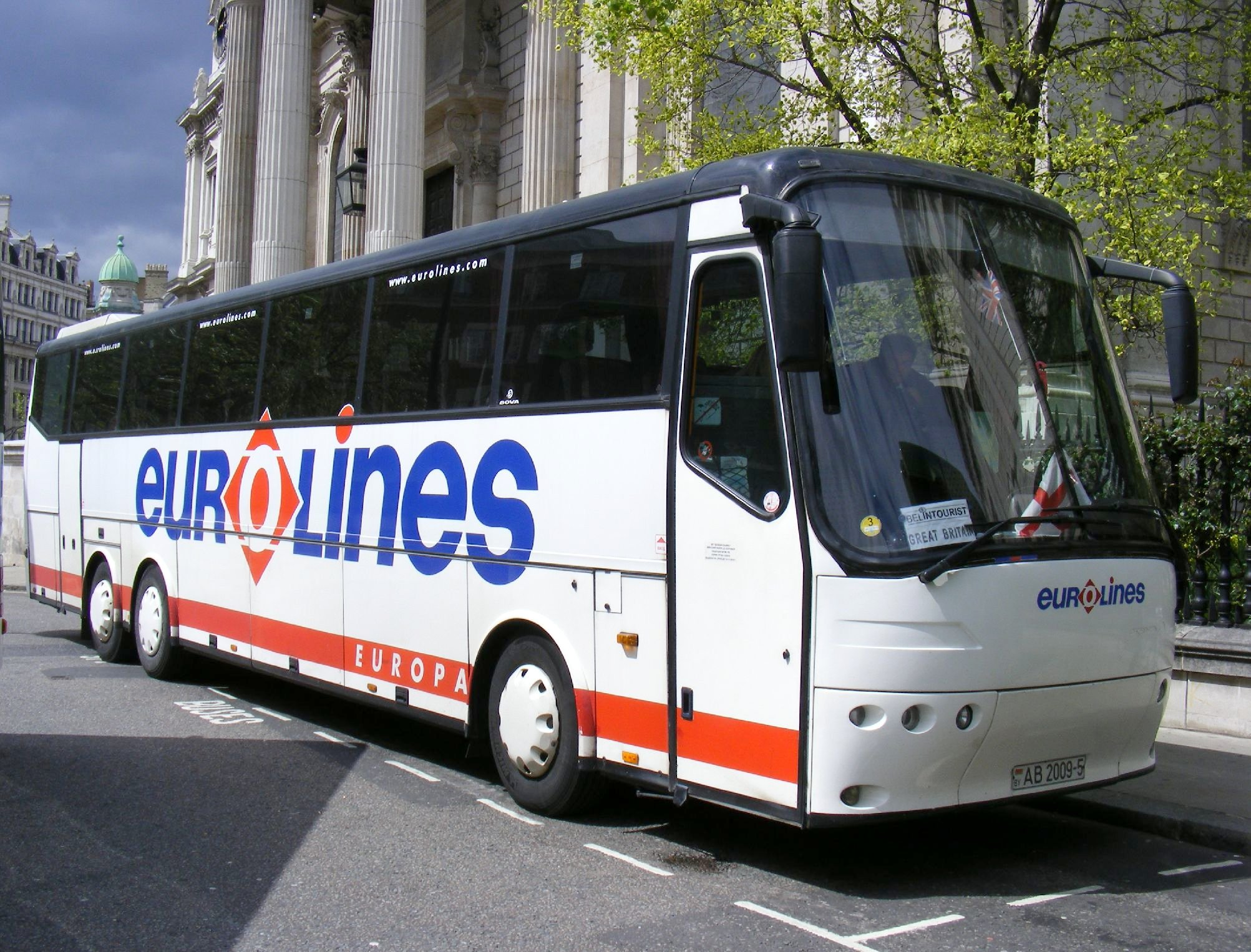
Eurolines Bova Futura in May 2010

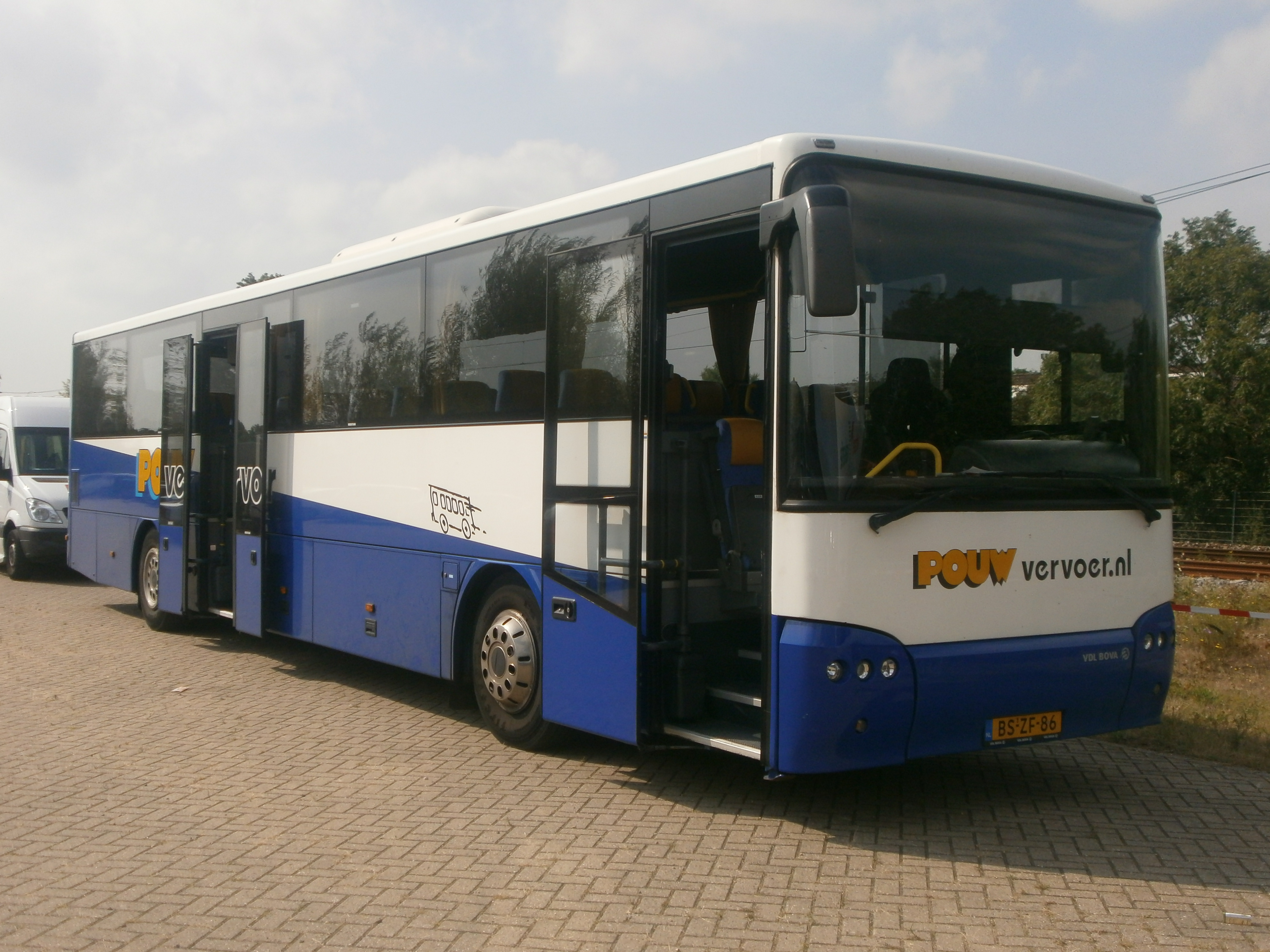
Bova Lexio in September 2012

VDL Bova was a luxury coachbuilder based in Eindhoven, in The Netherlands which began building coaches in 1931. In particular, it is well known for the Bova Futura, a streamlined coach usually powered by a DAF engine, which was first introduced in the 1980s and is still in production as of 2018 as the VDL Futura.

In 1878 Jacob D. Bots founded a timber business in Valkenswaard. When he died, he left the business to his eldest son Simon who first introduced the name Bova, which was derived from Bots Valkenswaard.

In 1931 the company began building coaches, and in 1969 introduced the Benelux, a self-supporting integral coach. The company was purchased by VDL Groep in 2003, who also owned the Berkhof, Jonckheere and VDL Bus Chassis brands. From 2010 the individual brands were discontinued and VDL Bova became part of VDL Bus & Coach.

== Products ==
=== Integral Buses and Coaches ===
- Benelux (coach/interurban, replaced by Europa)
- Europa (coach, replaced by Futura)
- Futura (coach/interurban, replaced by VDL Futura 2)
- Magiq (coach, derivative of Futura, replaced by VDL Futura 2)
- X-press (low-floor bus with rear engine, only 16 built in 1980)

=== Bus and Coach Chassis ===
- Calypso (coach, with Europa underframe and Duple bodywork)

=== Bus and Coach Bodywork ===
Initially Bova built bus bodywork on a variety of chassis, but switched to building integral vehicles in the early 1970s. After becoming part of VDL Groep some chassis/bodywork combinations of DAF/Berkhof heritage were sold as complete vehicles under the VDL Bova name:

- Lexio (interurban bus based on VDL SD400 chassis, replaced by VDL Citea)
- Synergy (double-deck coach based on VDL SBR4000 chassis, rebadged from Berkhof Axial 100. Replaced by VDL Futura FDD2)
