= RFW (company) =

- Industry: Vehicle manufacturing
- Founded: 1969
- Founder: Robert Frederick Whitehead
- Headquarters: Chester Hill, Australia
- Products: Customised buses & trucks
- Owner: Robert Frederick Whitehead

RFW was an Australian specialist vehicle manufacturer based in Chester Hill, Sydney. The firm specialized in heavy industrial vehicles including coaches, fire appliances, garbage trucks and road-rail vehicles for use in the Asia Pacific region. Many of its vehicles were all wheel drive. The RFW models featured a wide choice of original running gear for their wide range of vehicles for several roles from Scania, Caterpillar, Cummins, Detroit Diesel, Nissan Diesel UD, Rolls-Royce Diesel and also Bedford & Hino.

== History ==
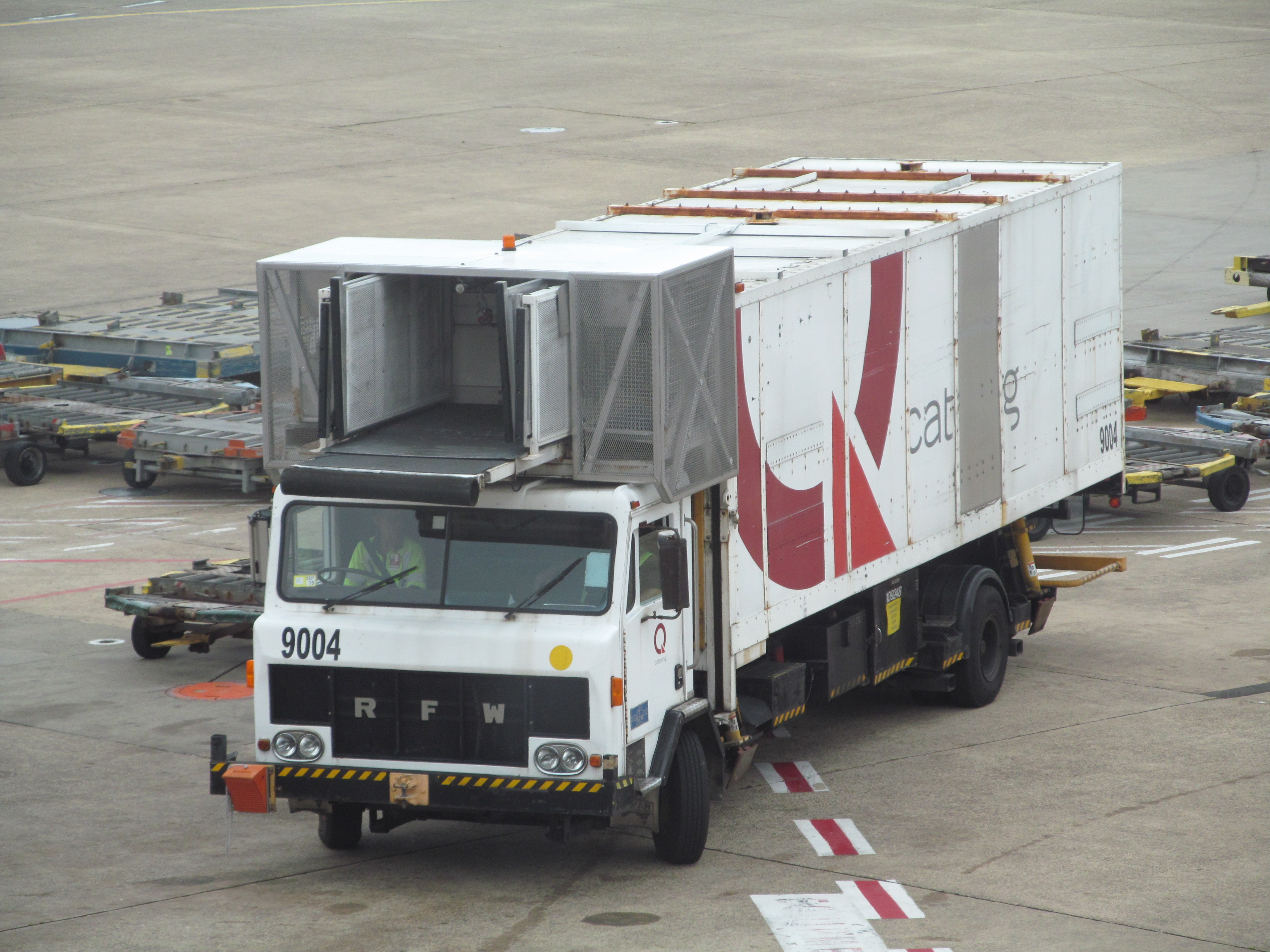
RFW airport catering vehicle at Sydney Airport in April 2015

RFW was founded by former Royal Australian Air Force fitter (Bob) Robert Frederick Whitehead. RFW completed its first vehicle in 1969, a 8 x 4 using a KM Bedford cab dump truck. All trucks & Bus chassis were custom hand built by a small team to customers specifications & requirements

== Output examples ==
- 9 Airport crash tenders for Royal Malaysian Air Force
- 7 6x6 trucks for EPT Electric Power Transmission at Maryong NSW
- 21 4x4 & 6x6 fire proof cab bush fire trucks for Woods & Forest Dept Mount Gambier SA
- 9 Coach chassis for Ansett Pioneer for use in the Northern Territory
- 3 Road-rail vehicles for Hamersley Iron
- 5 Road-rail vehicles for the State Rail Authority
- 14x14 wheel drive road legal Sewage pump for Brisbane City Council
- Catering vehicles for Qantas
