= Eurolines =

Long distance coach organisation

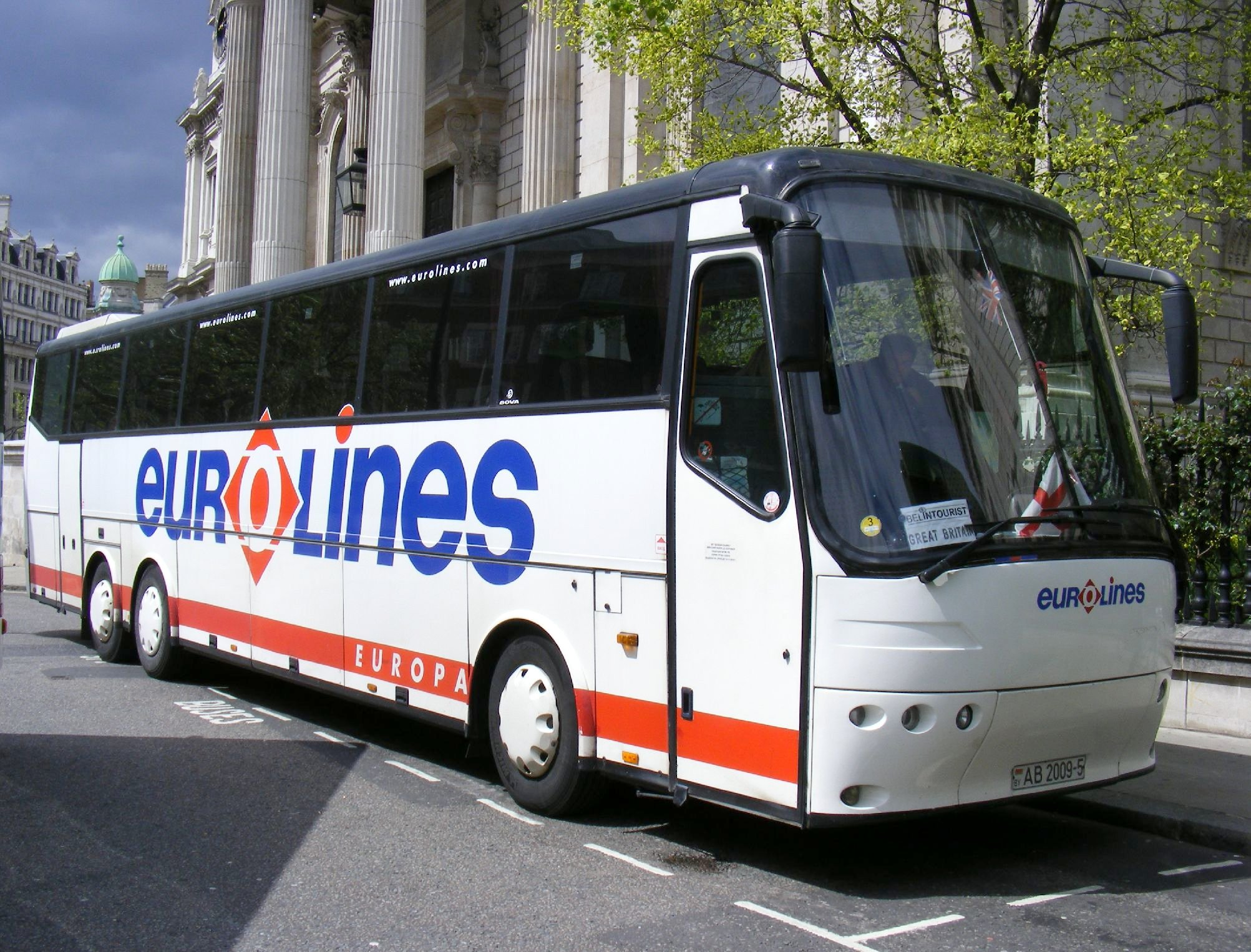
- Belintoustri Bova Futura
- Founded: 1985; 41 years ago
- Headquarters: Metrologielaan/Avenue de la Métrologie 6, 1130 Brussels, Belgium
- Service type: Intercity bus service
- Website: www.eurolines.lt/en www.expressway.ie/eurolines

Eurolines is a brand of intercity bus service owned by an international non-profit organisation formed under Belgian law. While several bus operators have used the Eurolines branding in the past, the only operators that still use the branding are UAB Kautra, which operates service between Lithuania and Estonia, Latvia, Ukraine, Belarus, and Poland, and Expressway Eurolines, which operates service between Ireland and the United Kingdom.

== History ==
Eurolines was founded in 1985. Its forerunner was the Europabus brand network created by the Union des Services Routiers des Chemins de Fer Européens (URF), a consortium of 11 European national railway companies, in 1951.

In 2010, Lux Express left the Eurolines network.

In 2017, the Eurolines routes to/from Romania were integrated into FlixBus.

In January 2018, National Express Coaches withdrew from the Eurolines network, instead partnering with Ouibus.

In April 2019, the Eurolines operating businesses in France, The Netherlands, Belgium, Czech Republic and Spain, all of which were formerly owned by Veolia Transport and later Transdev, were acquired by FlixBus.

In July 2020, Eurolines operators in France were placed into compulsory liquidation by a French court.

== Safety incidents ==
- In August 2010, a Eurolines bus traveling from the Netherlands to Crespin, Nord crashed after the driver fell asleep at the wheel, killing one person.
- In August 2013, a Eurolines bus overturned in southern France, killing two people.
- In June 2016, nine people were injured when a bus hit a stationary vehicle on the motorway near Dortmund, Germany.
