= MotorCoach Australia =

Australian bus manufacturer

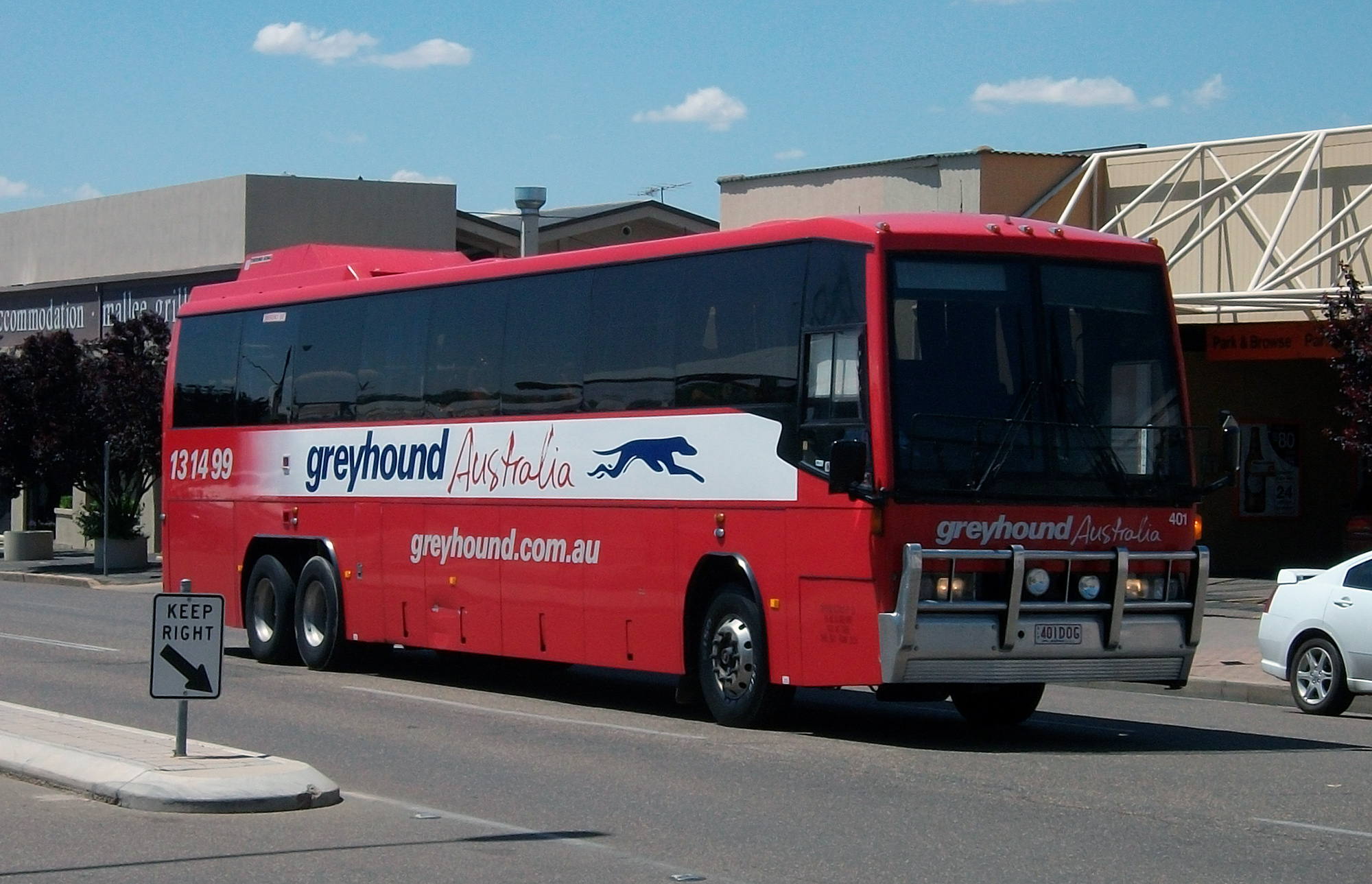
- Greyhound Australia Motorcoach in Wagga Wagga in November 2009
- Industry: Bus manufacturing
- Founded: 1982
- Founder: Kevin Johnson; Dick White
- Defunct: 2004
- Headquarters: Kingston, Australia
- Parent: McCafferty's

MotorCoach Australia was an Australian bus manufacturer in Kingston, Brisbane.

== History ==
MotorCoach Australia was formed in 1982 by former Denning employees Kevin Johnson and Dick White based in Kingston. It initially manufactured bus chassis with Caterpillar, Cummins and General Motors engine options. In 1986 it began to build bodies, both on its own chassis and those of other manufacturers.

In 1995 it was placed in administration and purchased by Clifford Corporation with coaches built under the Austral Pacific Highlander name at the Austral Pacific plant in Geebung. Following Clifford Corporation's collapse, it was purchased by McCafferty's. As well as building coaches for McCafferty's it also completed orders for external customers. It closed in 2004 having completed over 60 coaches.
