= Ansett Pioneer =

Australian commercial intercity bus company

- Parent: Ansett Transport Industries
- Founded: 1905
- Ceased operation: 1993
- Headquarters: Melbourne
- Service area: Adelaide; Brisbane; Canberra; Darwin; Melbourne; Perth; Sydney various regional destinations
- Service type: Coach services

Ansett Pioneer was an Australian long distance coach operator. Founded in 1905 as the AA Withers Bus Company, the company maintained continuous operation under a variety of corporate monikers until its 1993 merger into Greyhound Pioneer Australia.

== History ==
Ansett Pioneer's origin can be traced back to 1905 when AA Withers Bus Company commenced operating day tours in Melbourne. In 1923 it was renamed Pioneer and in 1927 undertook a transcontinental trip from Melbourne to Darwin. In 1944 Pioneer was sold to Reg Ansett. In 1955 Pioneer began operating daily services between Melbourne and Sydney and in 1957 began operating a weekly service from Adelaide to Perth. In 1958 Pioneer Express was renamed Ansett Roadlines of Australia.

In July 1986 Ansett Transport Industries sold Ansett Pioneer to Melbourne and Northern Territory bus proprietors John Sinclair and Ron King.

In January 1988 Ansett Pioneer was split in three:

- Cairns to Melbourne services were taken over by the Penfold family, owners of Greyhound's northern operations
- Perth - Adelaide - Melbourne, Adelaide - Sydney & Adelaide - Sydney were taken over by the Crawford family, owners of Premier Stateliner and Greyhound's southern operations
- Sydney - Canberra - Snowy Mountains services were retained by Sinclair and Kings trading as Pioneer Trailways

In July 1988 the operation was rebranded Pioneer. In February 1989 Pioneer Trailways was placed in liquidation.

In November 1989 the Penfolds sold out to the Crawfords bringing all Greyhound and Pioneer services under common ownership. In 1992 Greyhound and Pioneer merged with Bus Australia and in 1993 all three were united under the Greyhound Pioneer Australia brand.

== Fleet ==
Many of Ansett Pioneer's early coaches were Reo and GMC chassis bodied by Ansair. It also imported Flxible Clippers, GM PD-4106s, GM PD-4107s, MCI MC-7s, MCI MC-8s and MCI MC-9s from North America.

In the 1980s it purchased locally built RFW, Austral Tourmaster and Denning Landseer coaches as well as Ansair bodied Mercedes-Benz O303s, Volgren bodied Volvo B10Ms and Kässbohrer Setras.
