= BusBiz =

- Parent: Pickering family
- Commenced operation: 1960; 65 years ago
- Headquarters: Swan Hill
- Service type: Bus services
- Fleet: 129 (February 2020)
- Website: www.shbl.com.au

BusBiz is an Australian bus company operating in New South Wales, South Australia and Victoria.

== History ==
The origins of BusBiz can be traced back to 1954 when Lake Boga Transport was formed to transport fruit from the Lake Boga area to Melbourne. In 1960 it diversified into school buses trading as Swan Hill Bus Lines. In December 2016, the Peel Valley Coaches business in Tamworth, New South Wales was purchased. In 2017 the South Australian business of Townsends Travel was purchased. In 2018 it took over B&I Johnson of Brewarrina with two buses.

== Services ==
As well as route and school services, BusBiz operates long distance services under contract for V/Line from Swan Hill to Mildura, Swan Hill to Bendigo and Mildura to Melbourne. In January 2015, it commenced operating services for NSW TrainLink from Dubbo to Lithgow, Nyngan, Lightning Ridge, Bourke, Brewarrina and Broken Hill.
