= Bus Australia =

Australian commercial intercity bus company

- Parent: Max Winkless
- Founded: 1985
- Ceased operation: 1993
- Headquarters: Adelaide
- Service area: Australia wide
- Service type: Coach services
- Fleet: 76 (July 1989)

Bus Australia was a short-lived Australian interstate coach operator formed in 1985 when Volvo Trucks dealer Max Winkless from Perth linked Across Australia Coachlines with Briscoe's Coachlines and Quest Tours of Adelaide, and Perth based Parlorcars Group. In 1989 the east coast-based Intertour business was purchased with 27 coaches. In 1993 Bus Australia merged with Greyhound Australia and Ansett Pioneer to form Greyhound Pioneer Australia.

== Fleet ==
While operating the standard Austral Tourmaster and Denning Landseer coaches, in 1986 Bus Australia began importing Bova Futura coaches from the Netherlands. Some were assembled in Perth by JW Bolton. Fleet livery was white, red and blue.
