= Greyhound Australia =

Australian intercity bus company

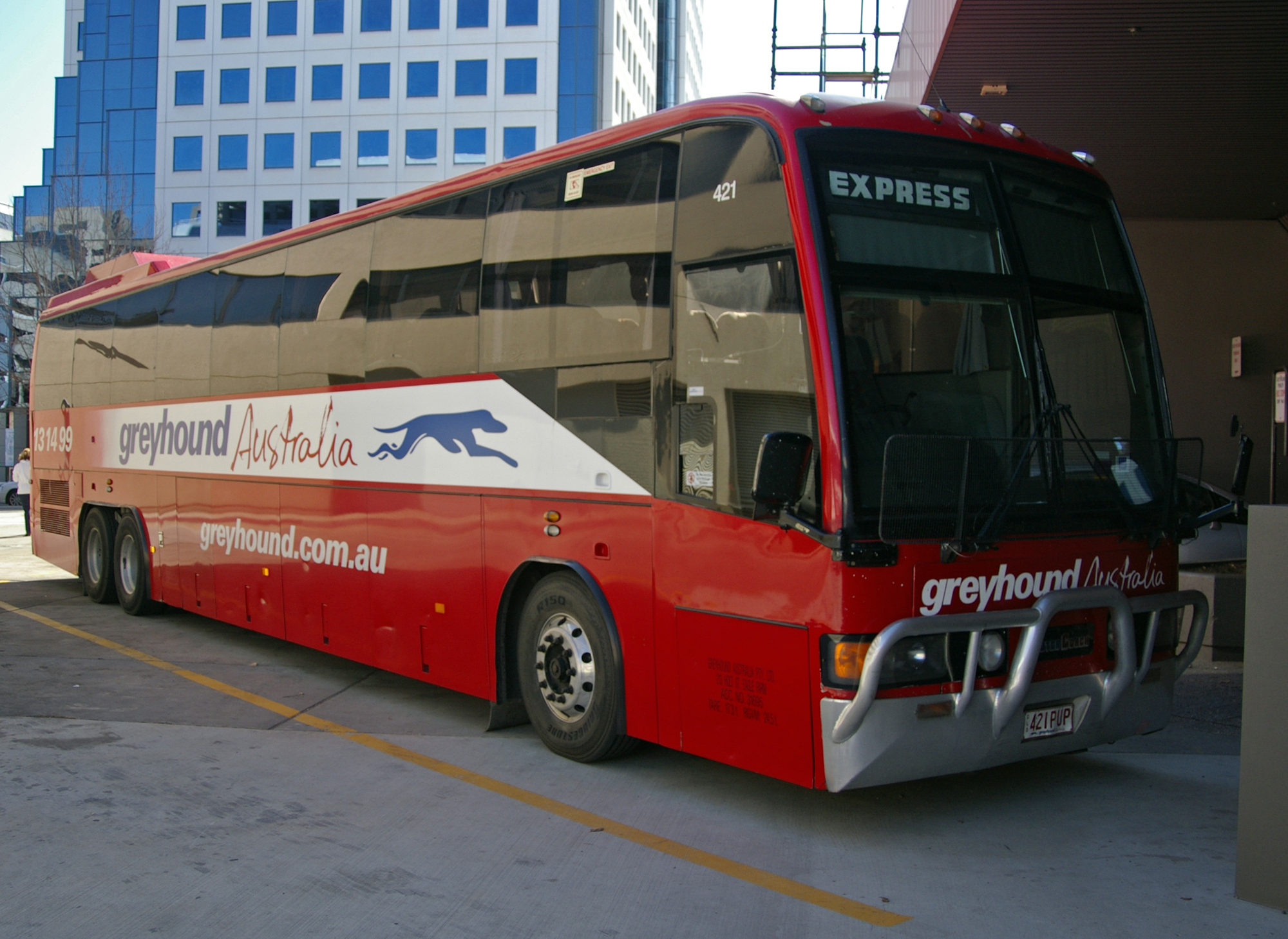
- MotorCoach Australia at the Jolimont Centre, Canberra in August 2009
- Parent: Entrada Travel Group
- Founded: 1928
- Headquarters: Pinkenba, Brisbane, Queensland , Australia
- Service type: Coach operator
- Destinations: Adelaide; Brisbane; Broome; Cairns; Canberra; Darwin; Melbourne; Sydney; Toowoomba various regional destinations
- Fleet: 77 (October 2026)
- Website: www.greyhound.com.au

Greyhound Australia is an Australian coach operator that operates services in all mainland states and territories.

It is owned by Entrada Travel Group. The company was established in 1928 and is not affiliated with similarly named companies in other countries.

== History ==
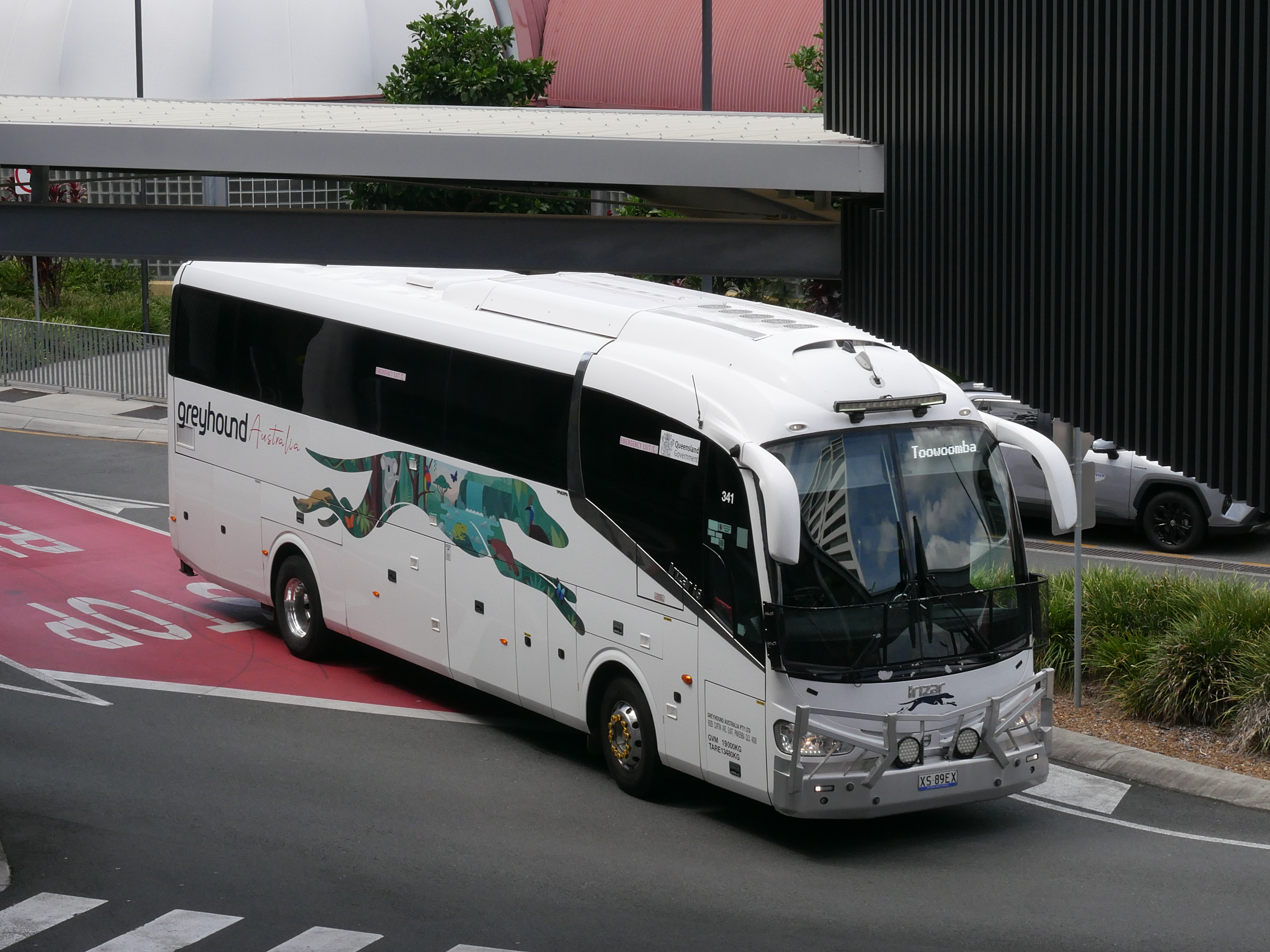
Irizar I6 bodied Volvo B8R at Brisbane Coach Terminal in February 2026

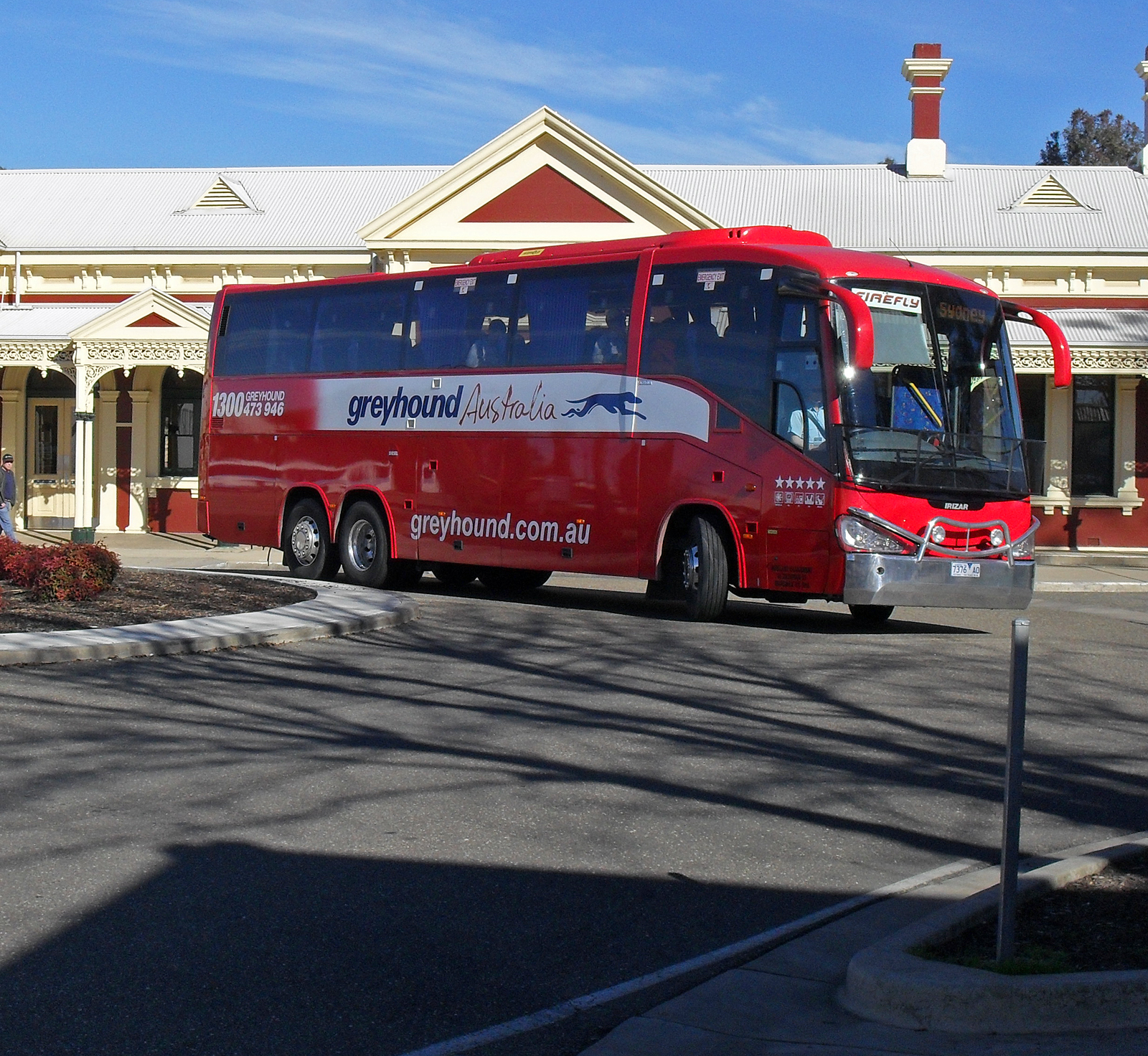
Irizar Century bodied Scania K380IB at Wagga Wagga station in July 2009

Greyhound Coaches was formed in Toowoomba in 1928 by Russell Penfold with a service between Toowoomba and Brisbane. In 1956 and again in 1962 Greyhound attempted to enter the interstate passenger express field but without success. In 1968, after entering the market a third time, the company succeeded in establishing services between Brisbane, Sydney, Melbourne and Adelaide with Perth and Darwin added in the 1970s creating a national coach company.

In 1975, the South Australian operations were franchised to Adelaide operators, Murray Valley Coaches, and Stateliner.

In November 1989, the Penfold family sold Greyhound Coaches to Stateliner with the exception of the Brisbane – Gold Coast and Brisbane – Toowoomba services that were sold separately. In 1992 Greyhound, Pioneer and Bus Australia merged with the combined operation rebranded Greyhound Pioneer Australia.

In February 1999, Queensland Coach Company was formed by Greyhound Pioneer Australia to body 94 Scania coaches over five years to renew the fleet. Originally an alliance was formed with bodybuilder Alan B Denning with it proposed the Galaxy body design be used. However, following the collapse of the Clifford Corporation, the rights to the Austral Pacific Majestic body were purchased. In July 2000, Queensland Coach Company ceased trading and was put into administration.

In March 2000, Greyhound Pioneer Australia entered discussions with McCafferty's about a potential merge. Subsequently Premier Motor Service made an unsuccessful takeover bid for the business. In September 2000, a takeover bid from McCafferty's was accepted.

In October 2004, McCafferty's sold the combined business to the ANZ Bank and George Chapman with both operations rebranded as Greyhound Australia. In 2006 ANZ sold its shares to KordaMentha.

In 2005, the Sunshine Coast to Byron Bay services of Suncoast Pacific were purchased. In October 2011, the Oz Experience backpacker business was purchased.

In 2019, Greyhound Australia signed a three-month contract with BMD Group, a construction company that is building the railway from the planned Carmichael coal mine to Abbot Point. After the contract became public in early 2020, the Citizens of the Great Barrier Reef Foundation withdrew from its partnership with Greyhound and School Strike 4 Climate announced that it was planning to boycott the company. Greyhound subsequently announced that it would be withdrawing from the contract "following considered deliberation, and in the best interests of our staff, customers, and partners".

In February 2021, Greyhound Australia agreed terms to sell its Greyhound Resources business that provides mine transport for workers in the Bowen Basin, Hunter Valley, South Australia and Northern Territory to the Kinetic Group with 170 vehicles. The deal closed in April 2021.

Some intrastate services in Queensland are subsidised by the Government of Queensland. In December 2021 Greyhound Australia recommenced servicing the intercity routes it lost in December 2014 to Bus Queensland Toowoomba.

- Brisbane to Mount Isa via Toowoomba, Roma, Charleville, Augathella, Blackall, Longreach, Winton and Cloncurry
- Mount Isa to Brisbane via Cloncurry, Winton, Longreach, Blackall, Augathella, Charleville, Roma and Toowoomba
- Brisbane to Charleville via Toowoomba, Dalby, Chinchilla, Miles, Roma, Mitchell and Morven
- Charleville to Brisbane via Morven, Mitchell, Roma, Miles, Chinchilla, Dalby and Toowoomba

In December 2023, Entrada Travel Group acquired Greyhound Australia.

There was a crash involving a Greyhound bus on the Bruce Highway in north Queensland on 30 June 2024, resulting in three fatalities.

== Routes ==
Greyhound Australia routes as at March 2025 include:

- Sydney to Canberra
- Sydney to Thredbo – snow season (June to September) only
- Sydney to Melbourne via Canberra
- Melbourne to Adelaide – operated by Firefly Express under a codeshare agreement
- Brisbane to Sydney via Pacific Highway
- Brisbane to Byron Bay
- Brisbane to Noosa Junction
- Brisbane to Hervey Bay
- Brisbane to Agnes Water
- Brisbane to Cairns
- Brisbane to Toowoomba
- Brisbane to Miles
- Brisbane to Charleville
- Brisbane to Mount Isa
- Mackay to Cairns
- Rockhampton to Emerald
- Rockhampton to Longreach
- Rockhampton to Toowoomba
- Townsville to Alice Springs
- Townsville to Mount Isa
- Adelaide to Alice Springs
- Alice Springs to Darwin
- Darwin to Broome

== Former routes ==
- Adelaide to Perth Nullarbor Plain service ran from the 1970s until 2005
- Melbourne to Toowoomba ceased March 2013
- Broome to Perth
- Lithgow to Gulgong and Coonabarabran to Baradine under contract to CountryLink (between July 2010 and June 2014).
- Canberra to Wagga Wagga ceased in August 2017
- Darwin to Jabiru ceased in January 2020.

== Other services ==
Greyhound Australia introduced freight delivery services in 1985, and transports more than 220,000 items annually to 120+ locations in Australia.

== Fleet ==
In the 1970s, Greyhound imported a fleet of Eagle 05 and 10 coaches. In the 1980s it purchased Austral Tourmasters and Volgren bodied Volvo B10Ms. In 1995, it standardized on Scania coaches. When merging with McCafferty's in 2004 it inherited Austral Denning Highlanders, Denning Denairs, Denning Landseers (including their high deck variants) and Motorcoach Australia Marathons and Classics. More recently it has purchased Iveco, Mercedes-Benz and Volvos. As at October 2026, the fleet consisted of 77 coaches. In the 1970s, Greyhound adopted an orange and white livery. In 1993 a grey, white and blue livery was introduced following the formation of Greyhound Pioneer Australia. McCafferty's gold livery was applied when it took over the business in 2000 before the current red livery was introduced in 2004.

== Other Greyhound operations ==
Despite its name, Greyhound Australia has never had any affiliation with Greyhound Lines, Greyhound Canada, Greyhound Mexico or Greyhound UK.
