= Queensland Coach Company =

Australian bus bodybuilder

- Industry: Bus manufacturing
- Founded: February 1999
- Founder: Greyhound Pioneer Australia
- Defunct: July 2000
- Fate: Administration
- Headquarters: Eagle Farm, Australia
- Parent: Greyhound Pioneer Australia

Queensland Coach Company was an Australian bus bodybuilder in Eagle Farm, Brisbane.

== History ==
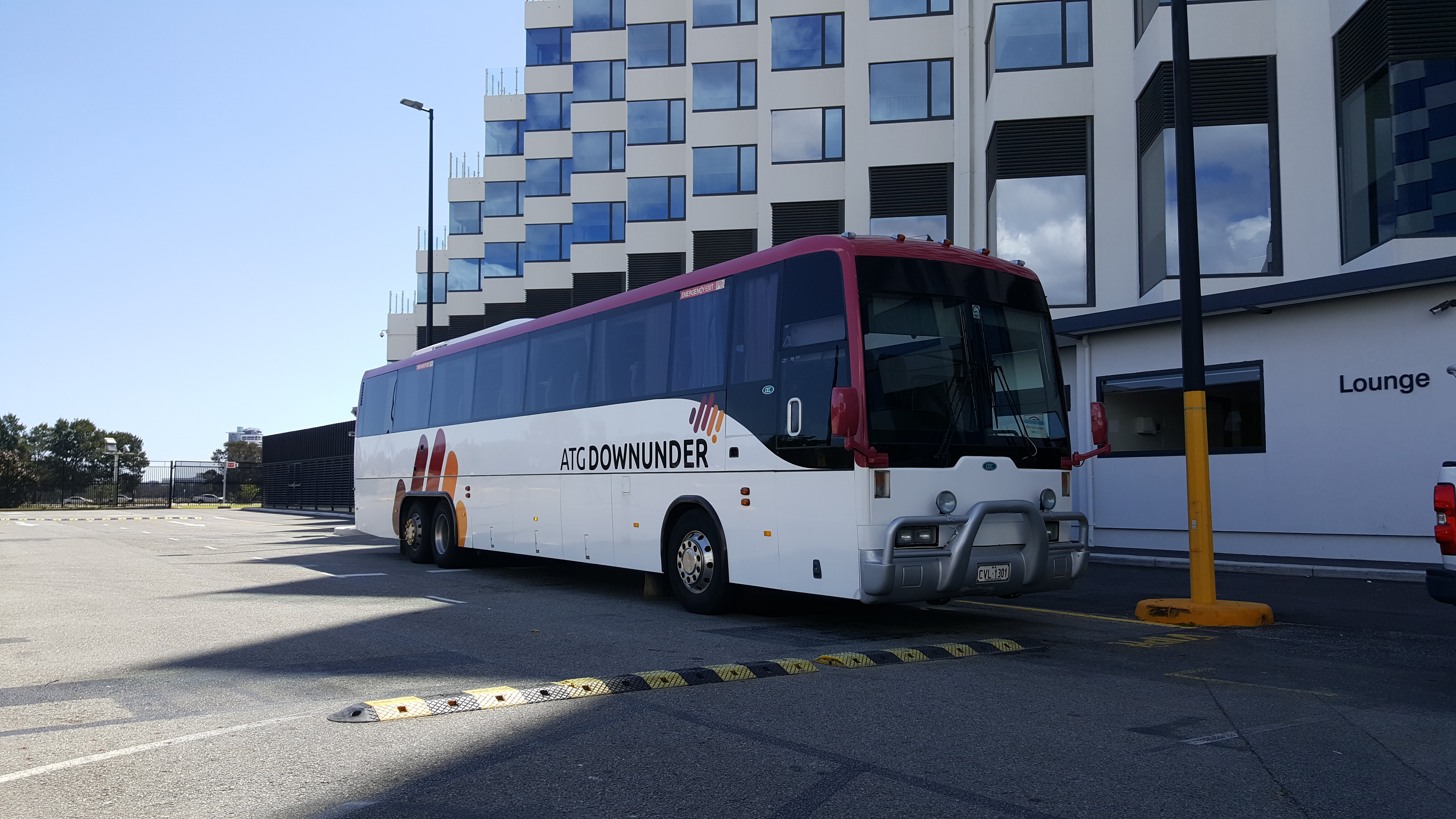
Australian Transit Group Queensland Coach Company bodied Scania K124EB at Crown Perth in October 2019

Queensland Coach Company was established in February 1999 by Greyhound Pioneer Australia to body 135 Scania coaches over five years, including 94 for its interstate coach operation. Originally an alliance was formed with bodybuilder Alan B Denning with it proposed the Galaxy body design be used. But following the collapse of the Clifford Corporation, the rights to the Austral Pacific Majestic body were purchased.

In July 2000 Queensland Coach Company ceased trading and was placed into liquidation. The rights to the Majestic body were sold to Mills-Tui.

While many of the coaches bodied were Scania K113TRB and K124EBs for Greyhound Pioneer Australia, it also bodied buses and coaches for external clients. A total of 46 bodies were completed. It last vehicle was a Hino RG230 for Casino Bus Service.
