= Australian Pacific Touring =

Australian commercial intercity bus company

Australian Pacific Touring (APT)
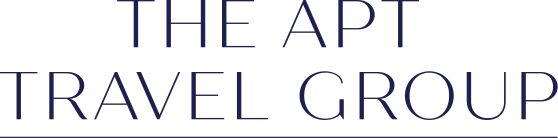
- Type: Privately held corporation
- Industry: Tour and River Cruising Operator
- Founded: 1927
- Headquarters: Melbourne, Australia
- Area served: Africa; Antarctica; Asia; Australia; Europe; New Zealand; North America; South America
- Owner: The McGeary Family
- Website: www.aptouring.com

Australian Pacific Touring (APT) is an Australian tour and river cruising operator with worldwide reach.

== History ==
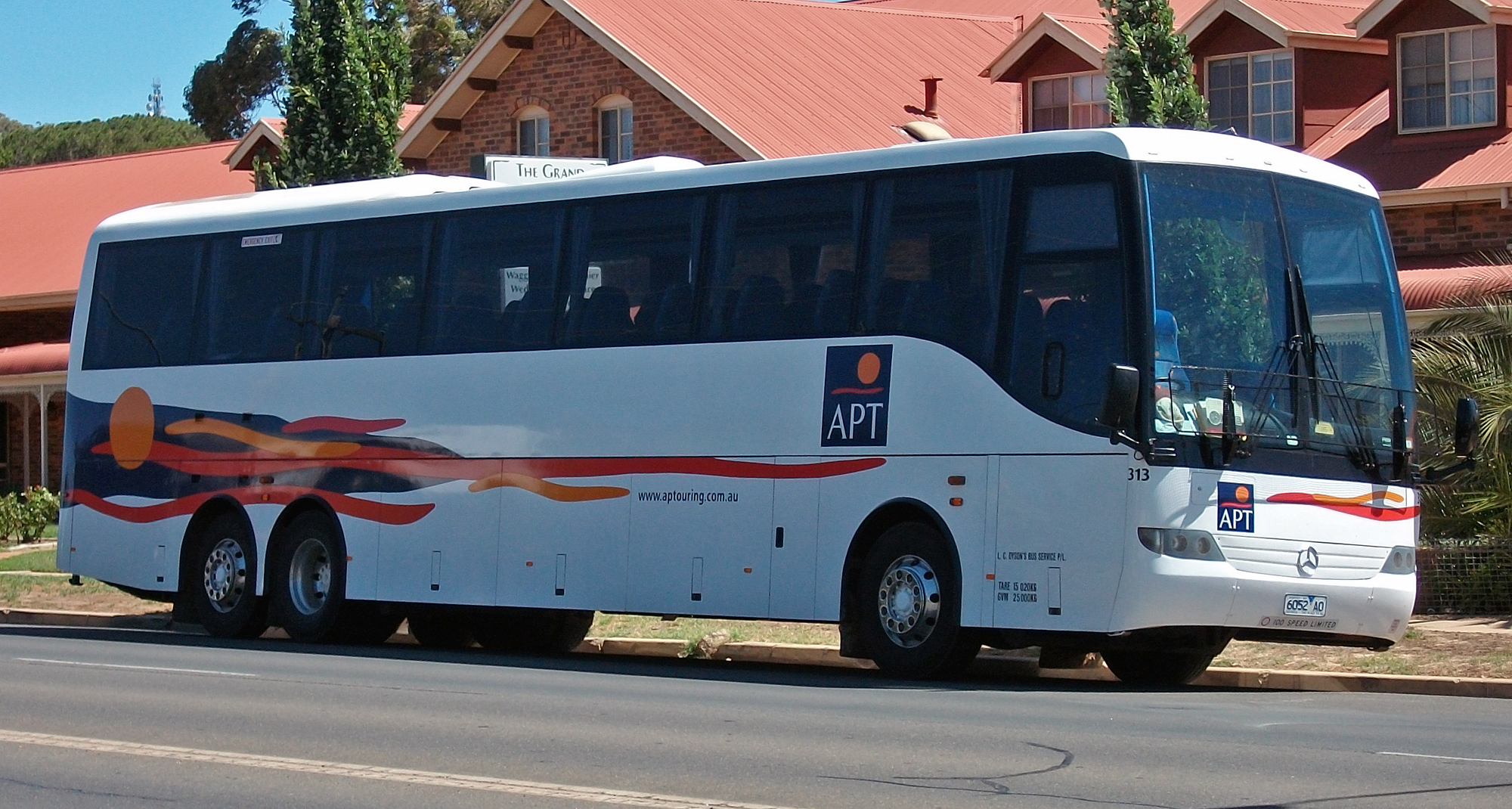
Coach Design bodied Mercedes Benz O500RF-3 operated by Dysons in Wagga Wagga in December 2009

Alfred William (Bill) McGeary was born in 1900 in Victoria. A fitter and turner by trade, McGeary bought, re-built and sold cars and motorcycles. After moving to the country, McGeary worked as foreman for Queen's Bridge Motors, a Warracknabeal garage. The foundations of APT were laid in 1924 when McGeary converted his tray truck into a bus and joined with other enterprising operators to transport commuters left stranded by an extended cable-tram strike in Melbourne's northern suburbs. McGeary learned it was necessary to drop off and pick up customers very quickly as the striking tramway workers would attempt to tip the bus over on its side. In 1927 he purchased his first new bus for a route from Northcote to connect with the tram and train lines at Clifton Hill.

In 1933, McGeary sold his interest in the bus route from Northcote and purchased a busier three-bus route, which ran along South Road between Moorabbin, Middle Brighton and Brighton Beach in Melbourne's south. This new business interest saw McGeary and his wife of two years, Hazel, move to Brighton. With his new home set on a double block of land, it was not long before Bill and his brother George, who also worked as a driver, built a large timber garage in the yard to house the three buses.

The first half of the 1940s saw the business continue to expand taking on more buses and employees, and acquiring several new routes. It was a busy and productive time, punctuated by the birth of Bill and Hazel's only son, Geoff, on 26 June 1941. Towards the decade's end, McGeary began to look beyond merely servicing bus routes. Gaining his first charter license, he secured a contract to take students to and from Firbank Grammar School and Haileybury College, where Geoff was a student. With the resulting money, the McGeary's first Federal coach was bought, taking the fleet to five buses which, in addition to running commuter routes, were put to use on school runs as well as trips to the trots and greyhounds.

Reasoning that the age of commuter buses was nearing its end, in 1950, McGeary sold his commuter routes when they were at their peak. Turning his attention entirely to school runs and charter work, he soon negotiated contracts with Star of the Sea College, Xavier Preparatory School and St Leonard's Girls' College, adding to the two school runs he was already operating. McGeary was diagnosed with Parkinson's disease in 1954, and his health, along with his business, swiftly deteriorated. Hazel worked tirelessly to both care for her husband and keep the bus business afloat, but by the late-1950s, it seemed that there was little choice but to sell.

Determined that the business should remain in the family, Geoff McGeary, at the age of 19, applied for special dispensation to obtain an under-age bus driving license. And so in February 1961, Geoff entered the family business.

== Formation of APT Luxury Travel ==
As the Australian tourism industry blossomed in the early 1960s, Geoff McGeary was busy driving buses seven days a week and also working long hours on the business side to make McGeary's Parlour Coaches (as it had become known) profitable once more. One of McGeary's clients at the time was a touring club, for which he began designing weekend holidays and even interstate tours. Quickly identifying the opportunities that recreational travel presented the bus industry, McGeary was soon selling mid-week day trips to kindergartens, extended journeys to school groups and sending his buses to Central Australia and Queensland on ground-breaking camping holidays. By 1966, with a total of ten buses, the reinvented business was thriving.

In the mid-1960s, Geoff McGeary and his closest competitor Mayer Page of Melbourne Motor Coaches, were elected to the charter committee of the Road Passenger Service Operator's Association. In February 1967 a partnership was formed when McGeary's Parlour Coaches joined forces with Page's Melbourne Motor Coaches and Quince's Scenicruisers to form Australian Pacific Coaches. With the merging of three separate business sites, the head office of Australian Pacific Coaches was situated in Brighton, on the old Page Motors site, the vehicles were serviced and maintained at McGeary's depot and a number of vehicles were stationed in Murrumbeena on Quince's depot. Quince's later withdrew from the partnership.

Though the bulk of the company's work was still in bus charter contracts at the start of the 1970s, Australian Pacific Coaches were increasingly turning their attention to extended touring. In 1971, McGeary and Page went to Sydney to buy advance tickets to the stage show Hair and began advertising weekend trips that operated every weekend for over two years, with sometimes as many as three or four coaches. Soon "Lost Weekends", "Hot Snow Weekends", Sydney and Melbourne day tours and accommodated tours to Queensland, Western Australia, the Northern Territory and Tasmania helped the company capitalise on its burgeoning reputation. Australian Pacific Coaches then forayed into camping trips to Central Australia.

In 1983 Australian Pacific Coaches was renamed Australian Pacific Tours and in October 2000 as Australian Pacific Touring. In 2025, the company launched its elevated rebrand of or APT Luxury Travel, representing its flagship five-star offering of cruises and tours around the world.

Over the following decades, the McGeary family's involvement in the business continued through Geoff's children, Robert (Rob) McGeary and Louise (Lou) Tandy (nee McGeary). Rob McGeary held a range of roles across the business, including tour guiding and investments, while Lou Tandy worked in marketing for Kimberley Wilderness Adventures and later Captain's Choice. At the end of 2023, Rob and Lou became Co-Owners and Directors of The APT Travel Group, succeeding Geoff McGeary in the company's leadership.

Geoff McGeary OAM passed away in 2025 surrounded by family. In January 2026, Rob McGeary announced his retirement after more than 40 years with the company. Lou Tandy (nee McGeary) currently serves as The APT Travel Group Family Principal and Director, continuing the company’s nearly 100-year family-owned history.

== Introduction into the global market ==
As the APT business began to expand, New Zealanders were the first internationals to join APT tours, followed soon after by travellers from North America, the United Kingdom and mainland Europe. Between 1970 and 1975, offices were opened in Auckland, Los Angeles and London, then in the United States and Canada. APT's first overseas tour to New Zealand was met with such enthusiasm that McGeary and Page began regularly taking Australians to experience "The Land of the Long White Cloud". APT had outgrown its new headquarters in Brighton and in 1974 bought a building in Hampton. This would go on to act as the global Head Office to the APT family for the next 37 years.

The 1980s was a period of rapid expansion and acquisition for APT. McGeary and Page purchased Trans Australia Airlines' coach travel business on 11 November 1983. This business comprised many separate brands including AAT, Bill Kings Australian Adventure Tours, Red Centre Tours, Grand Central Over 50s Tours and the Central Australian Tours Association. McGeary and Page consolidated all these brands into, what is still known today as, AAT Kings, then was rebuilt as a separate touring business to compete with APT. At the same time, a small corporate office was set up in Port Melbourne to give independence to these two major competing brands.

In the 1990s, APT's camping safaris gained in popularity, particularly with Europeans. These tours, ranging from 23 to 63 days, covered the remotest parts of Australia, including the Tanami Track, Birdsville Track and Gibb River Road. Completely self-sufficient, the 48-passenger coaches, towed safari trailers with refrigeration, food, tents and everything needed to survive touring the Australian Outback. Following individual annual departures to Canada, Alaska and the US, sold to APT Club members, in 1991 APT's Canada & Alaska program was established and continued to grow significantly throughout the decade. This program marked APT's first major foray outside Australia, New Zealand and traditional coach-only touring, to now include cruise ships.

In 1993, Geoff McGeary and Mayer Page ended their 27-year partnership, with Page taking AAT Kings and McGeary taking APT. In 1997 Page sold AAT Kings to Bermuda-based Travel Corporation, owner of such brand names as Trafalgar Tours, Insight Vacations and Contiki. McGeary and Page remained friends until Page died in 2006.

In 1996, APT acquired Newmans Escorted Tours, expanding the company's presence in New Zealand. The takeover included Travelmarvel, signaling APT's move into the affordable travel market. In 1998, APT purchased Australian Kakadu Tours as a launch pad for APT's Northern Territory short breaks program, further defining APT and AAT Kings as head-on competitors. Meanwhile, touring in New Zealand continued to go from strength to strength, with the UK, Europe, Canada and Australia being the major contributing markets. In New Zealand, APT now offered three levels of touring product, operated from the Auckland office of 30 staff.

In May 2001, APT sold its fleet of 90 coaches to a consortium of Cobb & Co, Dysons and Sid Fogg's with each holding an equal share. Removing the coach fleet redefined APT as a tour operator, highlighted by the purchase in June 2001, of a stake in a specialist luxury operator to remote destinations with a focus on cruises, tours by Private Jet and overland tours using trains, river ships and coaches.

Responding to changing market demand, APT ceased operating camping tours in Australia in 2001 and expanded into other domestic enterprises purchasing Sahara Tours, an 18-vehicle touring business operating in Central Australia. In 2003, this was complemented by the purchase of Billy Can Tours operating around the Northern Territory's Top End. In the same year a 60% shareholding in Kimberley Wilderness Adventures was purchased from the Wunan Foundation, with its network of camps in the Kimberley region of Western Australia. In 2003/04, APT made the move into the youth and adventure travel market by purchasing shares in domestic tour operator Connections, from James Nathan, and a minority stake in European tour operator Topdeck, with its founders.

In 2005, APT entered another expanding travel market when the company invested in river cruise business AmaWaterways, in partnership with longtime friend and North American tour expert, Jimmy Murphy and cruising expert, Rudi Schriner.

In 2006 APT licensed the operation of APT Day Tours in Melbourne and Sydney to Dallas Newton, former APT General Manager with coaches in Sydney provided by Crowthers.

In June 2009, APT advanced onto the Russian travel scene by purchasing a 51% stake in the UK train operator GW Travel – a leading provider of long-distance luxury rail journeys, which operates private trains throughout Russia and its former Republics, as well as through Mongolia and China. In 2012, this was renamed to Golden Eagle Luxury Trains (GELT).

In June 2012 APT became partners and shareholders with leading UK cruise specialist Noble Caledonia and its luxury expedition ship MS Island Sky.

In July 2012 APT entered a license agreement with AAT Kings to provide all APT day touring and short breaks in Melbourne, Sydney and the Northern Territory, with the latter to provide all ground transport. This saw some AAT Kings coaches repainted in APT livery.

In January 2014 Geoff McGeary was awarded a Medal of the Order of Australian (OAM) for services to Tourism in the 2014 Australia Day Honours.

In April 2019 the APT Travel Group announced the formation of OneTomorrow, a philanthropic charitable fund operated by the business, chaired by Robert McGeary (son of Geoff McGeary).

In 2026, APT Luxury Travel expanded into the North American market, offering tours and cruises to travellers in the United States and Canada. The expansion also included key tour operators from the broader APT Travel Group brands including Travelmarvel, Captain's Choice and Botanica World Discoveries.

== APT investments ==
=== Original coach fleet ===
In 1927, Bill McGeary purchased his first new bus, which was painted brown with the words "Deluxe Motors" in gold along the side. By the time his son, Geoff, took over the business, there were five vehicles; a Chevrolet, two Fords and two SB Bedfords ranging in age from seven to eleven years. In the 1970s the fleet primarily consisted of Denning bodied Mercedes-Benz O302s and later Denning Denairs. In 1978, Ansair bodied Mercedes-Benz O303 42 seaters were purchased; fully equipped with air conditioning, hydraulic tilt seats, a chemical toilet and trailer towing attachment. The livery was originally white with red stripes being modified in the mid-1990s with dark blue and orange added. By 1991, APT had a fleet of 70 Mercedes Benz coaches, with assorted small passenger vehicles and Unimogs.

=== Fleet of river boats ===
The APT Travel Group invested in the building of luxury river boats in Europe in 2005 with Jimmy Murphy of Brennan Tours and cruising expert, Rudi Schreiner. Through a co-ownership of AmaWaterways, by 2009 APT had a fleet of ships and had pioneered full-size French balconies within 75% of all cabins on board the AmaWaterways Europe river cruise fleet and subsequently the all-weather twin balcony. APT and AmaWaterways expanded into Russia with the major reconstruction and renovation of the MS AmaKatarina. APT and AmaWaterways, in partnership with Indochina Sails, built a ship in Vietnam on the Mekong River, the MS AmaLotus, in 2012. Amawaterways built a second ship, the AmaDara in 2015. In 2017 AmaLotus underwent an extensive refurbishment of all the public spaces, and removed some passenger cabins. Along with other enhancements, a casual sundeck cafe and exclusive fine dining Luke Nguyen restaurant Indochine was added.

In 2023, APT Luxury Travel introduced Mekong Serenity to its river cruise fleet, operating itineraries on the Mekong River through Vietnam and Cambodia. The vessel accommodates 88 passengers across 44 suites.

In 2024, APT Luxury Travel launched MS Estrela, a river ship built for cruises on Portugal's Douro River. The vessel accommodates 116 passengers in 58 suites.

In 2025, APT Luxury Travel introduced the sister ships APT Solara and APT Ostara to its European river cruise fleet. Each vessel accommodates 154 passengers across 77 suites and was designed in collaboration with Melbourne-based design studio Hecker Guthrie and hospitality company Fellow Hospitality.

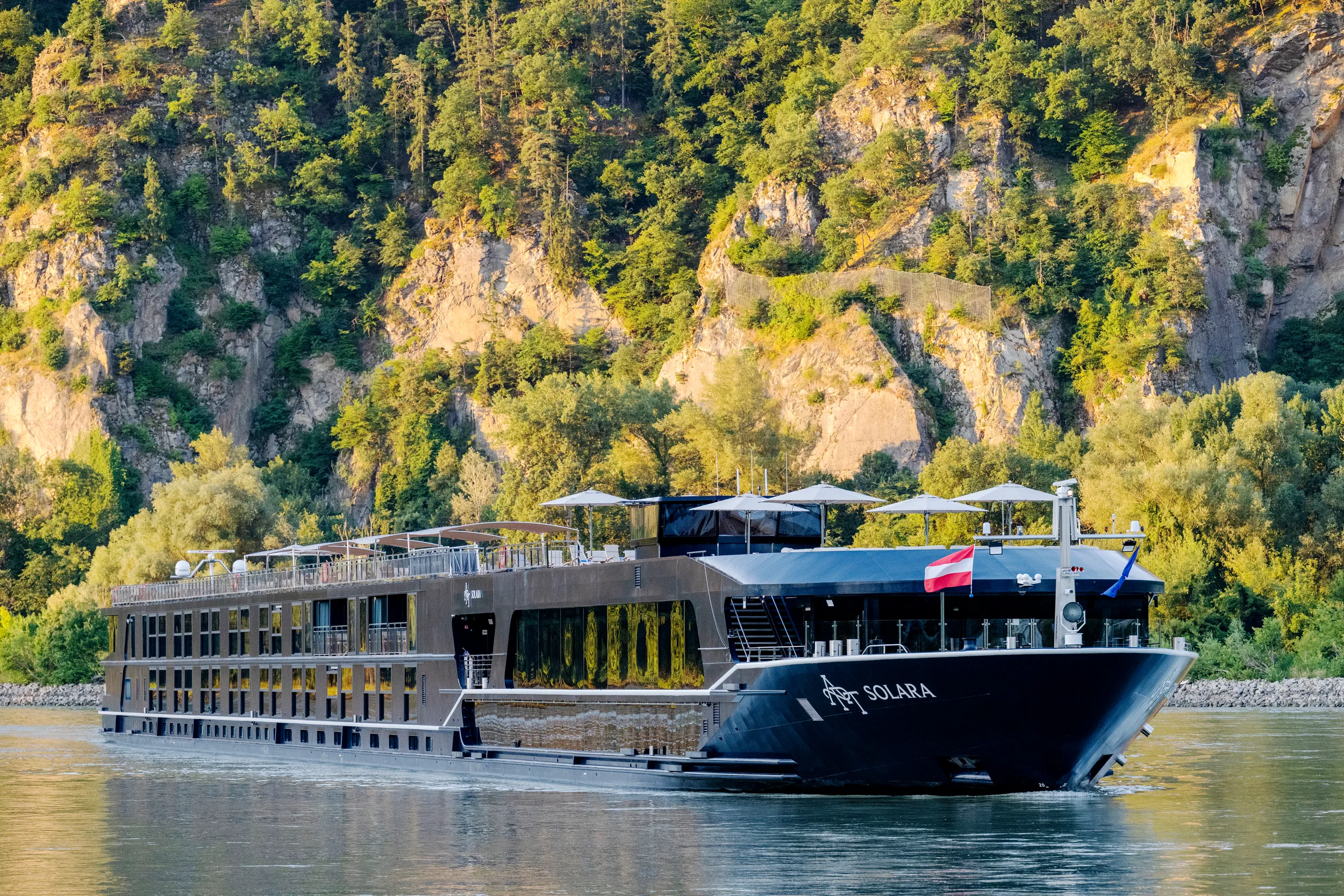
APT Solara on Rhine river

Also in 2025, The APT Travel Group's Travelmarvel brand announced the launch of Travelmarvel Sirius, a Nile River cruise ship that entered service in 2026. In 2026, Travelmarvel launched its newest European river ship, Travelmarvel Rigel, built for the Rhine, Main and Danube rivers, and joining sister vessels Polaris, Capella and Vega.

=== Investment in Europe and the UK ===
In 2011, APT invested in UK-based travel company Noble Caledonia with the Swedish expedition and destination cruise ship experts, Salén Ship Management, which operates luxury small ship cruising and land touring worldwide, with the 114-passenger MS Island Sky. In 2012, the company then bought a sister ship, renaming her as MS Caledonian Sky.

In 2026, The APT Travel Group acquired a majority stake in Rodina Holdings Ltd, the parent company of UK-based solo travel operator One Traveller. The APT Travel Group CEO David Cox and The APT Travel Group Family Principal and Director Lou Tandy (nee McGeary) were appointed as directors of the company alongside Alexander Roberts.

=== Wilderness camps and lodges ===
APT's network of wilderness lodges located in the Kimberley region of Western Australia include Mitchell Falls Wilderness Lodge, Bell Gorge Wilderness Lodge, and the Bungle Bungle wilderness lodge. These camps are situated on Aboriginal land by special agreement with local indigenous communities and are available to both APT tourists and self-drive travellers.

=== Golden Eagle/GW Travel ===
In 2009, APT acquired the majority interest in GW Travel, a provider of long distance luxury rail journeys. Founded by Tim Littler, GW Travel is a company that operates private trains in Russia, Mongolia, China, Tibet, India, Canada and Africa and holds an exclusive lease on the new Golden Eagle Trans-Siberian Express. In 2012, this was renamed to Golden Eagle Luxury Trains (GELT).

=== Murray River Paddlesteamers ===
In 2026, The APT Travel Group acquired a majority stake in Murray River Paddlesteamers, an operator based in Echuca, Victoria. The acquisition included the paddle steamers PS Canberra, PS Emmylou and PS Australian Star.

== The APT Travel Group ==
Australian Pacific Touring is the flagship company for the APT Travel Group, which currently consists of several brands.

- 1996 – Travelmarvel
- 2000 – Botanica World Discoveries
- 2001 – Captains Choice
- 2001 – Croydon Travel
- 2003 – APT Kimberley Wilderness Adventures

=== Sustainability ===
APT Luxury Travel’s network of Kimberley Wilderness Lodges achieved ECO Certification through Ecotourism Australia for the 20th consecutive year in 2026, inducting the company into Ecotourism Australia’s Hall of Fame. APT’s Wilderness Lodges and Kimberley touring program are designed to minimise environmental impact, protect natural and cultural heritage, and support First Nations communities.

In 2026, The APT Travel Group achieved B Corporation Certification, meeting B Lab’s verified standards for social, environmental and governance business practices. Based on the B Impact assessment, The APT Travel Group earned an overall B Impact Score of 87.2.

The APT Travel Group, through its charitable fund OneTomorrow, supports a range of environmental and humanitarian causes across the globe.

=== Awards and recognition ===
APT Luxury Travel has received industry recognition including the Australian Federation of Travel Agents' Most Outstanding Tour Operator – Global award (2023) and Best River Cruise Operator (2015–2019). In 2023, it was also named Best Holiday Operator in the Reader's Digest Quality Service Awards, a consumer-voted award.

In 2025, The APT Travel Group was recognised as one of Deloitte Private’s 2025 Best Managed Companies. The company was also named a finalist in the 2026 Financial Review BOSS Best Places to Work Awards.
