= AAT Kings =

Australian and New Zealand coach tour operator

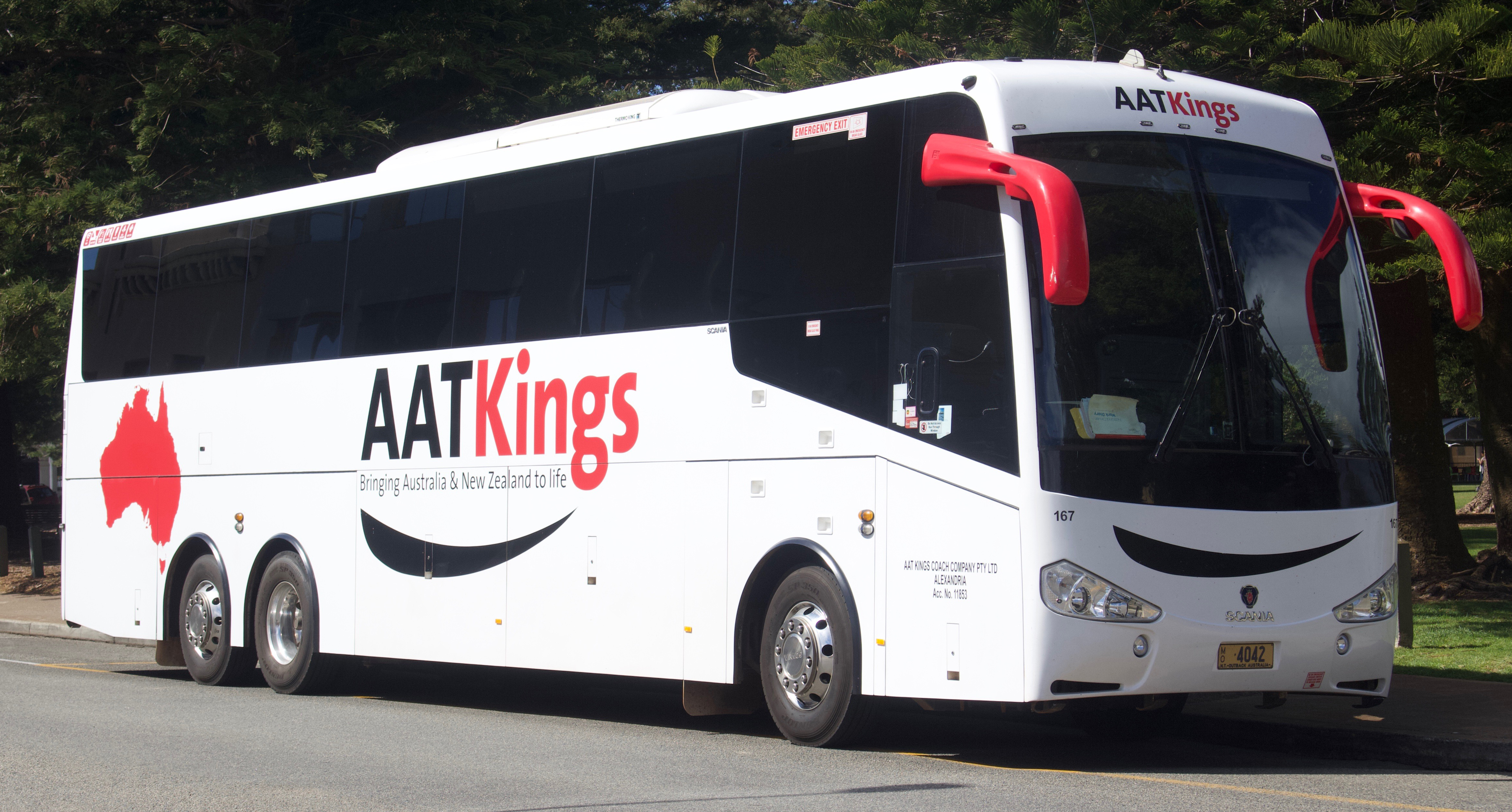
- Scania K440EB coach in Fremantle in September 2018
- Parent: The Travel Corporation
- Founded: 1928
- Headquarters: Head office: Bondi Junction; Coach Company: Botany
- Service area: Australia; New Zealand
- Service type: Tour operator
- Fleet: 70 (February 2016)
- Website: www.aatkings.com

AAT Kings is an Australian and New Zealand coach tour operator offering both short and long distance tours.

== History ==
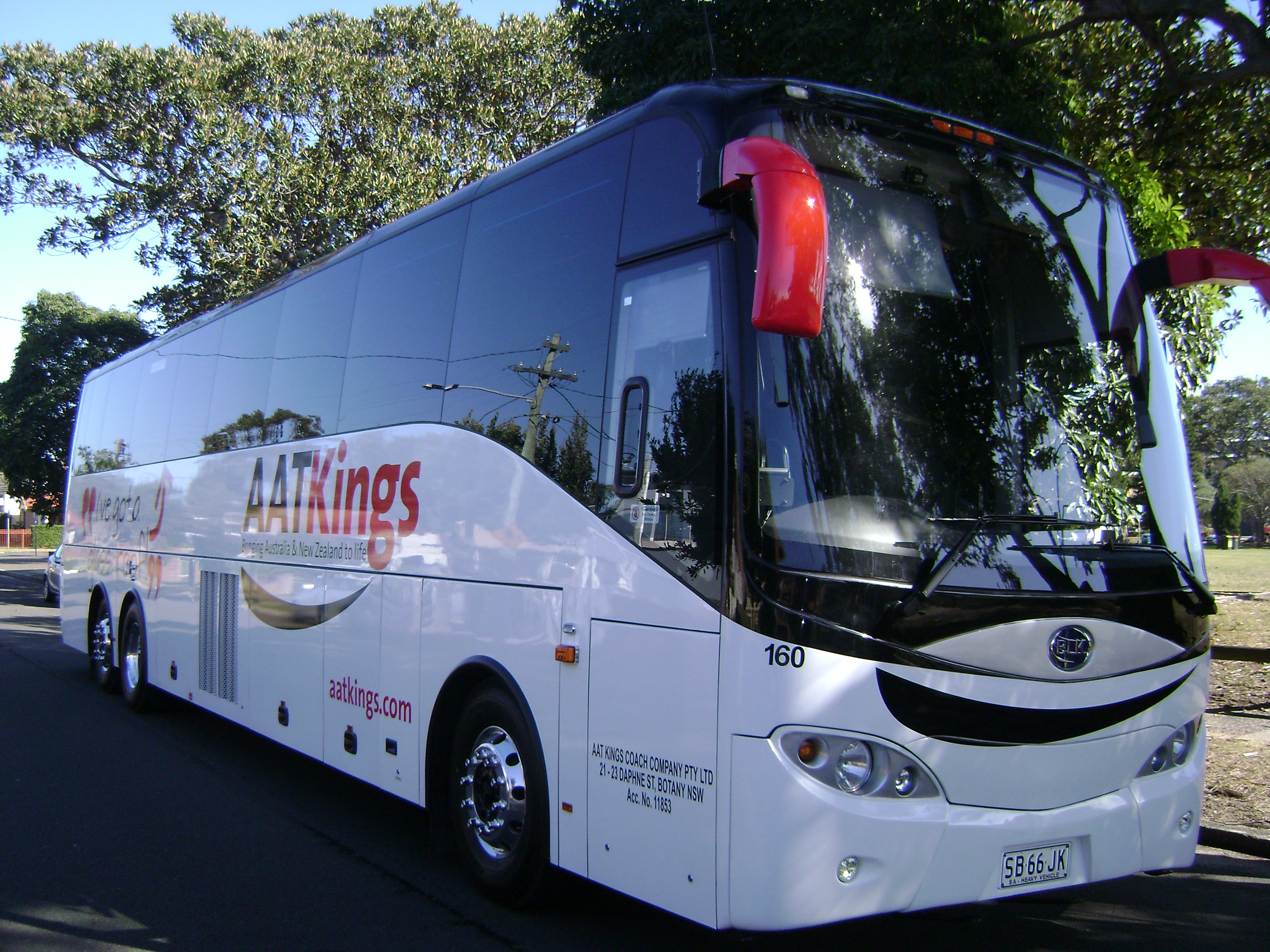
Bonluck coach in Botany in August 2014

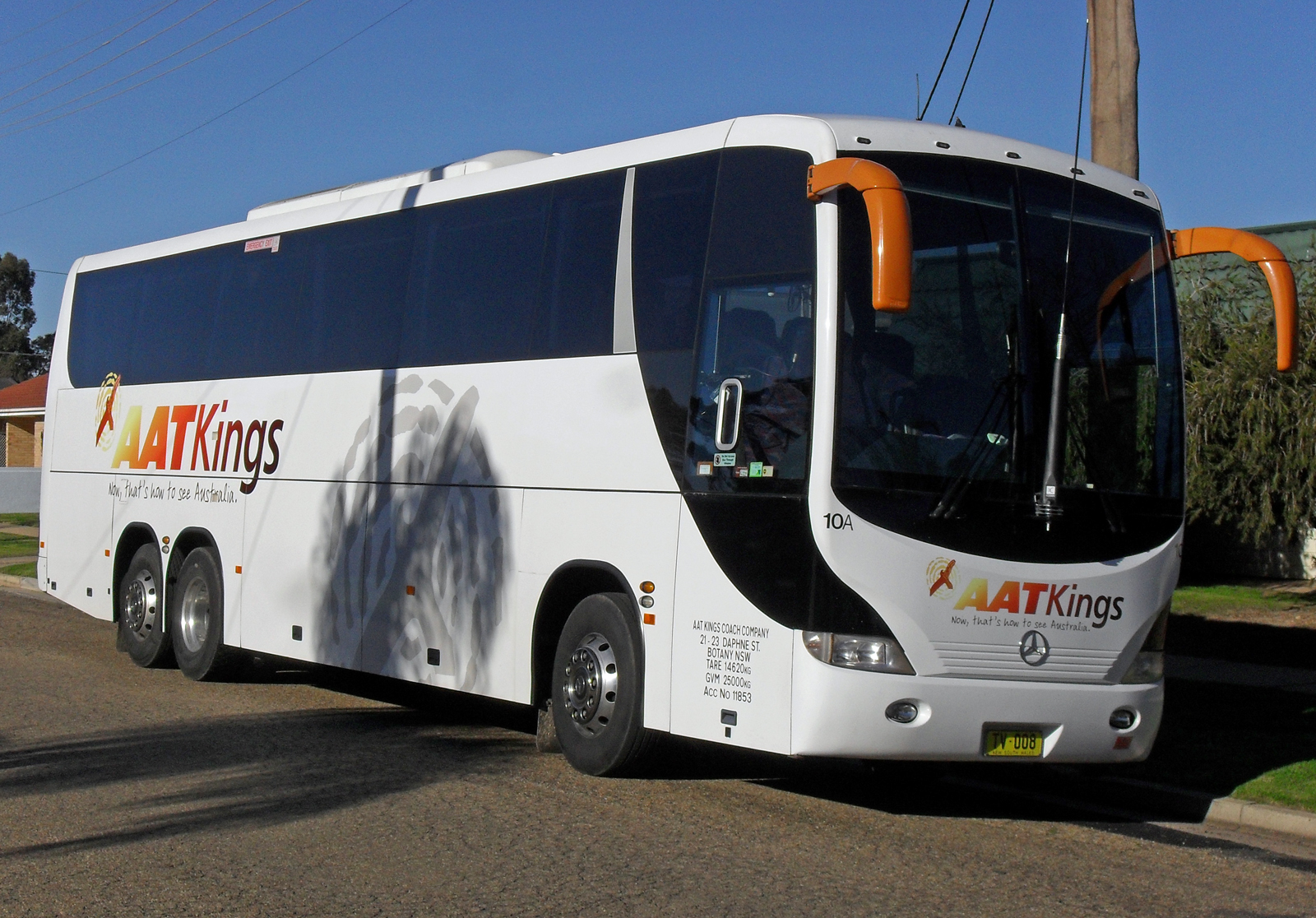
Mills-Tui bodied Mercedes-Benz O500RF in Wagga Wagga in July 2009

AAT Kings history can be traced back to the 1920s when the Pyke family began a car hire business in Sydney. In the 1930s they began to offer guided tours to Katoomba and Jenolan Caves. Tours were initially operated in seven-seater cars, until in 1935 when 14-seater coaches were introduced.

In 1973 Grenda's purchased Blue Line Tourist Coaches in Sydney and a Trans Australia Airlines / Mayne Nickless joint venture formed AAT Coachlines. In July 1975 AAT Coachlines purchased Pykes Tours and Grenda's coach businesses in Sydney and Melbourne.

Meanwhile, in 1967, Bill King formed Bill King's Northern Safaris operating out of Melbourne with two Land Rovers, an ex Army International ambulance and a Denning from his father, who was the proprietor of Coburg-Heidelberg Omnibus Service.

In 1970 King purchased two larger ex Army International 4x4s and two M-series Bedford 4x4s. King later designed and designed his own 18 passenger Desert Cruiser vehicles on Bedford chassis, these were relocated to Alice Springs, and packaged tours were operated in association with Ansett Airlines.

By 1979 Bill King's Northern Safaris was operating 10 vehicles and had four Greyhound coaches on charter. At the same time AAT Coachlines had commenced operations in the Northern Territory with four new Dennings. In 1980 AAT purchased King's business with the tours were marketed as Bill King's Australian Adventure Tours, with King remaining as manager until 1985. Later both operations along with AAT Coachlines were merged to form AAT Kings.

In 1983 AAT Kings was purchased by Mayer Page and Geoff McGeary, proprietors of Australian Pacific Touring. In June 1993 the business was split with Page taking control of AAT Kings, and McGeary Australian Pacific Touring.

In 1997 AAT Kings was sold to The Travel Corporation. In July 2012, AAT Kings purchased Australian Pacific Touring's Day Tours and Shorts Breaks divisions.

In August 2014, AAT Kings purchased a share in Down Under Tours, Cairns.

== Indigenous Culture ==
AAT Kings has forged strong relationships with indigenous communities throughout Australia and New Zealand, including the Anangu people and Uluru Aboriginal Tours in Central Australia, as well as the Tamaki Family Marae on the outskirts of Rotorua, New Zealand. AAT Kings has also partnered with Alice Springs indigenous artist Kathleen Buzzacot and Maruku Arts to create a specially designed Aboriginal artwork featured on all coaches in Central Australia. Bone and pounamu (greenstone) carver, Lance Ngata, from Uawa (Tolaga Bay) and Turangi in New Zealand's North Island has also created exclusive artwork that features on all coaches in New Zealand.

== Fleet ==
In the 1970s the fleet consisted of imported Van Hool bodied coaches. In the 1980s Dennings and later Ansair and Denning bodied Mercedes-Benz O303s were purchased. For outback operations, Centurion Transport Engineering bodied Mercedes-Benz Unimogs were purchased. The livery was originally blue, yellow and orange modified in the 1990s to white with Aboriginal artworks. In 2013, a white with red and black signwriting livery was introduced. As at February 2016, the fleet consisted of 70 vehicles.

== Conservation Projects ==
AAT Kings and parent company The Travel Corporation have partnered with various organisations to help protect unique animals in Australia. AAT Kings has teamed up with Australia Zoo Wildlife Warriors to support the koala rehabilitation project at Australia Zoo's Wildlife Hospital — the country's largest and busiest wildlife facility. They provide Australia Zoo Wildlife Warriors with a substantial donation over two years to support the medical treatment and rehabilitation of koalas at the centre, as well as the building of eco-friendly constructions that will help protect those that are sick and orphaned. Additionally, AAT Kings supports the world's leading research facility for Little Penguins on Phillip Island in Victoria. With a major contribution via the TreadRight Foundation, a new penguin weighbridge will monitor the health of the penguins. AAT Kings also support the conservation of the endangered Tasmanian devil through sponsorship of the Tasmanian devil breeding program at Tasmania Zoo. AAT Kings has adopted two Tasmanian devils already and support the zoo in their efforts to combat the fatal devil facial tumour disease that is affecting Tasmanian devils across Australia.
