= Centurion Transport Engineering =

Former Australian bus builder

- Industry: Bus manufacturing
- Defunct: 1990
- Headquarters: Upfield

Centurion Transport Engineering was an Australian bus bodybuilder in Upfield, Melbourne.

== History ==
Centurion Transport Engineering originally built specialist bodies for transport disabled passengers. In 1980 it began bodying route buses. Originally based in Sunshine it later relocated to Upfield. It bodied over 400 buses including many for the Australian Defence Forces and 4x4 Unimogs for AAT Kings. Centurion ceased operations in 1990.
