= Upfield =

Upfield is a word with several meanings:

- Upfield (company), a margarine and food spreads company, derived from margarine division of Unilever
- Upfield, Victoria, a suburb of Melbourne, Australia
  - Upfield railway station
  - Upfield railway line
  - Upfield bike path
- Arthur Upfield (1890–1964), a detective novelist
- "Upfield", a song by Billy Bragg from the album William Bloke (1996)
