= Jakab Industries =

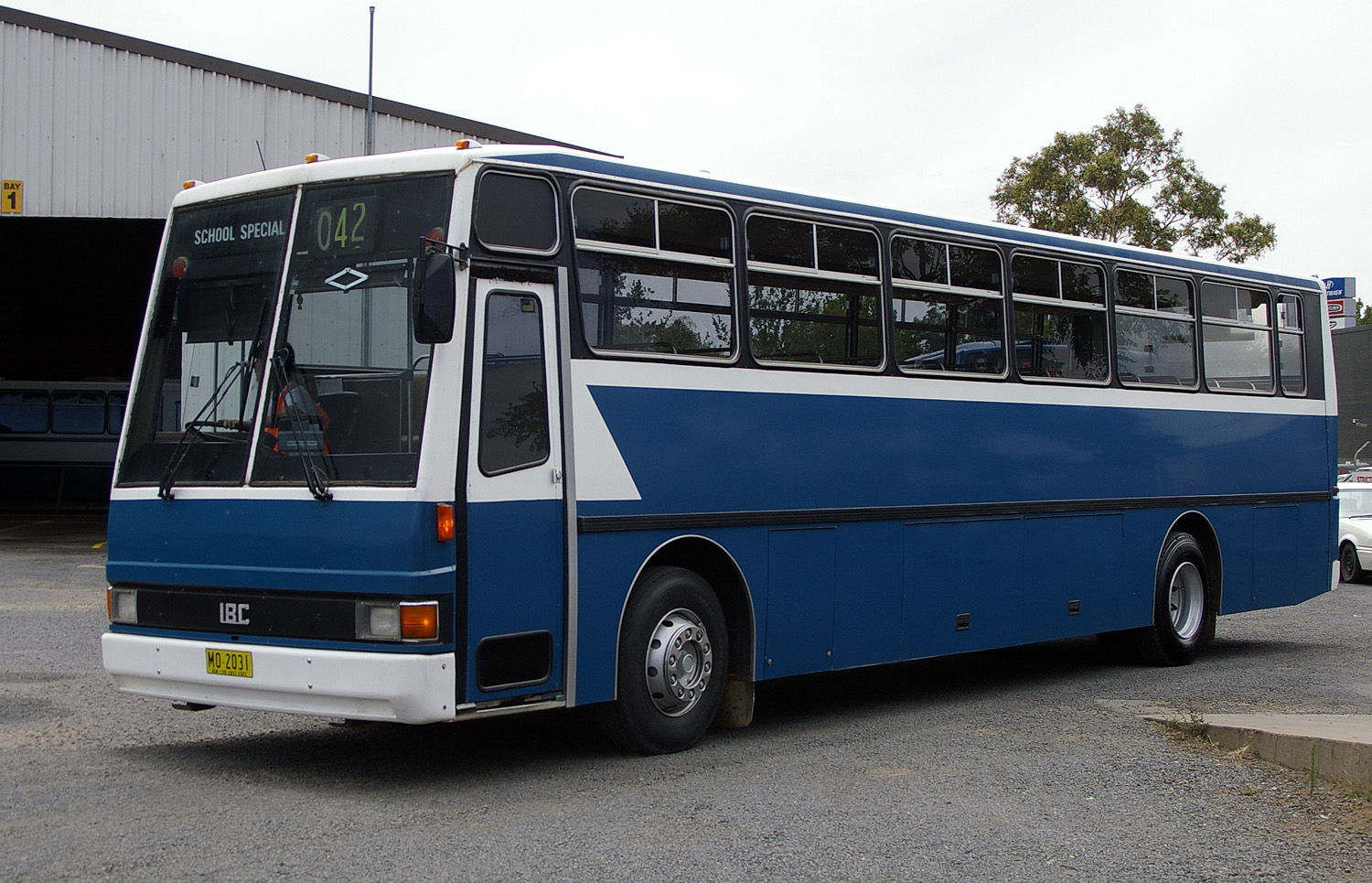
- Fearnes Coaches Jakab-bodied IBC in December 2008
- Industry: Bus manufacturing
- Founded: 1973
- Defunct: 2002
- Headquarters: Tamworth, Australia
- Owner: Karl Jacoby
- Divisions: Phoenix Bus

Jakab Industries was an Australian coachbuilder in Tamworth, New South Wales.

== History ==
Jakab Industries built its first bus body in July 1973, a Ford R226. It mainly made bodies for buses for the defence forces, but also built some for commercial operators, before withdrawing from the market in late 1995. It also built bodies for ambulances and postal vans. In the 1990s it also overhauled Mercedes-Benz and Scania buses for the State Transit Authority.

Following the collapse of Clifford Corporation in 1998, Volvo arranged for Jakab to take over the Ansair plant in Tamworth and complete the work of providing Orana-style bodies for 60 State Transit Authority Volvo B10BLE buses. The subsidiary company set up to do the work was named Phoenix Bus.

Jakab Industries was placed in administration in 2002.
