= IBC (bus manufacturer) =

Australian bus chassis manufacturer

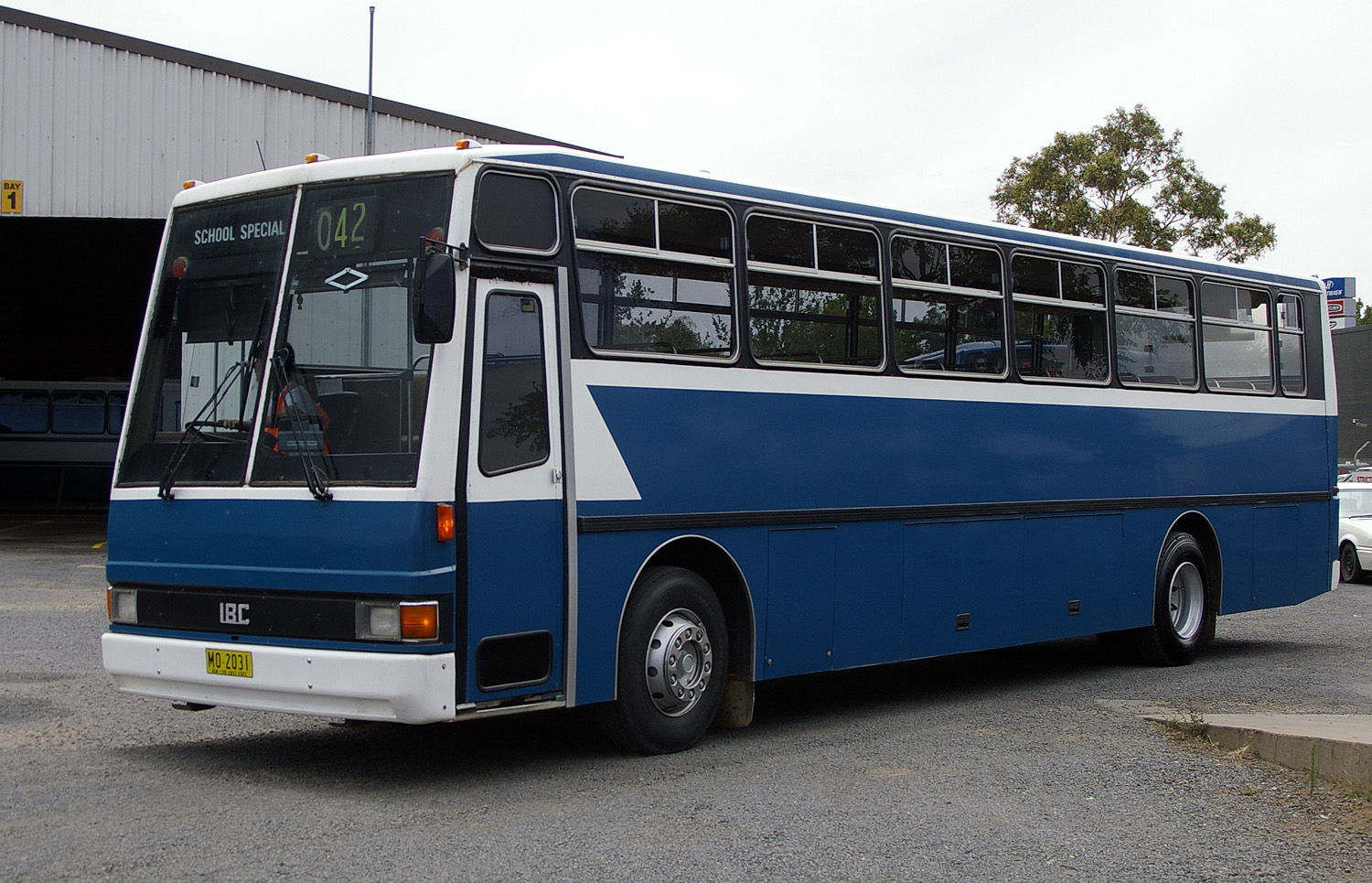
- Fearnes Coaches Jakab bodied IBC in December 2008
- Industry: Bus manufacturing
- Founded: 1963
- Defunct: Oct 1991
- Fate: liquidation
- Headquarters: Brisbane, Australia
- Owners: Ian & Bruce Campbell

IBC was an Australian bus chassis manufacturer based in Brisbane, which operated from 1963 to 1991.

== History ==
IBC was founded in the 1963 by Ian & Bruce Campbell and manufactured bus and coach chassis powered by Caterpillar or General Motors engines. In 1980 it had a chassis bodied by Pressed Metal Corporation to the same style as being delivered to the Urban Transit Authority as a demonstrator. It ceased trading in October 1991.
