= Mills-Tui =

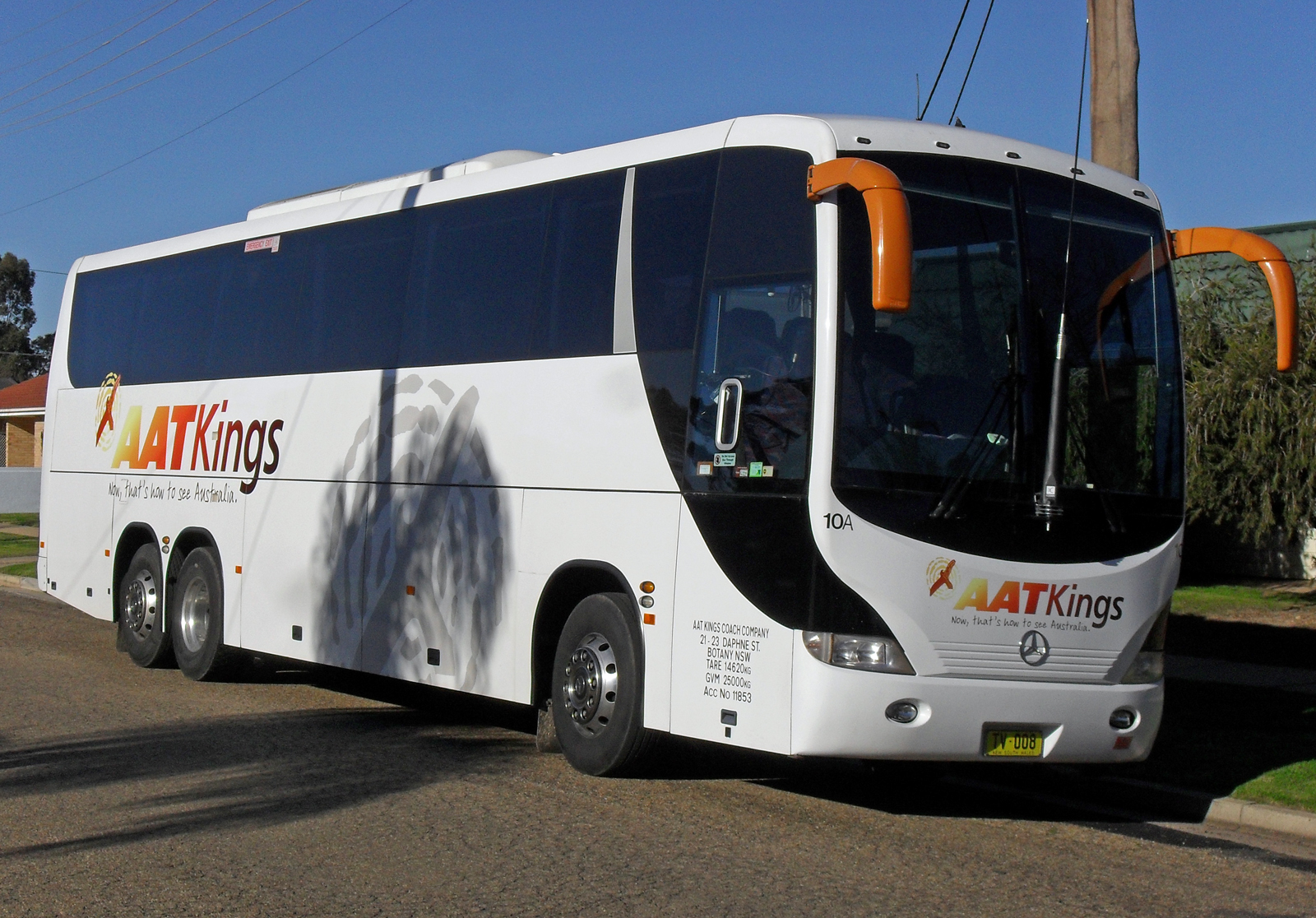
- AAT Kings Mercedes-Benz O500RF-3 in Wagga Wagga in July 2009
- Industry: Bus manufacturing
- Predecessor: Austral; Queensland Coach Company
- Founded: 1999
- Defunct: September 2014
- Headquarters: Narangba, Brisbane, Australia
- Owner: Peter Heffernan; Tjeerd Van Riel
- Number of employees: 80
- Website: www.mills-tui.com.au

Mills-Tui was an Australian manufacturer of heavily specialised vehicles in Narangba, Queensland.

== History ==
Mills-Tui was established in 1999 when the fire appliance business of Austral was purchased from the administrators of Clifford Corporation.

In 2001 it purchased the rights to the Majestic coach and Orbit bus bodies from Queensland Coach Company. AAT Kings and Greyhound Australia were major customers. It also built ambulance bodies.

In September 2014, Mills-Tui ceased trading after being placed in administration.
