= Motor Body Specialists =

- Industry: Bus manufacturing
- Founded: 1964
- Headquarters: Brisbane, Australia

Motor Body Specialists was an Australian bus bodybuilder in Brisbane.

== History ==
Motor Body Specialists was founded in 1964 by five former Athol Hedges employees, initially bodying Bedford and Leyland chassis from premises in Harvey Avenue, Eagle Farm. In January 1965, it signed a deal to distribute Commonwealth Engineering bodied buses in Queensland and northern New South Wales.

In 1983 the business was acquired by Rogers & Son by which time it was concentrating on bodying Isuzu and Hino chassis. In 1998 it was renamed Rogers and moved to Wacol. The bus division closed in May 2000, but the business continued to perform other work.
