= Pressed Metal Corporation =

Australian automotive body building and assembly operation

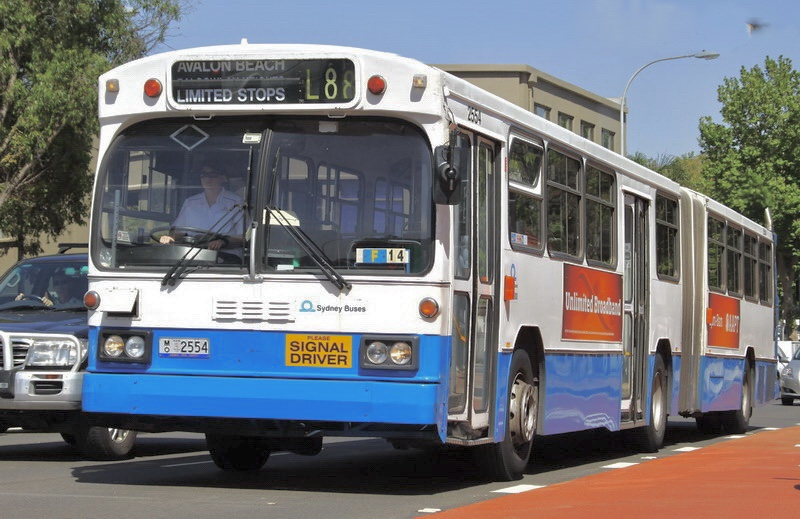
- Sydney Buses Mercedes-Benz O305G in November 2009
- Industry: vehicle body building vehicle assembly bus manufacturing bus refurbishment
- Founded: Late 1930s
- Defunct: April 1999
- Headquarters: Enfield; Revesby
- Parent: Clifford Corporation

Pressed Metal Corporation was an Australian automotive body building and assembly operation based in New South Wales.

== History ==
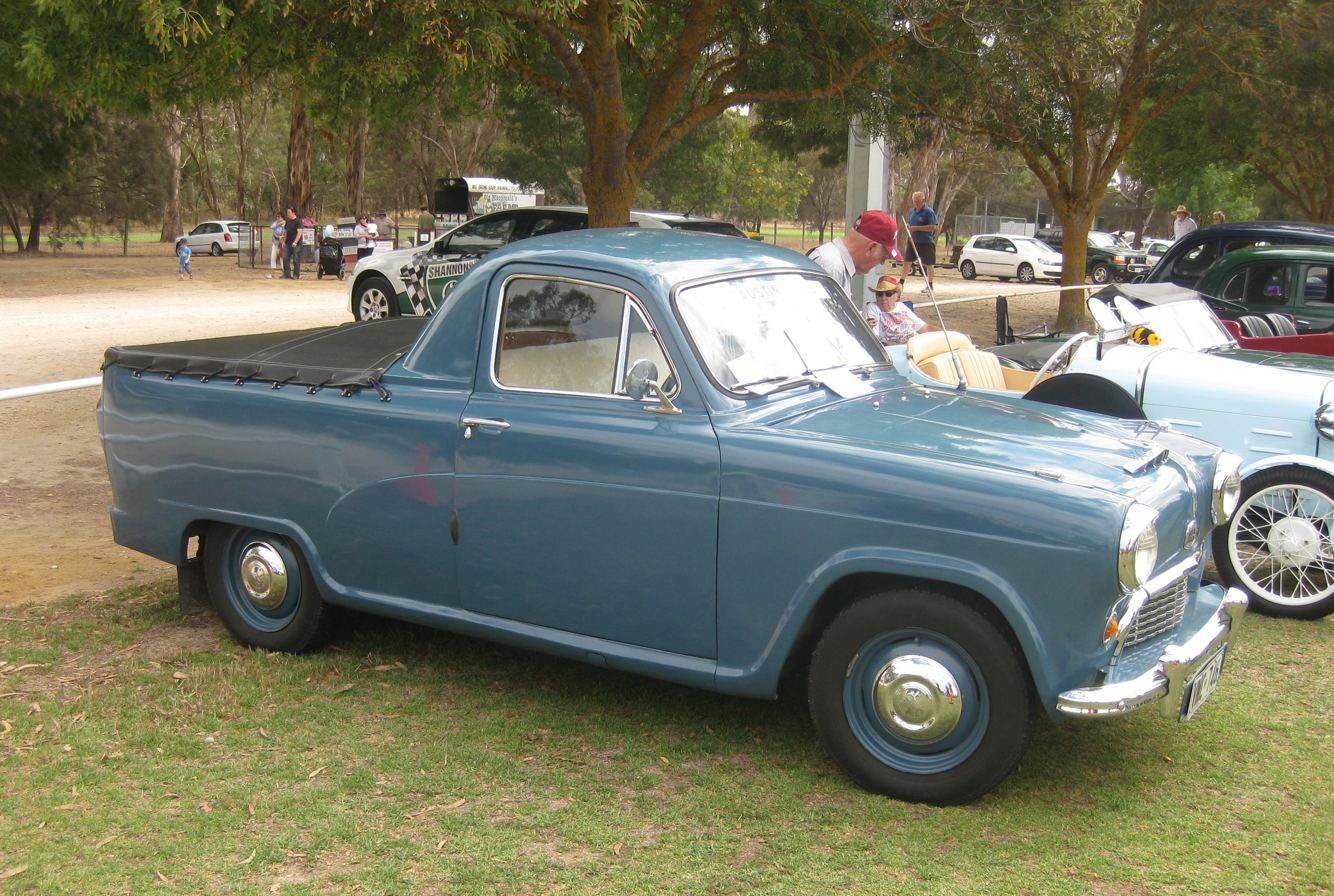
Austin A55 Coupe Utility

Pressed Metal Corporation (PMC) was established in the late 1930s as a joint venture between Larke Hoskins, the Austin agents for New South Wales, and affiliated company Larke, Neave & Carter, the Chrysler distributor in that state. It was created to build motor bodies, at a 22-acre site in the Sydney suburb of Enfield. PMC subsequently assembled various Austin cars and commercial vehicles, however, following the creation of BMC Australia in 1954, much of the assembly of Austin vehicles was taken over by Austin Distributors in Melbourne.

By 1956, the Enfield facility was producing Leyland bus chassis, Land Rovers, Morris commercial vehicles and Austin A40/A50/A55 utilities, with the bodies of the Austins having been designed by PMC itself. PMC subsequently undertook subcontract assembly of various BMC products including Austin-Healey Sprite, Austin Gipsy, MG MGA, MG MGB, MG Midget and Morris J2. Bus body building and assembly was undertaken at PMC's facility in Milperra with the bus assembly operation moved to Revesby in 1965.

An agreement was reached with Datsun Australia in 1966 to assembly Datsun Bluebird 1300s but the arrangement lasted only 18 months.

In 1968, Pressed Metal Corporation was purchased by Leyland Australia, Between May 1967 and October 1990, it bodied 2,289 of the 2,603 buses delivered to the State Transit Authority and its predecessors. It also delivered 3,000 buses to private operators. PMC ceased bodying buses in January 1991 with the last being a Leyland Tiger for St Ives Bus Services. From 1975 the Leyland Mini and Leyland Moke were assembled at Enfield, as were Land Rovers, Leyland National bus chassis and Mercedes-Benz bus chassis.

PMC was included in the sale by JRA Limited (formerly Leyland Australia) of its bus businesses to Clifford Corporation in July 1996. It was converted to a bus refurbishment facility, subsequently closing in April 1999 following Clifford's collapse.

== See also ==
- Pressed Metal Corporation South Australia
