= Pressed Metal Corporation South Australia =

Former Australian bus bodybuilder

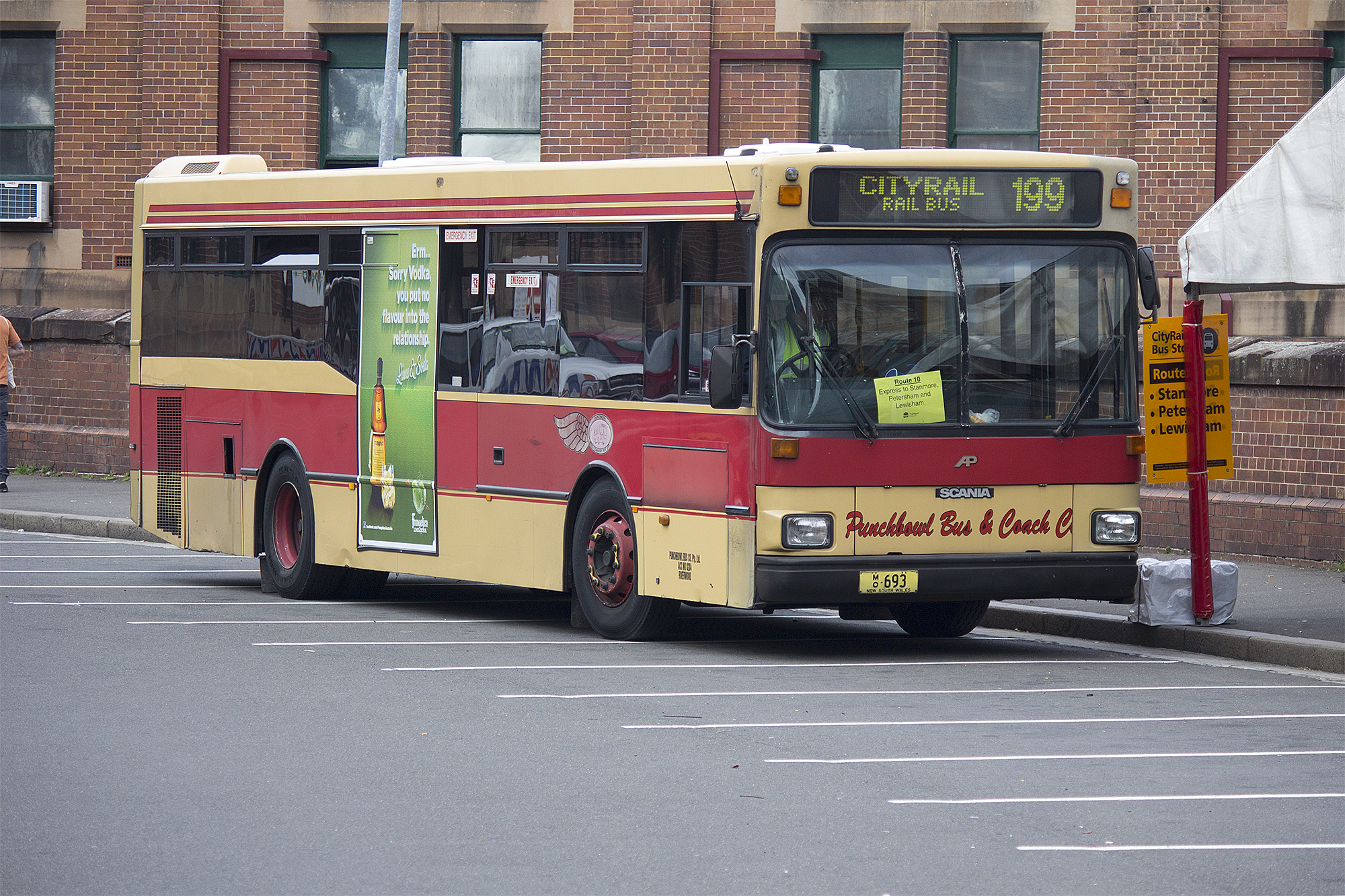
- Punchbowl Bus Company Scania L113CRL at Central station in July 2013
- Industry: Bus manufacturing
- Defunct: 1999
- Successor: Australian Bus Manufacturing
- Headquarters: Park Royal
- Parent: Clifford Corporation

Pressed Metal Corporation South Australia (PMCSA) was an Australian bus bodybuilder based in Royal Park, Adelaide.

== History ==
The business originally formed as Freighter-Lawton Industries being rebranded Freighter Industries in 1963. It was originally based in Seaton.

In 1975 it was sold to Leyland Australia and rebranded PMCSA moving to a new plant at Royal Park in 1976. In 1991 following the closure of Pressed Metal Corporation in Sydney and the consolidation of operations in Adelaide, PMCSA was renamed PMC Australia. PMCSA was included in the sale of Leyland Australia's (by now renamed JRA Limited) bus businesses to Clifford Corporation in July 1996.

Following the collapse of Clifford Corporation, the plant was sold in 1999 to a consortium of Custom Coaches, Jim Bosnjak and John Hewson and rebranded Australian Bus Manufacturing. Custom Coaches assumed full ownership in 2000.

In the 1980s PMCSA also built the Elwood bus chassis with most being sold to Melbourne operators.
