= Austral (bus manufacturer) =

Former Australian bus manufacturer

- Formerly: Domino; Domino Hedges; Domino Denning; Denning, McKinnon & Co
- Industry: Bus manufacturing
- Predecessor: Athol Hedges
- Founded: February 1975
- Founder: Alan Denning; Athol McKinnon; Eddie Wechner; Jim Harwood
- Defunct: November 1998
- Fate: Merged with Denning
- Successor: Austral Denning
- Headquarters: Geebung, Australia
- Parent: Clifford Corporation

Austral, formerly Domino, Domino Denning, Domino Hedges and Denning, McKinnon & Co, was an Australian bus manufacturer in Geebung, Brisbane, Australia. Austral merged with it primary competitor, Denning, in the 1988 and was sold to the Clifford Corporation in 1996 before closing its manufacturing plant in 1998.

== History ==
In March 1974, Domino Industries purchased the bus bodying business of Athol Hedges. In February 1975, former Denning employees Alan Denning, Athol McKinnon, Eddie Wechner and Jim Harwood formed Denning McKinnon & Co to manufacture General Motors powered chassis, having resigned from Denning after Leyland would not sanction development of a coach with air suspension, preferring to stick with leaf springs.

In September 1975 Domino Equipment purchased a 50% shareholding with the business renamed Domino Denning. It was renamed Domino Coaches in 1976.

In 1981 Domino was purchased by Austral. In June 1987, Austral was taken over by the AP Group, controlled by Brisbane car dealer Alan Piper.

In December 1988 Austral was sold to JRA that also owned Denning, Austral's largest rival in the coach market. Both continued to operate separately until 1990 when the Denning plant in Acacia Ridge was closed and production transferred to the Austral factory.

In 1992 production of Denning products was transferred from Acacia Ridge to Austral's Geebung factory with the combined business rebranded Austral Denning. In July 1996, along with JRA's other bus bodybuilding operations, it was sold to the Clifford Corporation and rebranded Austral Pacific. Following the collapse of Clifford Corporation, the plant closed in November 1998.

The design rights to the Austral Pacific Majestic were sold to the Queensland Coach Company. The fire engine design rights were sold to Mills-Tui.

== Products ==
The main product was the Tourmaster, the two axle DC110 and DC113, and the three axle DC122 being built with wheelbases of 11 metres, 11.3 metres and 12.2 metres respectively.

Other products included the HD1 and DD1 high and double deck coaches. Primarily produced as integral vehicles, some bodies were fitted to MAN and Scania chassis. The Starliner was built as a bus. The Austral Denning Highlander succeeded the Tourmaster.

It also produced fire engines.
