= Upfield, Victoria =

Locality in Victoria, Melbourne, Australia

Coordinates: 37°39′59″S 144°56′48″E

Upfield is a small residential and industrial locality 17 km away from the central business district in the northern suburbs of Melbourne, Victoria, Australia situated in the suburb of Campbellfield. It is in the local government area of the City of Hume. Some say the name is descriptive of the area's open country. It may also be a reference to Arthur Upfield, the author, who praised the area.

In 1956 the Ford motor car factory was begun on land between the Hume Highway and the railway line from Coburg to Somerton (now Roxburgh Park). The State Government constructed a railway station (Upfield), and the line was electrified in 1959. South of the Ford factory housing was built and a high school opened in 1968. The Campbellfield Primary School was nearby, but another primary school (Upfield) was opened in 1970 and superseded the Campbellfield site in 1992.

A small shopping centre and post office are near the station. Immediately west of Upfield is the larger residential area of Dallas as well as Coolaroo.

== Transport ==
Upfield station, terminus of all services run by Metro Trains Melbourne on the Upfield line provides the main public transport link into the suburb, with trains to the city every 20 minutes at most times, and every 30 minutes in the evening until midnight.

- 531: Upfield – Coburg North via Fawkner station, Gowrie station (Monday to Friday), operated by CDC Melbourne
- 532: Craigieburn – Broadmeadows via Upfield station, Broadmeadows Central (daily), operated by CDC Melbourne
- 540: Upfield – Broadmeadows (daily), perated by Dysons
