= Ansair =

Australian bus body manufacturer

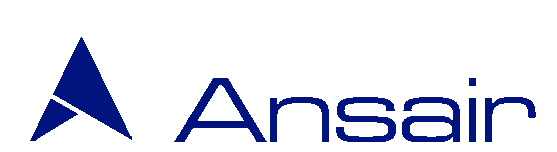

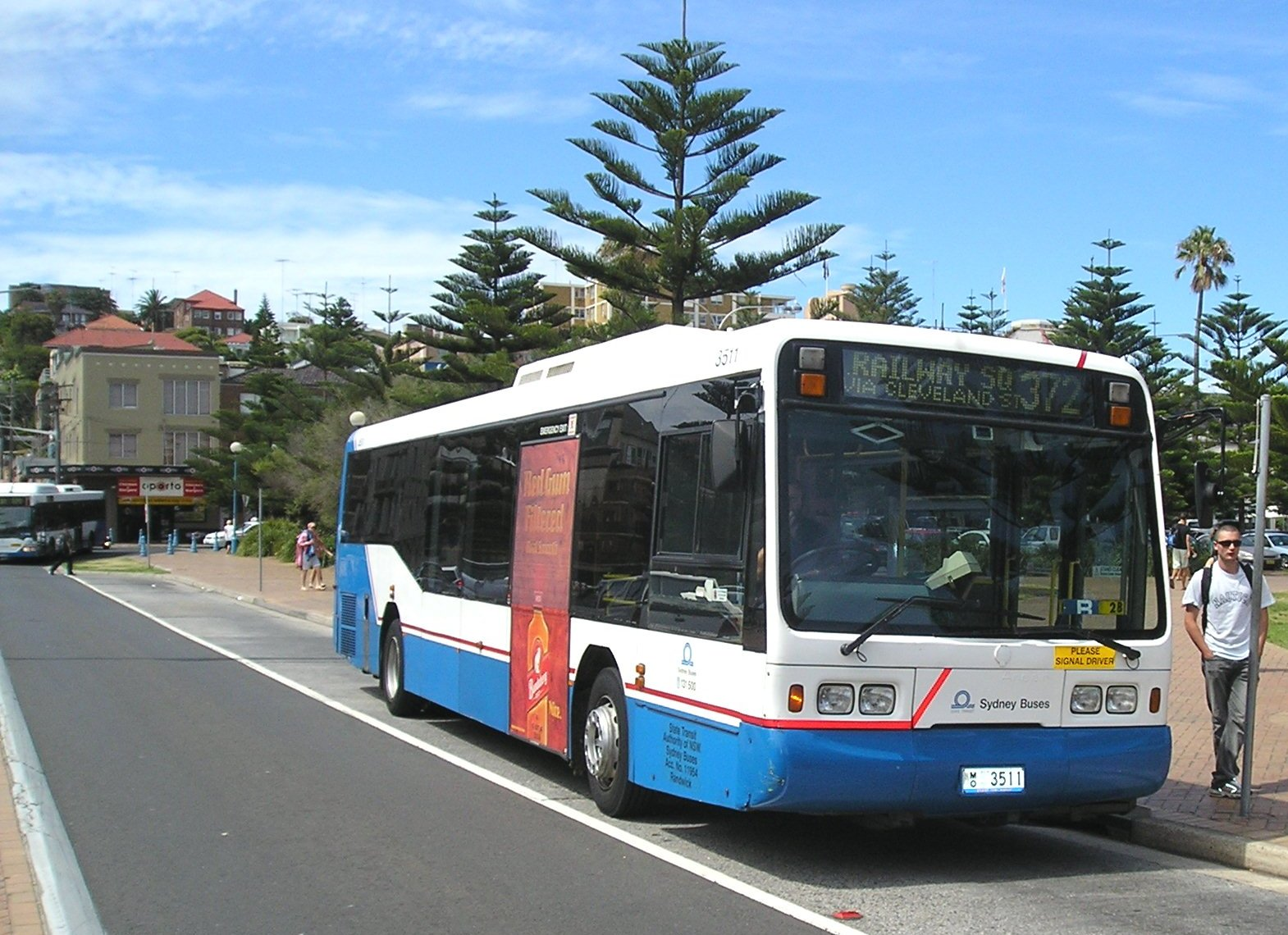
- Sydney Buses Scania L113CRL at Coogee Beach in September 2011
- Industry: Bus manufacturing
- Founded: 1945
- Founder: Reg Ansett
- Defunct: November 1998 [Company operations carried out by successors until 2002.]
- Fate: Collapsed, acquired by Clifford Corporation, who also collapsed a year later, and absorbed into Jakab manufacturing under Phoenix Bus brand.
- Successor: Austral Pacific; Phoenix Bus (Jakab Industries)
- Headquarters: Tullamarine, Australia
- Number of locations: 3 manufacturing factories (1995); Kingston; Tamworth; Tullamarine
- Products: Ansair low and high floor public transport buses, midi to regular to large capacity buses.
- Production output: Government Orders: 465 buses (2000); Private Orders: 434 buses (2001)
- Number of employees: 475
- Parent: Clifford Corporation

Ansair was an Australian bus bodybuilder owned by Ansett Transport Industries and later the Clifford Corporation.

== History ==
Ansair was founded by Reg Ansett in 1945 at Tullamarine, to make bodies for his Ansett Pioneer coaches, as well as manufacture aircraft components for Ansett Airways. It also provided bus bodies for other operators.

In 1987, a plant opened in Kingston, Tasmania, to make bodies for Scania buses used by Metro Tasmania and, in January 1993, a plant opened at East-West Airlines' former Tamworth Airport maintenance facility to make bodies for Scanias used by Sydney Buses.

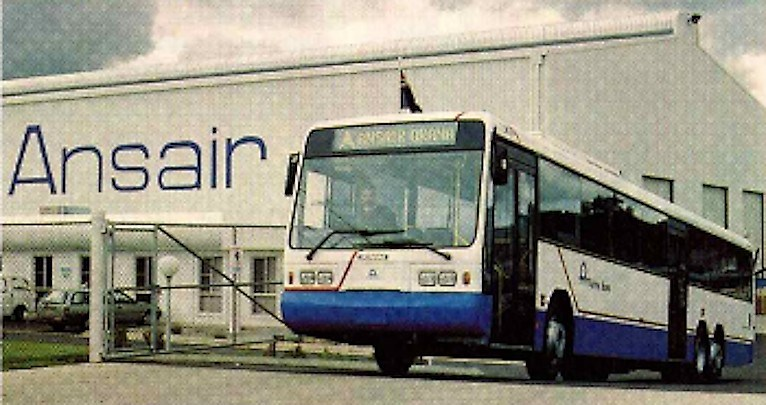
Sydney Buses bus 3430 seen brand new, rolling off the manufacturing floor ready for delivery to Sydney, in early 1993.

In August 1995, Ansett Transport Industries sold Ansair to the Clifford Corporation. In September 1995, the Kingston plant closed.

In 1996, more chassis options were explored by Ansair, experimenting with MAN and Mercedes Benz systems on Ansair low floor bus models, as part of the order requested by Sydney Buses. These variants were limited, and were manufactured at the Tullamarine plant. Tullamarine was the plant that took on the more-so unusual builds, leaving the other plants with the bulk ordered Scania and Volvo builds.

In 1997, the Tullamarine manufacturing plant was closed. Ansair ceased trading in November 1998 when the Clifford Corporation collapsed; leaving 140 undelivered, yet incomplete, government and private buses ordered by various bus companies. Austral Pacific was appointed to take over the operations of what was left of Ansair; and to get back on track and complete the remaining buses in manufacturing. Whilst this took place, the decision was made in December 1998 to close the Geebung plant. The only remaining plant still in operation after this was Tamworth, with the organization only constructing Volvo B10BLE Ansair Orana buses, under the Austral Pacific brand. In April 1999, Austral Pacific collapsed, once again halting operations and manufacturing at the company's only leftover base, Tamworth.

The Tamworth plant was reopened by Jakab Industries in June 1999 to complete a late, yet outstanding order of Volvo B10BLEs for Sydney Buses, under the Phoenix Bus brand. Once the order was completed for the state government, Jakab wound up the Tamworth plant's operations, and sold the site and returned its operations back into Queensland.

== Government Order ==
Below is a status table of all NSW Government ordered Ansair buses for Sydney/Newcastle Buses.

STA FLEET NO#.	CHASSIS	MODEL	CHASSIS NUMBER	BODY NO#.	PLACE OF MANUFACTURE
3405	MERCEDES BENZ	O405N	WDB35743621076764	MB2759	MELBOURNE
3406	MERCEDES BENZ	O405N	WDB35743621081324	MB2760	MELBOURNE
3408	SCANIA	K113TRBL	1815835	PMCA 2065	PMC ADELAIDE
3409	SCANIA	L113CRB CNG	1819842	S2116	MELBOURNE
3410	SCANIA	L113CRB CNG	1819843	S2117	MELBOURNE
3411	SCANIA	L113TRBL	1820780	S2401	MELBOURNE
3412	SCANIA	L113TRBL	1820779	S2402	MELBOURNE
3413	SCANIA	L113TRBL	1821532	S2403	MELBOURNE
3414	SCANIA	L113TRBL	1821533	S2404	MELBOURNE
3415	SCANIA	L113TRBL	1821534	S2405	MELBOURNE
3416	SCANIA	L113TRBL	1821537	S2406	MELBOURNE
3417	SCANIA	L113TRBL	1821535	S2407	MELBOURNE
3418	SCANIA	L113TRBL	1821536	S2408	MELBOURNE
3419	SCANIA	L113TRBL	1821661	S2409	MELBOURNE
3420	SCANIA	L113TRBL	1821663	S2411	MELBOURNE
3421	SCANIA	L113TRBL	1821664	S2412	MELBOURNE
3422	SCANIA	L113TRBL	1821662	S2410	MELBOURNE
3423	SCANIA	L113TRBL	1821764	S2413	MELBOURNE
3424	SCANIA	L113TRBL	1821765	S2414	MELBOURNE
3425	SCANIA	L113TRBL	1821853	S2415	MELBOURNE
3426	SCANIA	L113TRBL	1821854	S2416	MELBOURNE
3427	SCANIA	L113TRBL	1821855	S2417	MELBOURNE
3428	SCANIA	L113TRBL	1821856	S2418	MELBOURNE
3429	SCANIA	L113TRBL	1821857	S2419	MELBOURNE
3430	SCANIA	L113TRBL	1821858	S2420	MELBOURNE
3431	SCANIA	L113TRBL	1821665	S2421	TAMWORTH
3432	SCANIA	L113TRBL	1821666	S2422	TAMWORTH
3433	SCANIA	L113TRBL	1821766	S2423	TAMWORTH
3434	SCANIA	L113TRBL	1821767	S2424	TAMWORTH
3435	SCANIA	L113TRBL	1821768	S2425	TAMWORTH
3436	SCANIA	L113TRBL	1821769	S2426	TAMWORTH
3437	SCANIA	L113TRBL	1821951	S2427	MELBOURNE
3438	SCANIA	L113TRBL	1821952	S2428	MELBOURNE
3439	SCANIA	L113TRBL	1821953	S2429	MELBOURNE
3440	SCANIA	L113TRBL	1821954	S2430	MELBOURNE
3441	SCANIA	L113TRBL	1821955	S2431	MELBOURNE
3442	SCANIA	L113TRBL	1821956	S2432	MELBOURNE
3443	SCANIA	L113TRBL	1822160	S2433	TAMWORTH
3444	SCANIA	L113TRBL	1822161	S2434	TAMWORTH
3445	SCANIA	L113TRBL	1822162	S2435	TAMWORTH
3446	SCANIA	L113TRBL	1822163	S2436	TAMWORTH
3447	SCANIA	L113TRBL	1822164	S2437	TAMWORTH
3448	SCANIA	L113TRBL	1822165	S2438	TAMWORTH
3449	SCANIA	L113TRBL	1822247	S2439	TAMWORTH
3450	SCANIA	L113TRBL	1822248	S2440	TAMWORTH
3451	SCANIA	L113TRBL	1822249	S2441	TAMWORTH
3452	SCANIA	L113TRBL	1822250	S2442	TAMWORTH
3453	SCANIA	L113TRBL	1822251	S2443	TAMWORTH
3454	SCANIA	L113TRBL	1822252	S2444	TAMWORTH
3455	SCANIA	L113TRBL	1822366	S2445	TAMWORTH
3456	SCANIA	L113TRBL	1822367	S2446	TAMWORTH
3457	SCANIA	L113TRBL	1822368	S2447	TAMWORTH
3458	SCANIA	L113TRBL	1822369	S2448	TAMWORTH
3459	SCANIA	L113TRBL	1822370	S2449	TAMWORTH
3460	SCANIA	L113TRBL	1822371	S2450	TAMWORTH
3461	SCANIA	L113CRB CNG	1822588	S2451	MELBOURNE
3462	SCANIA	L113CRB CNG	1822587	S2452	TAMWORTH
3463	SCANIA	L113CRB CNG	1822586	S2453	MELBOURNE
3464	SCANIA	L113CRB CNG	1822585	S2454	TAMWORTH
3465	SCANIA	L113CRB CNG	1822584	S2455	MELBOURNE
3466	SCANIA	L113CRB CNG	1822583	S2456	TAMWORTH
3467	SCANIA	L113CRB CNG	1822687	S2457	TAMWORTH
3468	SCANIA	L113CRB CNG	1822688	S2458	TAMWORTH
3469	SCANIA	L113CRB CNG	1822689	S2459	TAMWORTH
3470	SCANIA	L113CRB CNG	1822690	S2460	TAMWORTH
3471	SCANIA	L113CRB CNG	1822691	S2461	TAMWORTH
3472	SCANIA	L113CRB CNG	1822692	S2462	TAMWORTH
3473	SCANIA	L113CRB CNG	1822790	S2463	TAMWORTH
3474	SCANIA	L113CRB CNG	1822791	S2464	TAMWORTH
3475	SCANIA	L113CRB CNG	1822792	S2465	TAMWORTH
3476	SCANIA	L113CRB CNG	1822793	S2466	TAMWORTH
3477	SCANIA	L113CRB CNG	1822794	S2467	TAMWORTH
3478	SCANIA	L113CRB CNG	1822795	S2468	TAMWORTH
3479	SCANIA	L113CRB CNG	1822902	S2469	TAMWORTH
3480	SCANIA	L113CRB CNG	1822903	S2470	TAMWORTH
3481	SCANIA	L113CRB CNG	1822904	S2471	TAMWORTH
3482	SCANIA	L113CRB CNG	1822905	S2472	TAMWORTH
3483	SCANIA	L113CRB CNG	1822906	S2473	TAMWORTH
3484	SCANIA	L113CRB CNG	1822907	S2474	TAMWORTH
3485	SCANIA	L113CRB CNG	1823130	S2475	TAMWORTH
3486	SCANIA	L113CRB CNG	1823131	S2476	TAMWORTH
3487	SCANIA	L113CRB CNG	1823132	S2477	TAMWORTH
3488	SCANIA	L113CRB CNG	1823133	S2478	TAMWORTH
3489	SCANIA	L113CRB CNG	1823134	S2479	TAMWORTH
3490	SCANIA	L113CRB CNG	1823135	S2480	TAMWORTH
3491	SCANIA	L113CRB CNG	1823397	S2481	TAMWORTH
3492	SCANIA	L113CRB CNG	1823398	S2482	TAMWORTH
3493	SCANIA	L113CRB CNG	1823399	S2483	TAMWORTH
3494	SCANIA	L113CRB CNG	1823400	S2484	TAMWORTH
3495	SCANIA	L113CRB CNG	1823401	S2485	TAMWORTH
3496	SCANIA	L113CRB CNG	1823402	S2486	TAMWORTH
3497	SCANIA	L113CRB CNG	1823403	S2487	TAMWORTH
3498	SCANIA	L113CRB CNG	1823404	S2488	TAMWORTH
3499	SCANIA	L113CRB CNG	1823405	S2489	TAMWORTH
3500	SCANIA	L113CRB CNG	1823406	S2490	TAMWORTH
3501	SCANIA	L113CRB CNG	1823407	S2491	TAMWORTH
3502	SCANIA	L113CRB CNG	1823408	S2492	TAMWORTH
3503	SCANIA	L113CRB CNG	1823628	S2493	TAMWORTH
3504	SCANIA	L113CRB CNG	1823629	S2494	TAMWORTH
3505	SCANIA	L113CRB CNG	1823630	S2495	TAMWORTH
3506	SCANIA	L113CRB CNG	1823631	S2496	TAMWORTH
3507	SCANIA	L113CRB CNG	1823632	S2497	TAMWORTH
3508	SCANIA	L113CRB CNG	1823633	S2498	TAMWORTH
3509	SCANIA	L113CRB CNG	1823634	S2499	TAMWORTH
3510	SCANIA	L113CRB CNG	1823635	S2500	TAMWORTH
3511	SCANIA	L113CRL	1823170	S2350	MELBOURNE
3512	SCANIA	L113CRB CNG	1822280	S2501	TAMWORTH
3513	SCANIA	L113CRB CNG	1823636	S2502	TAMWORTH
3514	SCANIA	L113CRB CNG	1823953	S2503	TAMWORTH
3515	SCANIA	L113CRB CNG	1823954	S2504	TAMWORTH
3516	SCANIA	L113CRB CNG	1823955	S2505	TAMWORTH
3517	SCANIA	L113CRB CNG	1823956	S2506	TAMWORTH
3518	SCANIA	L113CRB CNG	1823957	S2507	TAMWORTH
3519	SCANIA	L113CRB CNG	1823958	S2508	TAMWORTH
3520	SCANIA	L113CRB CNG	1824099	S2509	TAMWORTH
3621	SCANIA	L113CRB CNG	1824100	S2510	TAMWORTH
3622	SCANIA	L113CRB CNG	1824101	S2511	TAMWORTH
3623	SCANIA	L113CRB CNG	1824102	S2512	TAMWORTH
3624	SCANIA	L113CRB CNG	1824103	S2513	TAMWORTH
3625	SCANIA	L113CRB CNG	1824104	S2514	TAMWORTH
3626	SCANIA	L113CRB CNG	1824206	S2515	TAMWORTH
3627	SCANIA	L113CRB CNG	1824207	S2516	TAMWORTH
3628	SCANIA	L113CRB CNG	1824208	S2517	TAMWORTH
3629	SCANIA	L113CRB CNG	1824209	S2518	TAMWORTH
3630	SCANIA	L113CRB CNG	1824210	S2519	TAMWORTH
3631	SCANIA	L113CRB CNG	1824211	S2520	TAMWORTH
3632	SCANIA	L113CRB CNG	1824349	S2521	TAMWORTH
3633	SCANIA	L113CRB CNG	1824350	S2522	TAMWORTH
3634	SCANIA	L113CRB CNG	1824351	S2523	TAMWORTH
3635	SCANIA	L113CRB CNG	1824352	S2524	TAMWORTH
3636	SCANIA	L113CRB CNG	1824353	S2525	TAMWORTH
3637	SCANIA	L113CRB CNG	1824354	S2526	TAMWORTH
3638	SCANIA	L113CRB CNG	1824691	S2527	TAMWORTH
3639	SCANIA	L113CRB CNG	1824692	S2528	TAMWORTH
3640	SCANIA	L113CRB CNG	1824693	S2529	TAMWORTH
3641	SCANIA	L113CRB CNG	1824694	S2530	TAMWORTH
3642	SCANIA	L113CRB CNG	1824695	S2531	TAMWORTH
3643	SCANIA	L113CRB CNG	1824696	S2532	TAMWORTH
3644	SCANIA	L113CRB CNG	1824856	S2533	TAMWORTH
3645	SCANIA	L113CRB CNG	1824857	S2534	TAMWORTH
3646	SCANIA	L113CRB CNG	1824858	S2535	TAMWORTH
3647	SCANIA	L113CRB CNG	1824859	S2536	TAMWORTH
3648	SCANIA	L113CRB CNG	1824860	S2537	TAMWORTH
3649	SCANIA	L113CRB CNG	1824861	S2538	TAMWORTH
3650	SCANIA	L113CRB CNG	1825273	S2539	TAMWORTH
3651	SCANIA	L113CRB CNG	1825274	S2540	TAMWORTH
3652	SCANIA	L113CRB CNG	1825275	S2541	TAMWORTH
3653	SCANIA	L113CRB CNG	1825276	S2542	TAMWORTH
3654	SCANIA	L113CRB CNG	1825277	S2543	TAMWORTH
3655	SCANIA	L113CRB CNG	1825278	S2544	TAMWORTH
3656	SCANIA	L113CRB CNG	1825520	S2545	TAMWORTH
3657	SCANIA	L113CRB CNG	1825521	S2546	TAMWORTH
3658	SCANIA	L113CRB CNG	1825522	S2547	TAMWORTH
3659	SCANIA	L113CRB CNG	1825523	S2548	TAMWORTH
3660	SCANIA	L113CRB CNG	1825524	S2549	TAMWORTH
3661	SCANIA	L113CRB CNG	1825525	S2550	TAMWORTH
3662	MAN	11-220 HOCL/R-NM	752 0398	M2771	MELBOURNE
3663	MAN	11-220 HOCL/R-NM	752 0399	M2772	MELBOURNE
3664	MAN	11-220 HOCL/R-NM	752 0400	M2773	MELBOURNE
3665	MAN	11-220 HOCL/R-NM	752 0401	M2774	MELBOURNE
3666	MAN	11-220 HOCL/R-NM	752 0402	M2775	MELBOURNE
3667	MAN	11-220 HOCL/R-NM	752 0403	M2776	MELBOURNE
3668	MAN	11-220 HOCL/R-NM	752 0418	M2777	MELBOURNE
3669	MAN	11-220 HOCL/R-NM	752 0419	M2778	MELBOURNE
3670	MAN	11-220 HOCL/R-NM	752 0420	M2779	MELBOURNE
3671	MAN	11-220 HOCL/R-NM	752 0421	M2780	MELBOURNE
3672	MAN	11-220 HOCL/R-NM	752 0422	M2781	MELBOURNE
3673	MAN	11-220 HOCL/R-NM	752 0423	M2782	MELBOURNE
3674	MAN	11-220 HOCL/R-NM	752 0436	M2783	MELBOURNE
3675	MAN	11-220 HOCL/R-NM	752 0437	M2784	MELBOURNE
3676	MAN	11-220 HOCL/R-NM	752 0438	M2785	MELBOURNE
3677	MAN	11-220 HOCL/R-NM	752 0439	M2786	MELBOURNE
3678	MAN	11-220 HOCL/R-NM	752 0440	M2787	MELBOURNE
3679	MAN	11-220 HOCL/R-NM	752 0441	M2788	MELBOURNE
3680	MAN	11-220 HOCL/R-NM	752 0446	M2789	MELBOURNE
3681	MAN	11-220 HOCL/R-NM	752 0447	M2790	MELBOURNE
3682	MAN	11-220 HOCL/R-NM	752 0448	M2791	MELBOURNE
3683	MAN	11-220 HOCL/R-NM	752 0449	M2792	MELBOURNE
3684	MAN	11-220 HOCL/R-NM	752 0450	M2793	MELBOURNE
3685	MAN	11-220 HOCL/R-NM	752 0451	M2794	MELBOURNE
3686	MAN	11-220 HOCL/R-NM	752 0479	M2795	MELBOURNE
3687	MAN	11-220 HOCL/R-NM	752 0480	M2796	MELBOURNE
3688	MAN	11-220 HOCL/R-NM	752 0481	M2797	MELBOURNE
3689	MAN	11-220 HOCL/R-NM	752 0482	M2798	MELBOURNE
3690	MAN	11-220 HOCL/R-NM	752 0483	M2799	MELBOURNE
3691	MAN	11-220 HOCL/R-NM	752 0484	M2800	MELBOURNE
3692	SCANIA	L113CRL	1825912	S2551	TAMWORTH
3693	SCANIA	L113CRL	1825913	S2552	TAMWORTH
3694	SCANIA	L113CRL	1825914	S2553	TAMWORTH
3695	SCANIA	L113CRL	1825915	S2557	MELBOURNE
3696	SCANIA	L113CRL	1825916	S2554	TAMWORTH
3697	SCANIA	L113CRL	1825917	S2555	TAMWORTH
3698	SCANIA	L113CRL	1826073	S2558	MELBOURNE
3699	SCANIA	L113CRL	1826074	S2556	TAMWORTH
3700	SCANIA	L113CRL	1826075	S2561	TAMWORTH
3701	SCANIA	L113CRL	1826076	S2562	TAMWORTH
3702	SCANIA	L113CRL	1826077	S2563	TAMWORTH
3703	SCANIA	L113CRL	1826078	S2559	MELBOURNE
3704	SCANIA	L113CRL	1826298	S2564	TAMWORTH
3705	SCANIA	L113CRL	1826299	S2560	MELBOURNE
3706	SCANIA	L113CRL	1826300	S2565	TAMWORTH
3707	SCANIA	L113CRL	1826301	S2573	MELBOURNE
3708	SCANIA	L113CRL	1826302	S2566	TAMWORTH
3709	SCANIA	L113CRL	1826303	S2567	TAMWORTH
3710	SCANIA	L113CRL	1826828	S2568	TAMWORTH
3711	SCANIA	L113CRL	1826829	S2569	TAMWORTH
3712	SCANIA	L113CRL	1824888	S2748	MELBOURNE
3713	SCANIA	L113CRL	1825924	S2571	TAMWORTH
3714	SCANIA	L113CRL	1825925	S2572	TAMWORTH
3715	SCANIA	L113CRL	1825926	S2585	TAMWORTH
3716	SCANIA	L113CRL	1826081	S2570	TAMWORTH
3717	SCANIA	L113CRL	1826830	S2586	TAMWORTH
3718	SCANIA	L113CRL	1826831	S2587	TAMWORTH
3719	SCANIA	L113CRL	1826832	S2588	TAMWORTH
3720	SCANIA	L113CRL	1826833	S2589	TAMWORTH
3721	SCANIA	L113CRL	1826838	S2590	TAMWORTH
3722	SCANIA	L113CRL	1826839	S2591	TAMWORTH
3723	SCANIA	L113CRL	1826840	S2592	TAMWORTH
3724	SCANIA	L113CRL	1826841	S2593	TAMWORTH
3725	SCANIA	L113CRL	1826842	S2594	TAMWORTH
3726	SCANIA	L113CRL	1826843	S2595	TAMWORTH
3727	SCANIA	L113CRL	1827097	S2596	TAMWORTH
3728	SCANIA	L113CRL	1827098	S2597	TAMWORTH
3729	SCANIA	L113CRL	1827099	S2598	TAMWORTH
3730	SCANIA	L113CRL	1827100	S2574	MELBOURNE
3731	SCANIA	L113CRL	1827101	S2575	MELBOURNE
3732	SCANIA	L113CRL	1827102	S2599	TAMWORTH
3733	SCANIA	L113CRL	1827306	S2600	TAMWORTH
3734	SCANIA	L113CRL	1827307	S2601	TAMWORTH
3735	SCANIA	L113CRL	1827308	S2602	TAMWORTH
3736	SCANIA	L113CRL	1827309	S2603	TAMWORTH
3737	SCANIA	L113CRL	1827310	S2604	TAMWORTH
3738	SCANIA	L113CRL	1827311	S2605	TAMWORTH
3739	SCANIA	L113CRL	1827551	S2606	TAMWORTH
3740	SCANIA	L113CRL	1827552	S2607	TAMWORTH
3741	SCANIA	L113CRL	1827553	S2608	TAMWORTH
3742	SCANIA	L113CRL	1827554	S2609	TAMWORTH
3743	SCANIA	L113CRL	1827555	S2610	TAMWORTH
3744	SCANIA	L113CRL	1827770	S2611	TAMWORTH
3745	SCANIA	L113CRL	1827771	S2612	TAMWORTH
3746	SCANIA	L113CRL	1827772	S2613	TAMWORTH
3747	SCANIA	L113CRL	1827773	S2614	TAMWORTH
3748	SCANIA	L113CRL	1827774	S2615	TAMWORTH
3749	SCANIA	L113CRL	1827775	S2616	TAMWORTH
3750	SCANIA	L113CRL	1827994	S2617	TAMWORTH
3751	SCANIA	L113CRL	1827995	S2618	TAMWORTH
3752	SCANIA	L113CRL	1827996	S2619	TAMWORTH
3753	SCANIA	L113CRL	1827997	S2620	TAMWORTH
3754	SCANIA	L113CRL	1827998	S2621	TAMWORTH
3755	SCANIA	L113CRL	1827999	S2622	TAMWORTH
3756	SCANIA	L113CRL	1828099	S2623	TAMWORTH
3757	SCANIA	L113CRL	1828100	S2624	TAMWORTH
3758	SCANIA	L113CRL	1828101	S2625	TAMWORTH
3759	SCANIA	L113CRL	1828102	S2626	TAMWORTH
3760	SCANIA	L113CRL	1828103	S2576	MEL-TAMWORTH
3761	SCANIA	L113CRL	1828104	S2577	MEL-TAMWORTH
3762	SCANIA	L113CRL	1828222	S2627	TAMWORTH
3763	SCANIA	L113CRL	1828223	S2628	TAMWORTH
3764	SCANIA	L113CRL	1828224	S2629	TAMWORTH
3765	SCANIA	L113CRL	1828225	S2630	TAMWORTH
3766	SCANIA	L113CRL	1828226	S2631	TAMWORTH
3767	SCANIA	L113CRL	1828227	S2632	TAMWORTH
3768	SCANIA	L113CRL	1828483	S2633	TAMWORTH
3769	SCANIA	L113CRL	1828484	S2578	MEL-TAMWORTH
3770	SCANIA	L113CRL	1828485	S2634	TAMWORTH
3771	SCANIA	L113CRL	1828486	S2579	MEL-TAMWORTH
3772	SCANIA	L113CRL	1828487	S2635	TAMWORTH
3773	SCANIA	L113CRL	1828488	S2580	MEL-TAMWORTH
3774	SCANIA	L113CRL	1828889	S2636	TAMWORTH
3775	SCANIA	L113CRL	1828890	S2648	TAMWORTH
3776	SCANIA	L113CRL	1828891	S2637	TAMWORTH
3777	SCANIA	L113CRL	1828892	S2646	TAMWORTH
3778	SCANIA	L113CRL	1828893	S2638	TAMWORTH
3779	SCANIA	L113CRL	1828894	S2643	TAMWORTH
3780	SCANIA	L113CRL	1828951	S2639	TAMWORTH
3781	SCANIA	L113CRL	1828952	S2640	TAMWORTH
3782	SCANIA	L113CRL	1828956	S2641	TAMWORTH
3783	SCANIA	L113CRL	1828953	S2642	TAMWORTH
3784	SCANIA	L113CRL	1828954	S2644	TAMWORTH
3785	SCANIA	L113CRL	1828955	S2645	TAMWORTH
3786	SCANIA	L113CRL	1829159	S2647	TAMWORTH
3787	SCANIA	L113CRL	1829160	S2649	TAMWORTH
3788	SCANIA	L113CRL	1829161	S2650	TAMWORTH
3789	SCANIA	L113CRL	1829162	S2651	TAMWORTH
3790	SCANIA	L113CRL	1829163	S2652	TAMWORTH
3791	SCANIA	L113CRL	1829164	S2653	TAMWORTH
3792	SCANIA	L113CRL	1829165	S2654	TAMWORTH
3793	SCANIA	L113CRL	1829166	S2655	TAMWORTH
3794	SCANIA	L113CRL	1829167	S2656	TAMWORTH
3795	SCANIA	L113CRL	1829168	u672657	TAMWORTH
3796	SCANIA	L113CRL	1829169	u672658	TAMWORTH
3797	SCANIA	L113CRL	1829170	u672659	TAMWORTH
3798	SCANIA	L113CRL	1829555	u672660	TAMWORTH
3799	SCANIA	L113CRL	1829556	u672661	TAMWORTH
3800	SCANIA	L113CRL	1829557	u672662	TAMWORTH
3801	SCANIA	L113CRL	1829558	u672663	TAMWORTH
3802	SCANIA	L113CRL	1829559	u672664	TAMWORTH
3803	SCANIA	L113CRL	1829560	u672665	TAMWORTH
3804	SCANIA	L113CRL	1829696	u672666	TAMWORTH
3805	SCANIA	L113CRL	1829697	u672667	TAMWORTH
3806	SCANIA	L113CRL	1829698	u672668	TAMWORTH
3807	SCANIA	L113CRL	1829699	u672669	TAMWORTH
3808	SCANIA	L113CRL	1829700	u672670	TAMWORTH
3809	SCANIA	L113CRL	1829701	u672671	TAMWORTH
3810	SCANIA	L113CRL	1830076	u672672	TAMWORTH
3811	SCANIA	L113CRL	1830077	u672673	TAMWORTH
3812	SCANIA	L113CRL	1830078	u672674	TAMWORTH
3813	SCANIA	L113CRL	1830079	u672675	TAMWORTH
3814	SCANIA	L113CRL	1830080	u672676	TAMWORTH
3815	SCANIA	L113CRL	1830081	u672677	TAMWORTH
3816	SCANIA	L113CRL	1830082	u672678	TAMWORTH
3817	SCANIA	L113CRL	1830083	u672679	TAMWORTH
3818	SCANIA	L113CRL	1830084	u672680	TAMWORTH
3819	SCANIA	L113CRL	1830085	u672681	TAMWORTH
3820	SCANIA	L113CRL	1830086	u672682	TAMWORTH
3821	SCANIA	L113CRL	1830339	u672683	TAMWORTH
3822	SCANIA	L113CRL	1830340	u672684	TAMWORTH
3823	SCANIA	L113CRL	1830341	u672685	TAMWORTH
3824	SCANIA	L113CRL	1830342	u672686	TAMWORTH
3825	SCANIA	L113CRL	1830343	u672687	TAMWORTH
3826	SCANIA	L113CRL	1830344	u672688	TAMWORTH
3827	SCANIA	L113CRL	1830603	u672689	TAMWORTH
3828	SCANIA	L113CRL	1830604	u672690	TAMWORTH
3829	SCANIA	L113CRL	1830605	u682691	TAMWORTH
3830	SCANIA	L113CRL	1830606	u682692	TAMWORTH
3831	SCANIA	L113CRL	1830607	u682693	TAMWORTH
3832	SCANIA	L113CRL	1830608	u682694	TAMWORTH
3833	SCANIA	L113CRL	1830755	u682695	TAMWORTH
3834	SCANIA	L113CRL	1830756	u682696	TAMWORTH
3835	SCANIA	L113CRL	1830757	u682697	TAMWORTH
3836	SCANIA	L113CRL	1830758	u682698	TAMWORTH
3837	SCANIA	L113CRL	1830759	u682699	TAMWORTH
3838	SCANIA	L113CRL	1830760	u682700	TAMWORTH
3839	SCANIA	L113CRL	1831010	u682581	TAMWORTH
3840	SCANIA	L113CRL	1831011	u682582	TAMWORTH
3841	SCANIA	L113CRL	1831012	u682583	TAMWORTH
3842	SCANIA	L113CRL	1831013	u682584	TAMWORTH
3843	SCANIA	L113CRL	1831014	u682991	TAMWORTH
3844	SCANIA	L113CRL	1831015	u682992	TAMWORTH
3845	SCANIA	L113CRL	1831394	u682993	TAMWORTH
3846	SCANIA	L113CRL	1831395	u682994	TAMWORTH
3847	VOLVO	B10BLE	2965	B038470	MEL-BRISBANE
3848	VOLVO	B10BLE	2995	B038480	BRISBANE
3849	VOLVO	B10BLE	2996	B038490	BRISBANE
3850	VOLVO	B10BLE	2997	B038500	BRISBANE
3851	VOLVO	B10BLE	2998	B038510	BRISBANE
3852	VOLVO	B10BLE	3093	B038520	BRISBANE
3853	VOLVO	B10BLE	3094	B038530	BRISBANE
3854	VOLVO	B10BLE	3095	B038540	BRISBANE
3855	VOLVO	B10BLE	3096	B038550	BRISBANE
3856	VOLVO	B10BLE	3097	B038560	BRISBANE
3857	VOLVO	B10BLE	3111	B038570	BRISBANE
3858	VOLVO	B10BLE	3112	B038580	BRISBANE
3859	VOLVO	B10BLE	3114	B038590	BRISBANE
3860	VOLVO	B10BLE	3115	B038600	BRISBANE
3861	VOLVO	B10BLE	3198	B038610	BRISBANE
3862	VOLVO	B10BLE	3113	B038620	BRISBANE
3863	VOLVO	B10BLE	3199	B038630	BRISBANE
3864	VOLVO	B10BLE	3200	B038640	BRISBANE
3865	VOLVO	B10BLE	3201	B038650	BRISBANE
3866	VOLVO	B10BLE	3202	B038660	BRISBANE
3867	VOLVO	B10BLE	3241	B038670	BRISBANE
3868	VOLVO	B10BLE	3242	7670450	BRISBANE
3869	VOLVO	B10BLE	3243	7670460	BRISBANE
3870	VOLVO	B10BLE	3244	7670520	BRISBANE
3871	VOLVO	B10BLE	3245	7670510	BRISBANE
3872	VOLVO	B10BLE	3246	7670630	BRISBANE
3873	VOLVO	B10BLE	3247	7670640	BRISBANE
3874	VOLVO	B10BLE	3248	7570860	BRISBANE
3875	VOLVO	B10BLE	3430	7570910	BRISBANE
3876	VOLVO	B10BLE	3431	7437095	BRISBANE
3877	VOLVO	B10BLE	3432	7437101	BRISBANE
3878	VOLVO	B10BLE	3433	7437103	BRISBANE
3879	VOLVO	B10BLE	3434	7437111	BRISBANE
3880	VOLVO	B10BLE	3435	7437115	BRISBANE
3881	VOLVO	B10BLE	3436	7437121	BRISBANE
3882	VOLVO	B10BLE	3437	7437125	BRISBANE
3883	VOLVO	B10BLE	3438	7437127	BRISBANE
3884	VOLVO	B10BLE	3439	74371350	BRISBANE
3885	VOLVO	B10BLE	3740	74371420	BRISBANE
3886	VOLVO	B10BLE	3741	74371450	BRISBANE
3887	VOLVO	B10BLE	3742	74371470	BRISBANE
3888	VOLVO	B10BLE	3743	74371830	BRISBANE
3889	VOLVO	B10BLE	3744	74371930	BRISBANE
3890	VOLVO	B10BLE	3791	75145	BRIS-TAM
3891	VOLVO	B10BLE	3792	75146	BRIS-TAM
3892	VOLVO	B10BLE	3793	75147	BRIS-TAM
3893	VOLVO	B10BLE	3794	75148	BRIS-TAM
3894	VOLVO	B10BLE	3795	75144	BRIS-TAM
3895	VOLVO	B10BLE	3877	B038950	BRISBANE
3896	VOLVO	B10BLE	3878	B038960	BRISBANE
3897	VOLVO	B10BLE	3879	75152	BRIS-TAM
3898	VOLVO	B10BLE	3880	75153	BRIS-TAM
3899	VOLVO	B10BLE	3881	75154	BRIS-TAM
3900	VOLVO	B10BLE	3992	684000	TAMWORTH
3901	VOLVO	B10BLE	3993	684001	TAMWORTH
3902	VOLVO	B10BLE	3994	684002	TAMWORTH
3903	VOLVO	B10BLE	3991	684003	TAMWORTH
3904	VOLVO	B10BLE	3995	684004	TAMWORTH
3905	VOLVO	B10BLE	4060	684005	TAMWORTH
3906	VOLVO	B10BLE	4061	684006	TAMWORTH
3907	VOLVO	B10BLE	4062	684007	TAMWORTH
3908	VOLVO	B10BLE	4063	684008	TAMWORTH
3909	VOLVO	B10BLE	4064	684009	TAMWORTH
3910	VOLVO	B10BLE	3912	684010	TAMWORTH
3911	VOLVO	B10BLE	3913	684011	TAMWORTH
3912	VOLVO	B10BLE	3914	684012	TAMWORTH
3913	VOLVO	B10BLE	3915	684013	TAMWORTH
3914	VOLVO	B10BLE	3916	684014	TAMWORTH
3915	VOLVO	B10BLE	3938	684015	TAMWORTH
3916	VOLVO	B10BLE	3939	684016	TAMWORTH
3917	VOLVO	B10BLE	3940	684017	TAMWORTH
3918	VOLVO	B10BLE	3941	684018	TAMWORTH
3919	VOLVO	B10BLE	3942	684019	TAMWORTH
3920	VOLVO	B10BLE	4198	684020	TAMWORTH
3921	VOLVO	B10BLE	4199	684021	TAMWORTH
3922	VOLVO	B10BLE	4200	684022	TAMWORTH
3923	VOLVO	B10BLE	4201	684023	TAMWORTH
3924	VOLVO	B10BLE	4202	684024	TAMWORTH
3925	VOLVO	B10BLE	4398	684025	TAMWORTH
3926	VOLVO	B10BLE	4399	684026	TAMWORTH
3927	VOLVO	B10BLE	4400	684027	TAMWORTH
3928	VOLVO	B10BLE	4401	684028	TAMWORTH
3929	VOLVO	B10BLE	4402	684029	TAMWORTH
3930	VOLVO	B10BLE	4340	684030	TAMWORTH
3931	VOLVO	B10BLE	4341	684031	TAMWORTH
3932	VOLVO	B10BLE	4342	684032	TAMWORTH
3933	VOLVO	B10BLE	4343	684033	TAMWORTH
3934	VOLVO	B10BLE	4344	684034	TAMWORTH
3935	VOLVO	B10BLE	4488	684035	TAMWORTH
3936	VOLVO	B10BLE	4489	684036	TAMWORTH
3937	VOLVO	B10BLE	4490	684037	TAMWORTH
3938	VOLVO	B10BLE	4491	684038	TAMWORTH
3939	VOLVO	B10BLE	4492	684039	TAMWORTH
3940	VOLVO	B10BLE		684040	TAMWORTH
3941	VOLVO	B10BLE		684041	TAMWORTH
3942	VOLVO	B10BLE		684042	TAMWORTH
3943	VOLVO	B10BLE		684043	TAMWORTH
3944	VOLVO	B10BLE		684044	TAMWORTH
3945	VOLVO	B10BLE		684045	TAMWORTH
3946	VOLVO	B10BLE		684046	TAMWORTH
3947	VOLVO	B10BLE		684047	TAMWORTH
3948	VOLVO	B10BLE		684048	TAMWORTH
3949	VOLVO	B10BLE		684049	TAMWORTH
3950	VOLVO	B10BLE		684050	TAMWORTH
3951	VOLVO	B10BLE		684051	TAMWORTH
3952	VOLVO	B10BLE		684052	TAMWORTH
3953	VOLVO	B10BLE		684053	TAMWORTH
3954	VOLVO	B10BLE		684054	TAMWORTH
3955	VOLVO	B10BLE		684055	TAMWORTH
3956	VOLVO	B10BLE		684056	TAMWORTH
3957	VOLVO	B10BLE		694057	TAMWORTH
3958	VOLVO	B10BLE		694058	TAMWORTH
3959	VOLVO	B10BLE		694059	TAMWORTH
3960	VOLVO	B10BLE		694060	TAMWORTH
3961	VOLVO	B10BLE		694061	TAMWORTH
3962	VOLVO	B10BLE		694062	TAMWORTH
3963	VOLVO	B10BLE		694063	TAMWORTH
3964	VOLVO	B10BLE		694064	TAMWORTH
3965	VOLVO	B10BLE		694065	TAMWORTH
3966	VOLVO	B10BLE		694066	TAMWORTH
3967	VOLVO	B10BLE		694067	TAMWORTH
3968	VOLVO	B10BLE		694068	TAMWORTH
3969	VOLVO	B10BLE		694069	TAMWORTH
3970	VOLVO	B10BLE		694070	TAMWORTH
3971	VOLVO	B10BLE		694071	TAMWORTH

List sourced from Ansair Tamworth Factory 2002.

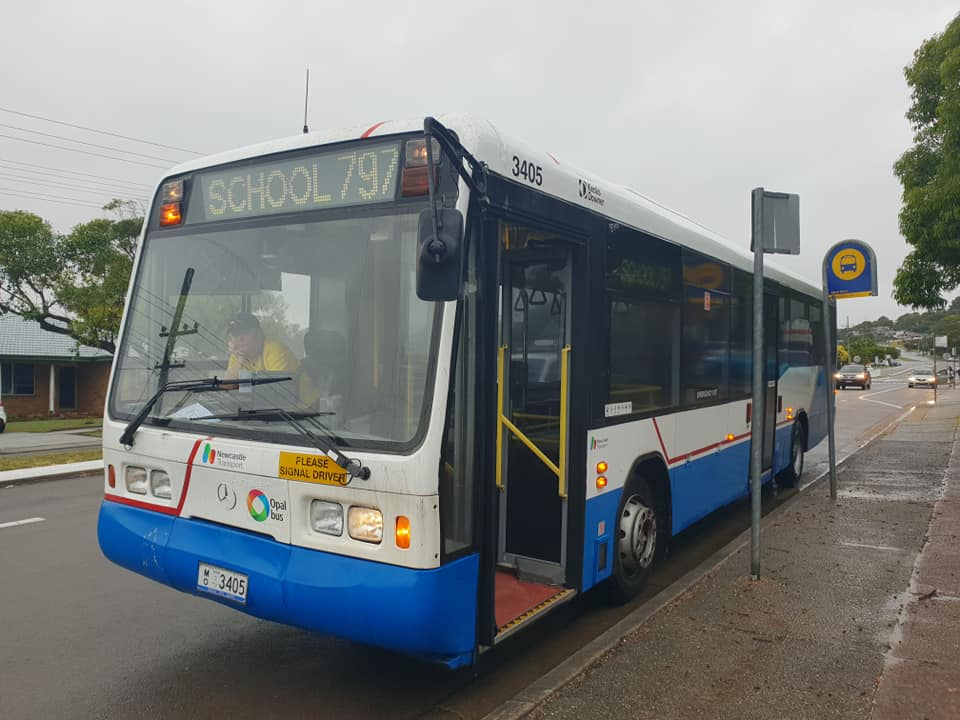
Constructed at Ansair Tullamarine, one of the odd-bod chassis combinations requested in State Transit Authority's orders, #3405 Mercedes Benz O405N Ansair Orana seen idling at Swansea High School after completing a school special. February 2019
