= Denning Manufacturing =

Australian bus manufacturer

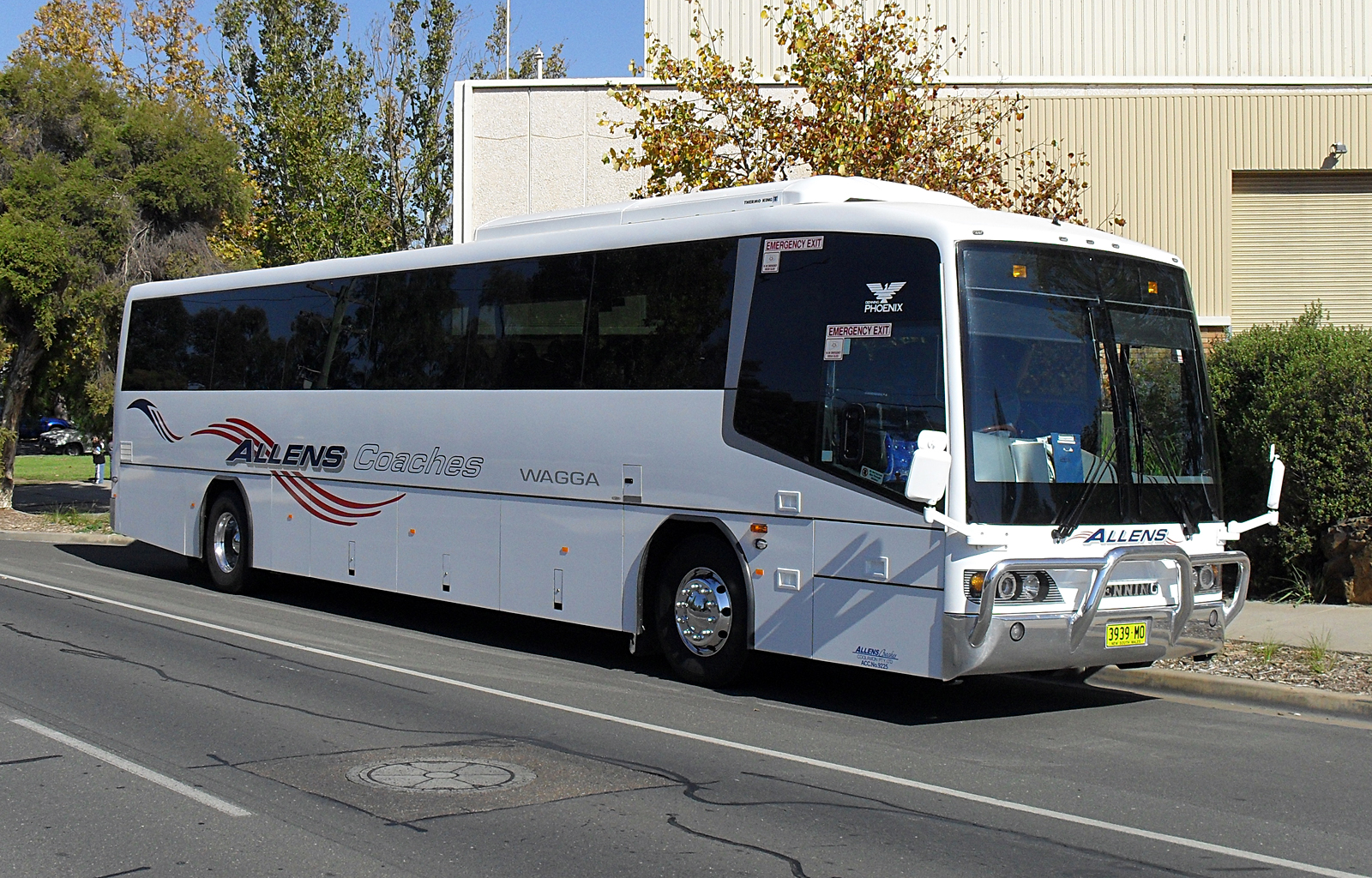
- Denning Manufacturing Silver Phoenix in Wagga Wagga, New South Wales in May 2009
- Industry: Bus manufacturing
- Founded: 1994 (as Alan B Denning); 2004 (as Denning Manufacturing)
- Defunct: 2024
- Fate: Merged into Custom Denning and manufacturing operations ceased
- Headquarters: Acacia Ridge, Queensland
- Parent: Custom Bus
- Website: www.custombus.com.au

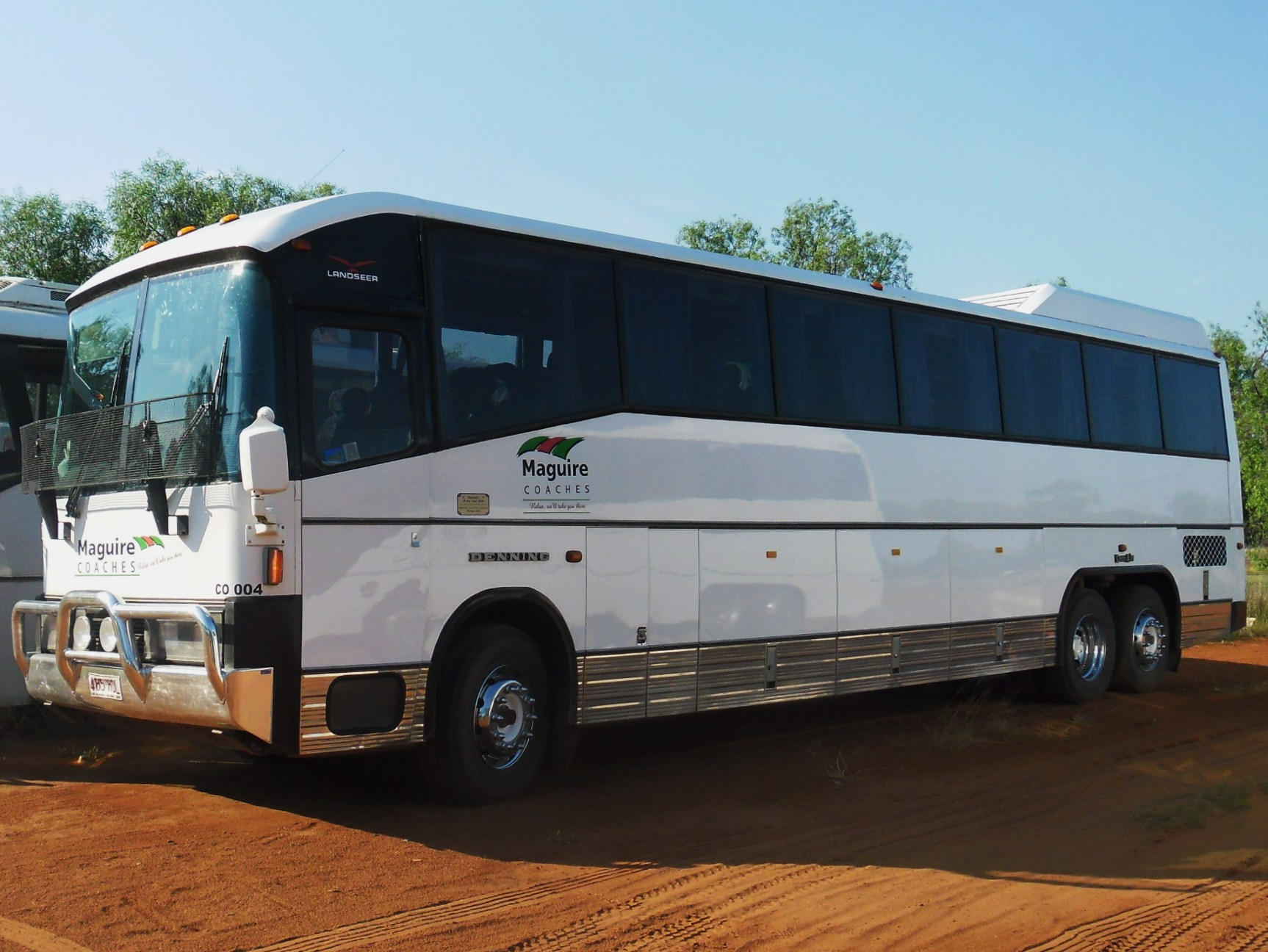
Maguire Coaches Landseer in December 2012

Denning Manufacturing was an Australian bus manufacturer in Acacia Ridge, Brisbane, Australia. In September 2019, it was acquired by Custom Bus, but its branding and operations were retained. As of December 2024, manufacturing operations have ceased.

Denning Manufacturing was rebranded from Alan B Denning after the latter went into administration in 2004, and was subsequently bought by Aussie Drifter Luxury Motor Homes Alan B Denning had been formed ten years earlier in 1994. It manufactured integral buses and coaches (chassis and body) as well as chassis for bodying by other manufacturers with Caterpillar or Cummins engines.

== History ==
Denning
- Founded: 1958
- Founder: Alan B Denning
- Defunct: 1990
- Fate: merged with Austral to form
- Successor: Austral Denning
- Headquarters: Acacia Ridge
- Parent: Leyland Australia

=== Denning ===
Denning commenced bodying buses in Brisbane in 1958. Denning's first integral bus (both chassis and body), the Monocoach, was launched in 1966. Along with the later Denair and Landseer, it would become the dominant long-distance coach in Australia.

In 1968, Denning was sold to Leyland Australia. Between 1968 and 1970 it bodied 136 Leyland Panthers for the Brisbane City Council.

In 1970, a plant was opened in Beverley, South Australia to body 292 AEC Swift 691s for the Municipal Tramways Trust in Adelaide. Some monocoaches were built there before the plant closed in August 1974. In 1979, Denning coaches began to be assembled under licence in New Zealand by the Mount Cook Group.

In December 1988, Leyland Australia (by now renamed JRA Limited) purchased Denning's biggest competitor in the coach market, Austral from AP Group. Both continued to operate separately until 1990 when the Denning plant in Acacia Ridge was closed and production transferred to the Austral facility in Geebung.

=== Alan B Denning Co. ===
The Alan B Denning Co. commenced operations supplying body kits for buses assembled in Asia, primarily on Mercedes-Benz chassis in 1994. In February 1995 it began bodying buses and coaches for Australian operators. The company was placed in administration in November 2003 with the plant subsequently being purchased by Aussie Drifter Luxury Motor Homes who rebranded the business as Denning Manufacturing.

The business was successfully operated up until its sale to the Dunn Group in 2019.

== See also ==
- Transport in Brisbane
