= Clifford Corporation =

- Company type: Public
- Traded as: ASX: CCN
- Defunct: November 1998
- Fate: Administration, receivership and liquidation; Some divisions bought out; Directors jailed and bankrupted
- Headquarters: Australia
- Products: Bus manufacturer
- Subsidiaries: Ansair; Austral Denning; PMC Australia; Saydair seats

Clifford Corporation was a listed Australian company that purchased several bus manufacturing businesses in the mid-1990s before collapsing in November 1998.

== History ==
In August 1995 Clifford Corporation purchased the Ansair bus bodybuilding business from Ansett Transport Industries. That was followed by the Austral Pacific Group, which comprised the Austral Denning and PMC Australia businesses.

The business collapsed in November 1998 with several of the company's office holders prosecuted.
