= List of highways numbered 94 =

The following highways are numbered 94:

== International ==
- E94 European route E94

== Australia ==
- National Route 94 in Western Australia
- Burley Griffin Way (New South Wales)
- Dohertys Road (Victoria) (New Route)

== Canada ==
- Newfoundland and Labrador Route 94
- Ontario Highway 94

== China ==
- G94 Expressway

== Germany ==
- Bundesautobahn 94

== Greece ==
- EO94 road

== Iran ==
- Road 94

== Korea, South ==
- National Route 94

== New Zealand ==
- New Zealand State Highway 94

== Poland ==
- DK 94 (National road 94)

== United States ==
- Interstate 94
- U.S. Route 94 (former)
- Alabama State Route 94
- Arkansas Highway 94
- California State Route 94
- Colorado State Highway 94
- Connecticut Route 94
- Florida State Road 94
- Georgia State Route 94
- Illinois Route 94
  - Illinois Route 94A (former)
  - Illinois Route 94B (former)
- Iowa Highway 94
- K-94 (Kansas highway)
- Kentucky Route 94
- Louisiana Highway 94
  - Louisiana State Route 94 (former)
- Maine State Route 94
- Maryland Route 94
- M-94 (Michigan Highway)
- Minnesota State Highway 94 (1934–1935) (former)
  - Minnesota State Highway 94 (1935–1958) (former)
- Missouri Route 94
- Nebraska Highway 94
- New Jersey Route 94
  - County Route 94 (Bergen County, New Jersey)
    - County Route S94 (Bergen County, New Jersey)
- New Mexico State Road 94
- New York State Route 94
  - County Route 94 (Cattaraugus County, New York)
  - County Route 94 (Dutchess County, New York)
  - County Route 94 (Madison County, New York)
  - County Route 94 (Oneida County, New York)
  - County Route 94 (Onondaga County, New York)
  - County Route 94 (Rensselaer County, New York)
  - County Route 94 (Rockland County, New York)
  - County Route 94 (Saratoga County, New York)
  - County Route 94 (Steuben County, New York)
  - County Route 94 (Suffolk County, New York)
    - County Route 94A (Suffolk County, New York)
  - County Route 94 (Sullivan County, New York)
  - County Route 94 (Westchester County, New York)
- North Carolina Highway 94
- Ohio State Route 94
- Oklahoma State Highway 94
- Pennsylvania Route 94
- Rhode Island Route 94
- South Carolina Highway 94 (pre-1937) (former)
- Tennessee State Route 94
- Texas State Highway 94
  - Farm to Market Road 94
  - Texas State Highway Spur 94 (former)
- Utah State Route 94
- Virginia State Route 94
- West Virginia Route 94
- Wisconsin Highway 94 (former)
- Wyoming Highway 94

== See also ==
- A94
- D 94 road (United Arab Emirates)
- N94
- List of national roads in Latvia § P94

Preceded by 93	Lists of highways 94	Succeeded by 95
