= List of highways numbered 93 =

Route 93 or Highway 93 can refer to:

== International ==
- E93 European route E93

== Australia ==
– Victoria

== Canada ==
- Alberta Highway 93
- British Columbia Highway 93
- Newfoundland and Labrador Route 93
- Ontario Highway 93

== China ==
- G93 Chengyu Ring Expressway

== Germany ==
- A 93 (Bundesautobahn 93)
- B 93 (Bundesstraße 93)

== India ==
- National Highway 93

== Iran ==
- Road 93

== Korea, South ==
- National Route 93

== Mexico ==
- Mexican Federal Highway 93

== New Zealand ==
- New Zealand State Highway 93

== Poland ==
- DK 93 (National road 93)

== United States ==
- Interstate 93
- U.S. Route 93
  - U.S. Route 93A
- Alabama State Route 93
  - County Route 93 (Lee County, Alabama)
- Arizona State Route 93 (former)
- Arkansas Highway 93
- California State Route 93 (unsigned)
- Colorado State Highway 93
- Connecticut Route 93 (former)
- Florida State Road 93
  - Florida State Road 93A
- Georgia State Route 93
- Hawaii Route 93
- Illinois Route 93
- Iowa Highway 93
- Kentucky Route 93
- Louisiana Highway 93
  - Louisiana State Route 93 (former)
- Maine State Route 93
- Maryland Route 93 (former)
- Massachusetts Route 93 (former)
- M-93 (Michigan highway)
- Minnesota State Highway 93
- Nebraska Highway 93 (1934–1947) (former)
  - Nebraska Highway 93 (1947–1957) (former)
  - Nebraska Link 93B
  - Nebraska Link 93E
  - Nebraska Spur 93A
  - Nebraska Spur 93C
  - Nebraska Spur 93D
  - Nebraska Spur 93F
- Nevada State Route 93 (1960s) (former)
- New Jersey Route 93
  - County Route 93 (Bergen County, New Jersey)
- New Mexico State Road 93
- New York State Route 93
  - County Route 93 (Chautauqua County, New York)
  - County Route 93 (Dutchess County, New York)
  - County Route 93 (Erie County, New York)
  - County Route 93 (Madison County, New York)
  - County Route 93 (Niagara County, New York)
  - County Route 93 (Orange County, New York)
  - County Route 93 (Rockland County, New York)
  - County Route 93 (Steuben County, New York)
  - County Route 93 (Suffolk County, New York)
- North Carolina Highway 93
- Ohio State Route 93
- Oklahoma State Highway 93
- Pennsylvania Route 93
- South Carolina Highway 93
- Tennessee State Route 93
- Texas State Highway 93
  - Texas State Highway Loop 93 (former)
  - Texas State Highway Spur 93
  - Farm to Market Road 93
  - Ranch to Market Road 93 (former)
- Utah State Route 93
- Virginia State Route 93
- West Virginia Route 93
- Wisconsin Highway 93
- Wyoming Highway 93

== See also ==
- A93

Preceded by 92	Lists of highways 93	Succeeded by 94
