= SR 91 (disambiguation) =

SR 91 may refer to:

- Aurora (aircraft)
- State Road 91 or State Route 91, in the list of highways numbered 91
- SR-91, used to make sunglasses
