= Route 91 (disambiguation) =

Route 91 may refer to:

- Route 91 (MTA Maryland), a bus route in Baltimore, Maryland
- London Buses route 91
- Route 91 Harvest, a country music festival

== See also ==
- List of highways numbered 91
