= List of highways numbered 92 =

The following highways are numbered 92:

== International ==
- E92 European route E92

== Canada ==
- Newfoundland and Labrador Route 92
- Ontario King's Highway 92 (Former)
  - County Road 92 (Simcoe County, Ontario)

== China ==
- G92 Expressway

== Greece ==
- EO92 road

== Iceland ==
- Route 92

== Iran ==
- Road 92

== Israel ==
- Highway 92 (Israel)

== Korea, South ==
- National Route 92

== Poland ==
- National road 92

== United Kingdom ==
- A92 road

== United States ==
- Interstate 92 (proposed)
  - Interstate 92 (Michigan) (former proposal)
- U.S. Route 92
- Alabama State Route 92
  - County Route 92 (Cherokee County, Alabama)
  - County Route 92 (Cleburne County, Alabama)
  - County Route 92 (DeKalb County, Alabama)
  - County Route 92 (Hale County, Alabama)
  - County Route 92 (Greene County, Alabama)
  - County Route 92 (Jackson County, Alabama)
  - County Route 92 (Lauderdale County, Alabama)
  - County Route 92 (Lawrence County, Alabama)
  - County Route 92 (Lee County, Alabama)
  - County Route 92 (Marengo County, Alabama)
  - County Route 92 (Mobile County, Alabama)
  - County Route 92 (Pickens County, Alabama)
  - County Route 92 (Randolph County, Alabama)
  - County Route 92 (Winston County, Alabama)
- Arizona State Route 92
- Arkansas Highway 92
  - County Route 92 (Faulkner County, Arkansas)
  - County Route 92 (Independence County, Arkansas)
  - County Route 92 (Jackson County, Arkansas)
  - County Road 92 (Lonoke County, Arkansas)
  - County Route 92 (White County, Arkansas)
- California State Route 92
- Colorado State Highway 92
  - County Route 92 (Delta County, Colorado)
- Delaware Route 92
- Florida State Road 92
  - County Road 92 (Collier County, Florida)
  - County Route 92 (Volusia County, Florida)
- Georgia State Route 92
  - County Route 92 (Berrien County, Georgia)
  - County Route 92 (Evans County, Georgia)
  - County Route 92 (Laurens County, Georgia)
  - County Route 92 (Marion County, Georgia)
  - County Route 92 (Montgomery County, Georgia)
  - County Route 92 (Tattnall County, Georgia)
  - County Route 92 (Telfair County, Georgia)
  - County Route 92 (Tift County, Georgia)
  - County Route 92 (Treutlen County, Georgia)
  - County Route 92 (Schley County, Georgia)
  - County Route 92 (Webster County, Georgia)
- Hawaii Route 92
- Illinois Route 92
- County Route 92 (Adams County, Indiana)
  - County Route 92 (Allen County, Indiana)
  - County Route 92 (DeKalb County, Indiana)
  - County Route 92 (Elkhart County, Indiana)
  - County Route 92 (Huntington County, Indiana)
  - County Route 92 (Jay County, Indiana)
  - County Route 92 (Kosciusko County, Indiana)
  - County Route 92 (LaGrange County, Indiana)
  - County Route 92 (Lawrence County, Indiana)
  - County Route 92 (Noble County, Indiana)
  - County Route 92 (Steuben County, Indiana)
  - County Route 92 (Wells County, Indiana)
  - County Route 92 (Whitley County, Indiana)
- Iowa Highway 92
- K-92 (Kansas highway)
- Kentucky Route 92
- Louisiana Highway 92
  - Louisiana State Route 92 (former)
- Maine State Route 92
- Maryland Route 92 (former)
- M-92 (Michigan highway) (former)
- Minnesota State Highway 92
  - County Route 92 (Blue Earth County, Minnesota)
  - County Route 92 (Carver County, Minnesota)
  - County Route 92 (Faribault County, Minnesota)
  - County Route 92 (Hennepin County, Minnesota)
  - County Route 92 (Le Sueur County, Minnesota)
  - County Route 92 (Nicollet County, Minnesota)
  - County Route 92 (Waseca County, Minnesota)
- County Route 92 (Carroll County, Mississippi)
  - County Route 92 (Chickasaw County, Mississippi)
- Missouri Route 92
- Nebraska Highway 92
- Nebraska Recreation Road 92A
- Nevada State Route 92 (former)
- New Jersey Route 92 (former)
  - County Route 92 (Bergen County, New Jersey)
- New Mexico State Road 92
- New York State Route 92
  - County Route 92 (Dutchess County, New York)
  - County Route 92 (Herkimer County, New York)
  - County Route 92 (Jefferson County, New York)
  - County Route 92 (Monroe County, New York)
  - County Route 92 (Niagara County, New York)
  - County Route 92 (Oneida County, New York)
  - County Route 92 (Onondaga County, New York)
  - County Route 92 (Orange County, New York)
  - County Route 92 (Saratoga County, New York)
  - County Route 92 (Steuben County, New York)
  - County Route 92 (Suffolk County, New York)
- North Carolina Highway 92
- Ohio State Route 92 (former)
  - County Route 92 (Hardin County, Ohio)
  - County Route 92 (Perry County, Ohio)
  - County Route 92 (Sandusky County, Ohio)
- Oklahoma State Highway 92
- Pennsylvania Route 92
- South Carolina Highway 92
- Tennessee State Route 92
  - County Route 92 (McMinn County, Tennessee)
- Texas State Highway 92
  - Texas State Highway Spur 92
  - Farm to Market Road 92
  - County Route 92 (Austin County, Texas)
  - County Route 92 (Colorado County, Texas)
- Utah State Route 92
- Virginia State Route 92
- Washington State Route 92
- West Virginia Route 92
- Wisconsin Highway 92
- Wyoming Highway 92

== See also ==
- A92

Preceded by 91	Lists of highways 92	Succeeded by 93
