= Firefly Express =

Australian bus company

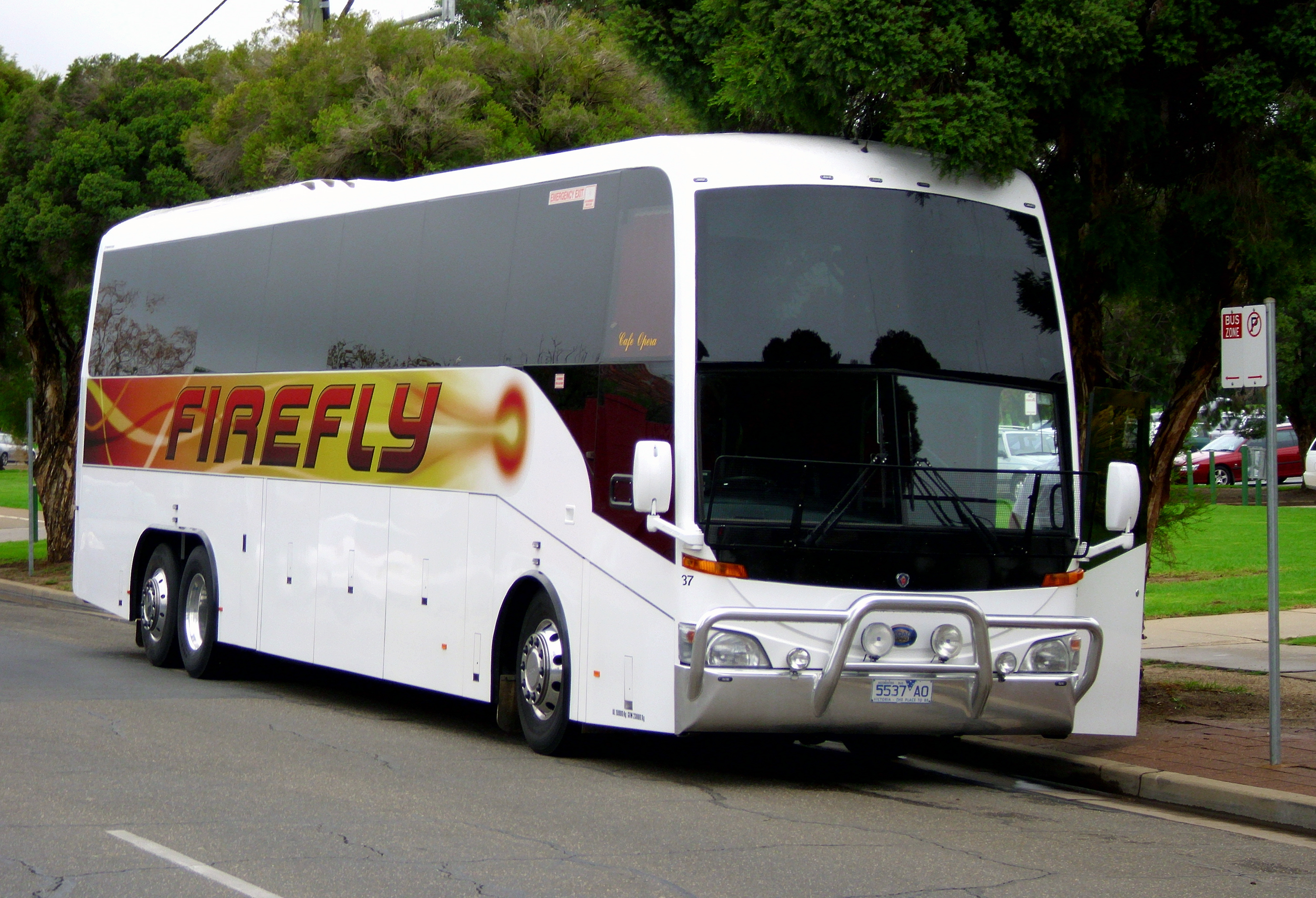
- Coach Concepts bodied Scania K124EB in Wagga Wagga in February 2010
- Parent: Frank Bono
- Commenced operation: 1965
- Headquarters: Maidstone
- Service type: Coach operator
- Routes: 2
- Destinations: Adelaide; Melbourne; Sydney
- Depots: 1
- Fleet: 34 (November 2026)
- Website: www.fireflyexpress.com.au

Firefly Express is an Australian interstate coach operator.

== History ==
Firefly Express' origins can be traced back to May 1965 when Frank Bono and George Sita purchased route 406 Footscray to East Keilor from Barnes Buslines. In 1968 Bono took full control. In August 1974 route 504 Moonee Ponds to Clifton Hill was purchased, being sold in December 1975.

In November 1986 Firefly commenced operating an overnight Melbourne to Sydney service. In July 1987 route 406 was sold to Westrans and the Melbourne charter licences of VIP Express purchased.

In December 1987 a daylight service was introduced between Melbourne and Sydney but did not become a permanent feature. In September 1988 an overnight Melbourne to Adelaide service commenced. In 2008, Firely entered a codeshare agreement with Greyhound Australia for the Adelaide service.

In 2008 Firefly commenced operating services between Ballarat, Ararat, Murtoa, Horsham and Nhill under contract to V/Line. In July 2021, Firefly took over 10 Bacchus Marsh Grammar school runs.

== Fleet ==
Firefly commenced interstate operations using Austral Tourmaster and later Austral HD1 coaches. In the 1990s it purchased double-deck Denning Landseer coaches, some second-hand. Since 1998 it has purchased Scanias with Coach Design and Coach Concepts bodywork. As at November 2026, the fleet consisted of 34 vehicles.
