= N94 =

N94 may refer to:

- N94 (Long Island bus)
- Carlisle Airport (Pennsylvania), in Cumberland County, Pennsylvania, United States
- Escadrille N.94, a unit of the French Air Force
- HMS Tuna (N94), a submarine of the Royal Navy
- Nebraska Highway 94, in the United States
- Scania N94, a city bus
