= Coach Concepts =

Australian coach bodybuilder

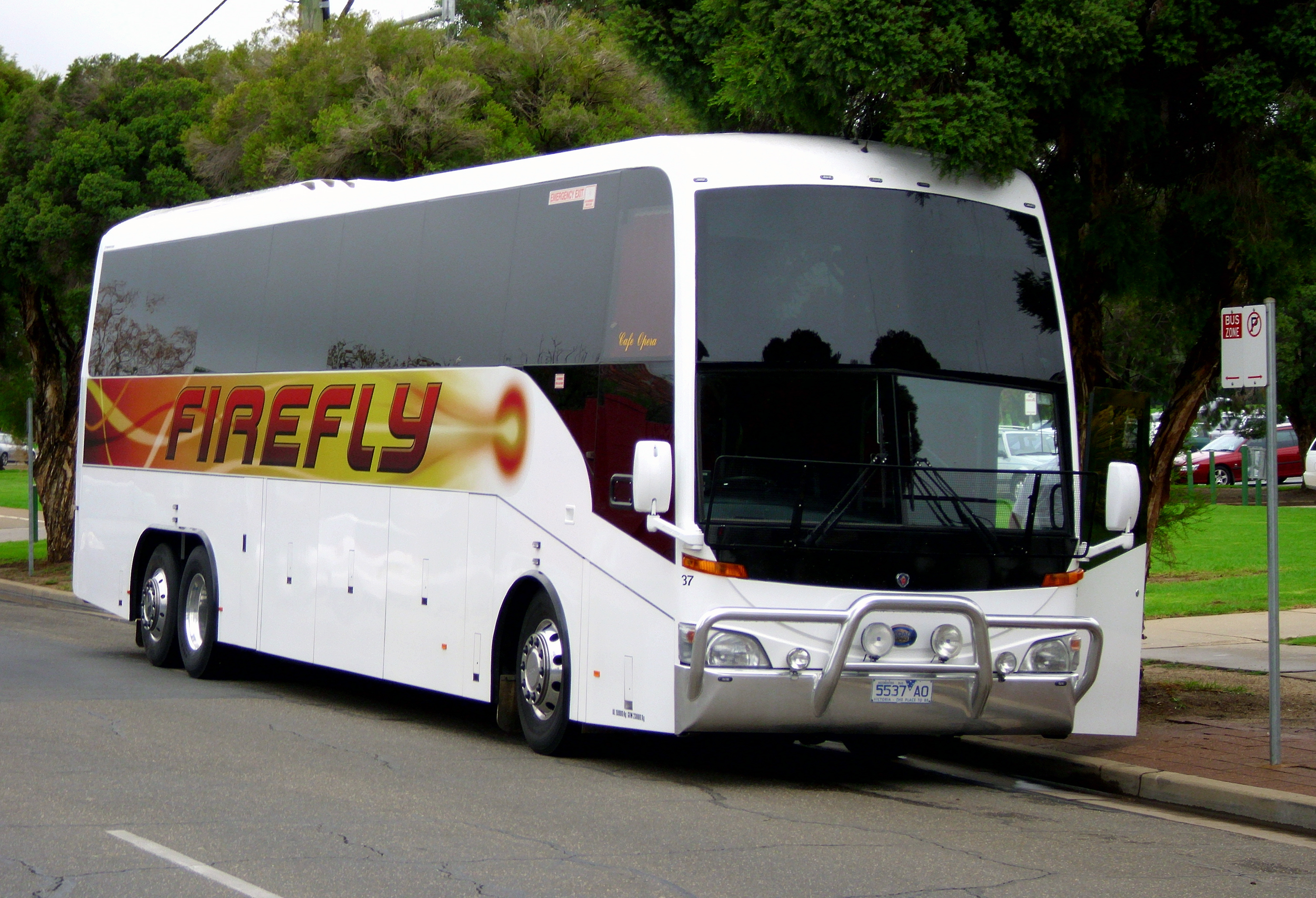
- Firefly Express Scania K124EB in February 2010
- Industry: Bus manufacturing
- Founded: 2004
- Headquarters: Rocklea
- Parent: Mark Gamer
- Website: coachconcepts.com.au

Coach Concepts is an Australian coach bodybuilder in Rocklea, Brisbane.

== History ==
Coach Concepts was formed by former Coach Design partner Mark Gamer in 2004 and had bodied 190 coaches as at April 2013. Large purchasers have been Bayside Coaches of Melbourne with 20 Volvos and AAT Kings with 12 Scanias.
