= A92 =

A92 or A-92 may refer to:

- A92 road, Scotland
- Autovía A-92, a Spanish motorway
- Dutch Defence, in the Encyclopaedia of Chess Openings
- A92 (group), an Irish hip hop collective
