= A93 =

A93 or A-93 may refer to:

- A93 road (Scotland)
- A93 motorway (Germany)
- Dutch Defence, in the Encyclopaedia of Chess Openings
