= A94 =

A94 or A-94 may refer to:

- A94 road (Great Britain), a major road in the UK
- A 94 motorway (Germany), a partially constructed regional highway in Bavaria
- Dutch Defence, in the Encyclopaedia of Chess Openings
