= List of highways numbered 91 =

The following highways are numbered 91:

== International ==
- E91 European route E91

== Australia ==
- Cairns Western Arterial Road
- Summerland Way

== Brasil ==
- SP-91, state highway in Sao Paulo

== Canada ==
- British Columbia Highway 91
  - British Columbia Highway 91A
- Newfoundland and Labrador Route 91

== China ==
- G91 Expressway

== Greece ==
- EO91 road

== Iran ==
- Road 91

== Israel ==
- Highway 91 (Israel)

== Italy ==
- Autostrada A91

== Greece ==
- Greek National Road 91

== Korea, South ==
- National Route 91

== United States ==
- Interstate 91
- U.S. Route 91
- Alabama State Route 91
  - County Route 91 (Lee County, Alabama)
- Arkansas Highway 91
- California State Route 91
- Colorado State Highway 91
- Florida State Road 91 (unsigned designation for Florida's Turnpike)
- Georgia State Route 91
  - Georgia State Route 91W (former)
- Illinois Route 91
- Iowa Highway 91
- Kentucky Route 91
- Louisiana Highway 91
  - Louisiana State Route 91 (former)
- Maine State Route 91
- Maryland Route 91
  - Maryland Route 91A (former)
- M-91 (Michigan highway)
- Minnesota State Highway 91
  - County Road 91 (St. Louis County, Minnesota)
- Missouri Route 91
- Nebraska Highway 91
  - Nebraska Link 91D
  - Nebraska Spur 91A
  - Nebraska Spur 91B
- Nevada State Route 91 (1959) (former)
- New Jersey Route 91
  - County Route 91 (Bergen County, New Jersey)
- New Mexico State Road 91
- New York State Route 91
  - County Route 91 (Herkimer County, New York)
  - County Route 91 (Monroe County, New York)
  - County Route 91 (Niagara County, New York)
  - County Route 91 (Oneida County, New York)
  - County Route 91 (Onondaga County, New York)
  - County Route 91 (Rensselaer County, New York)
  - County Route 91 (Saratoga County, New York)
  - County Route 91 (Schenectady County, New York)
  - County Route 91 (Suffolk County, New York)
  - County Route 91 (Sullivan County, New York)
- North Carolina Highway 91
- North Dakota Highway 91
- Ohio State Route 91
- Oklahoma State Highway 91
- Pennsylvania Route 91 (former)
- Rhode Island Route 91
- Tennessee State Route 91
- Texas State Highway 91
  - Texas State Highway Spur 91
  - Farm to Market Road 91
- Utah State Route 91 (1935–1969) (former)
- Virginia State Route 91
- Wisconsin Highway 91
- Wyoming Highway 91

== Vietnam ==
- National Road 91 (Vietnam)

== See also ==
- A91 road

Preceded by 90	Lists of highways 91	Succeeded by 92
